= Ian Davenport (producer) =

- Genres: Alternative rock; experimental rock; electronic
- Occupations: Engineer; producer; mixer
- Website: http://www.ian-davenport.co.uk/index.html

Ian Davenport is an English producer, engineer and mixer based at the Courtyard Studio in Oxfordshire. Davenport is notable for his work for Radiohead's Philip Selway, Supergrass, Gaz Coombes and Band Of Skulls.

== Associated awards ==
Year	Artist	Award	Title	Album
2000 (winner)	Badly Drawn Boy	Mercury Music Prize	Album of the Year	The Hour of Bewilderbeast
2015 (shortlist)	Gaz Coombes	Mercury Music Prize	Album Of The Year	Matador
2016 (shortlist)	Gaz Coombes	Ivor Novello	Album Award	Matador
2017 (winner)	July Talk	Juno Award	Alternative Album Of The Year	Touch

== Discography ==
Year	Title	Artist	Credit
1999	EP3	Badly Drawn Boy	Producer
1999	Up Here For Hours	Medal	Producer
1999	Drop Your Weapon	Medal	Producer
2000	Once Around The Block	Badly Drawn Boy	Producer
2001	Junk Shop	Ben's Symphonic Orchestra	Producer
2001	Stuntman	Medal	Producer
2001	Where Do I Begin?	Shirley Bassey	Remixer
2000	Mad Dog	Elastica	Remixer
2001	lunarTUNES	awayTEAM	Composer/Producer
2003	Kiss Kiss Bang Bang	awayTEAM	Composer/Producer
2003	Soul Sloshing	Venus Hum	Remixer
2003	Friday's Dust	Doves	Remixer
2003	You're Da 1	P-Nut	Remixer
2003	Keystroke	Her Space Holiday	Remixer
2003	Augustine	El Hula	Remixer
2003	Cowboy	Ben's Symphonic Orchestra	Remixer
2003	Wake	Dog	Remixer
2003	Men Are Not Nice Guys	Grand Popo Football Club	Remixer
2004	Dialogue	The Honeymoon	Producer
2004	Little Miss Selfish	The Bluefoot Project	Remixer
2005	Have Yourself A Merry Little Christmas	Lou Rawls	Remixer
2005	The Christmas Waltz	Nancy Wilson	Remixer
2005	The Sound Inside	Breaks Co-op	Remixer
2005	The Angela Test	Leaves	Engineer
2006	Be Your Alibi	The Race	Producer
2006	The Head Club	The Head Club	Producer
2007	True Love Will Find You In The End	Richard Walters	Producer
2008	Architect of My Love	Danny Valentine and the Meditations	Producer
2008	You Are The Family Machine	The Family Machine	Producer
2008	The Last Temptation of Chris	Chris Difford	Engineer
2008	Summer Palace	Sunny Day Sets Fire	Producer
2008	The Troubadours	The Troubadours	Producer
2008	Diamond Hoo-Ha	Supergrass	Engineer
2008	I'm Not Superstitious	The Troubadours	Producer
2008	Charmed and Strange	Yoav	Producer
2009	Run Dry	Kerry Leatham	Producer
2009	Mother World	Peter Conway	Producer
2009	Lost Art	Stricken City	Producer
2009	Baby Darling Doll Face Honey	Band Of Skulls	Producer
2010	Familial	Philip Selway	Producer
2010	Shake/Shiver/Moan	22-20s	Producer
2010	Bring Mich Nach Hause	Wir Sind Helden	Producer
2011	It's About Time	Treetop Flyers	Engineer
2011	Got It If You Want It	22-20s	Producer
2011	Running Blind	Philip Selway	Producer
2011	Bruiser	The Duke Spirit	Engineer
2011	I Dream Myself Awake	Brigitte Aphrodite	Producer
2011	England's Bleeding	Robinson	Mixer
2012	Where The Echoes Die	Too Tangled	Producer
2012	Not Like You	Bleech	Producer
2012	Regret Less	Richard Walters	Mix
2012	Take Us Alive	Other Lives	Engineer
2012	Another Still Life	Prata Vetra	Engineer/Mix
2012	Yippie Yeah	The Diamond Noise	Producer
2012	Sweet Sour	Band Of Skulls	Producer
2013	Stonefield	Stonefield	Producer
2013	Nature Nurture	Dinosaur Pile-Up	Producer
2013	Presents Gold Digger and Other HipHop Joints of Distinction	JasonRockCity	Producer
2013	Are You Ready	The Diamond Noise	Producer
2013	Humble Sky	Bleech	Producer
2014	Stay Restless	Too Tangled	Producer
2014	Ein Leichtes Schwert	Judith Holofernes	Producer
2014	Young Animal Hearts	Spring Offensive	Engineer
2014	Wardens	Wardens	Producer
2014	Who's Loving You Now	Kerri Watt	Producer
2014	Tumbler	Slightlykilld	Producer
2014	Tigers of the year	Baltimore	Producer
2015	Matador	Gaz Coombes	Co-producer/Engineer
2015	Exotic Trash	Black Fox	Producer
2015	Wonder	Bite The Buffalo	Producer
2015	The Die Has Been Cast	Brockley Forest	Producer
2015	Birds On The Roof	Head Of The Herd	Producer
2015	Houses That You Lived In	Family Machine	Producer/Mix
2015	Wish You Were Orange/Dark Around The Eyes	Orange Vision	Producer
2016	Baby Darlin' Sugar	Of Empires	Producer
2016	Touch	July Talk	Producer
2016	Hide	Rebelle	Producer
2017	Slowdive	Slowdive	Engineer
2017	Access To Infinity	Jesse Roper	Producer
2017	To the Top of the Hill and Roll...	Pet Deaths	Producer
2017	Too Tangled	Revel Revel	Producer
2017	Summer Rain	Baltimore	Producer
2018	Holy Doom	Demob Happy	Producer
2018	World's Strongest Man	Gaz Coombes	Co-Producer/ Engineer
2018	Gateways	The Vintage Caravan	Producer
2020	Frenzy	Holy Roller Baby	Producer
2021	Monuments	The Vintage Caravan	Producer
2022	Unhappy Endings	Pet Deaths	Producer
2023	Turn the Car Around	Gaz Coombes	Producer
2023	Chaos and Calypso	John J Presley	Producer
2023	Everything Is Alive	Slowdive	Engineer
2023	Carried in Sound	Smoke Fairies	Mix
2024	Smile Like Heaven	Holy Roller Baby	Producer
2024	Signals	D3LTA	Producer
2025	Minor Detail	D3LTA	Producer
2025	The Window (Part One)	Pet Deaths	Producer
2025	Little Crimes	The Incredible Flight of Birdman	Producer
2025	Rotation	Slightlykilld	Producer
2025	Hail To The Thief (Live Recordings 2003-2009)	Radiohead	Pre-Production / Candidate Selection
