= Blue Morpho (album) =

Studio album by Ed O'Brien
- Released: 22 May 2026
- Recorded: 2020–2025
- Studios: The Church Studios, London; Seven Sound, Wales
- Genre: Psychedelic folk
- Length: 38:15
- Label: Transgressive
- Producer: Paul Epworth

Ed O'Brien chronology
Earth (2020)	Blue Morpho (2026)

Singles from Blue Morpho
- 1. "Blue Morpho" Released: 17 March 2026; 2. "Incantations" Released: 22 April 2026

Blue Morpho is the second album by the English musician Ed O'Brien, released on 22 May 2026 on Transgressive Records. It was produced by Paul Epworth. O'Brien recorded Blue Morpho in Wales and London following a period of depression. It was accompanied by a short film, Blue Morpho: The Three Act Play. O'Brien began a European tour in October 2026. Blue Morpho received positive reviews.

== Recording ==
O'Brien began writing Blue Morpho after the release of his debut solo album, Earth, in 2019. The Earth tour was cut short by the COVID-19 global pandemic. O'Brien expressed regret over Earth, saying: "There's sort of half-truths in that record. I was obsessed with Brazil and Brazilian music, and I kind of forced it into a certain thing." For his second album, he attempted to "let go and just be completely open — to get out of the way and feel my way through it". He was initially insecure about his songwriting, fearing comparisons to his work with Radiohead, but became more relaxed.

During the lockdown, O'Brien suffered depression. He would lock himself away in the early hours, creating music with no goal until he began to hear the music as a whole piece. He was inspired by the Welsh countryside, the teachings of the athlete Wim Hof, his experiences using magic mushrooms, and advice given to him by the Radiohead songwriter, Thom Yorke, to catalogue and revisit song ideas.

Blue Morpho was produced by Paul Epworth. It was recorded at O'Brien's studio in Wales and Church Studios in London. It features musicians including the guitarist Dave Okumu, the percussionist Crispin "Spry" Robinson, the keyboardist Nick Ramm, and the Radiohead drummer, Philip Selway. The strings were arranged by the Estonian composer Tõnu Kõrvits and performed by the Tallinn Chamber Orchestra. O'Brien asked Kõrvits to compose the strings after meeting him at an Estonian music conference. He likened his work to the strings in Scott Walker songs.

Blue Morpho was recorded at 432 Hz rather than standard concert pitch. O'Brien believed the frequency has healing properties and could "vibrate in harmony with the cells in your body and the world around you ... In comparison, music at 440 Hz feels slightly shrill. The instruments sound and resonate better at this frequency, especially acoustic instruments like guitars. It feels deeper." He said his Radiohead bandmates had dismissed the practice as "new age", but that it was growing in popularity.

Blue Morpho was completed in early 2025. The album title refers to a species of butterfly O'Brien saw while living in Brazil in the early 2010s. After Kõrvits heard the track "Blue Morpho", he suggested O'Brien use it as the album title. O'Brien said: "I didn't think of it. It was right in front of me. Of course, it's like the caterpillar going into the cocoon, in that place of darkness, and emerges with wings."

== Release ==
O'Brien announced Blue Morpho on 17 March, 2026, alongside the release of the first single, "Blue Morpho". After releasing Earth under the name EOB, Blue Morpho is the first album released under his own name. O'Brien said that, for Earth, he had not wanted to "put himself front and centre", but that he had now "stopped hiding".

Blue Morpho is accompanied by a short film, Blue Morpho: The Three Act Play, which premiered at the American film festival South by Southwest in March. O'Brien began a European tour in October 2026, with support from Eska and Okumu.

== Reception ==
Professional ratings
Aggregate scores
Source	Rating
Metacritic	86/100
Review scores
Source	Rating
Clash	8/10
NME	4/5 stars
Pitchfork	7.7/10
PopMatters	8/10

On the review aggregator website Metacritic, Blue Morpho has a score 86 out of 100, indicating "universal acclaim". In NME, Andrew Trendell wrote that it was "the sound of healing, with Ed O'Brien out of his cocoon and in dazzling flight". In Clash, Tom Morgan wrote that "O'Brien boasts a wholly uninhibited approach to how rock and pop music is arranged, resulting in works that move and grow like the building blocks of life itself". Pitchfork called it "a much more confident, cohesive follow-up" to Earth. PopMatters wrote that O'Brien seemed comfortable and that "Blue Morpho sounds like the beginning of an impressive journey".

== Track listing ==
All tracks are written by Ed O'Brien and Paul Epworth.

No.	Title	Length
1.	"Incantations"	7:41
2.	"Blue Morpho"	6:18
3.	"Sweet Spot"	4:10
4.	"Teachers"	5:18
5.	"Solfeggio"	2:36
6.	"Thin Places"	2:19
7.	"Obrigado"	9:53
Total length:		38:15

== Personnel ==
Credits taken from Blue Morpho liner notes.

=== Musicians ===
- Ed O'Brien – guitar, vocals
- Dave Okumu – guitar and bass (on "Blue Morpho" and "Sweet Spot")
- Philip Selway – drums (on "Blue Morpho" and "Sweet Spot")
- Dan See – drums (on "Incantations", "Teachers" and "Obrigado")
- Crispin 'Spry' Robinson – percussion
- Yves Fernandez – bass
- Nick Ramm – keyboards
- Luke Mullen – additional keyboards (on "Incantations" and "Teachers")
- Shabaka Hutchings – flutes (on "Thin Places")
- Robert Stillman – saxophone (on "Teachers”)
- Eska – vocals (on "Incantations" and "Obrigado")
- Awsa Bergstrom – additional vocals (on "Teachers")
- Tallinn Chamber Orchestra – orchestra

=== Production ===
- Paul Epworth – production
- Riley MacIntyre – additional production and engineering
- Ben Baptie – mixing
- Joe LaPorta – mastering
- Tõnu Kõrvits – string arrangements
- Dave Okumu – additional arrangements

== Charts ==
Chart performance for Blue Morpho
Chart (2026)	Peak position
Belgian Albums (Ultratop Flanders)	97
Dutch Vinyl Albums (Dutch Charts)	25
Scottish Albums (Official Charts)	8
UK Albums (Official Charts)	73
UK Independent Albums (Official Charts)	5
