= Brasil (EOB song) =

Single by EOB

from the album Earth
- B-side: "Santa Teresa"
- Released: 5 December 2019
- Recorded: January 2019
- Studio: Assault & Battery (London); Plas Dinam (Powys, Wales); Courtyard (Oxfordshire)
- Genre: Alternative dance, folk rock
- Length: 8:27
- Label: Capitol
- Songwriter: Ed O'Brien
- Producer: Flood

EOB singles chronology
"Santa Teresa" (2019)	"Brasil" (2019)	"Shangri-La" (2020)

Music video
- "Brasil" on YouTube

"Brasil" is a song by the English musician Ed O'Brien, released under the name EOB. It was released on 5 December 2019 as the lead single from O'Brien's debut album, Earth.

== Background ==
O'Brien initially recorded "Brasil" in 2013 with the producer Ian Davenport. He rerecorded it several times with various producers. The final version, produced by Flood and mixed by Alan Moulder, was recorded in January 2019. It was the final track on Earth to be completed. The song features O'Brien's Radiohead bandmate Colin Greenwood on bass, and drums by Omar Hakim.

== Composition ==
Chris DeVille of Stereogum described the song as "a nine-minute shapeshifting epic" and "sweeping motorik pop-rock" with "plaintive guitar arpeggios" and "a bit closer to a conventional rock sound" than O'Brien's Radiohead bandmate Thom Yorke's 2019 solo album Anima. Ben Kaye of Consequence of Sound stated that "'Brasil' opens as a somewhat bucolic acoustic piece, with O’Brien’s mournful guitar and voice leading the way as strings slowly dance above them. The pace begins to quicken a third of the way through, however, as Hakim’s drumming and Greenwood’s bass make themselves known. From there, the song becomes a pulsing motorik driver that beats out into space."

== Personnel ==
Personnel taken from Earth liner notes.

- Ed O'Brien – vocals, guitar
- Colin Greenwood – bass
- Dave Okumu – guitar
- Omar Hakim – drums
- Flood – synth
- Adam "Cecil" Bartlett – programming
- Richie Kennedy – programming, synth

== Music video ==
The music video was written and directed by Andrew Donoho. Donoho said he and O'Brien were interested in space and abstract concepts of time, and so created "a narrative around transcending the physical barriers of our bodies and the temporal barriers of linear experience". O'Brien said: "What if an alien or higher being were to come to earth to help us achieve a greater existence, and not to destroy us? What would it look like if everyone on earth shared thoughts, experiences, and actions? ... I wanted to explore that concept visually through a variety of different character perspectives, mediums, and impressionistic visual effects."
