= Ian Davenport =

Ian Davenport may refer to:

- Ian Davenport (artist)
- Ian Davenport (producer)
- Ian Davenport (Coronation Street)
