= Earth (EOB album) =

2020 studio album by Ed O'Brien

Studio album by Ed O'Brien (as EOB)
- Released: 17 April 2020
- Recorded: 2012–2020
- Studio: Assault & Battery (London); Plas Dinam (Powys, Wales); Courtyard (Oxfordshire); Hoxa (London)
- Genre: Alternative rock; post-Britpop; dance-rock
- Length: 46:00
- Label: Capitol
- Producer: Flood, Catherine Marks

Ed O'Brien chronology
Earth (2020)	Blue Morpho (2026)

Singles from Earth
- 1. "Brasil" Released: 5 December 2019; 2. "Shangri-La" Released: 6 February 2020; 3. "Olympik" Released: 2 April 2020; 4. "Cloak of the Night" Released: 9 April 2020

Earth is the debut solo album by the English musician Ed O'Brien, released under the name EOB. It was released by Capitol Records on 17 April 2020. It was produced by Flood and Catherine Marks and features musicians including the drummer Omar Hakim, the bassist Nathan East, the Invisible member Dave Okumu, the folk singer Laura Marling, the Portishead guitarist Adrian Utley, the Wilco drummer Glenn Kotche and the Radiohead bassist Colin Greenwood.

O'Brien, a member of Radiohead, had been writing music for years, but lacked confidence and felt his songs did not fit with Radiohead. After abandoning plans to make electronic music, he made demos with the producer Ian Davenport in 2014, then recorded with Flood from late 2017 to early 2019. The music was inspired by his time living in Brazil and attending Carnival.

Earth received mostly positive reviews. O'Brien began a North American tour in February 2020; the full Earth tour was canceled due to the COVID-19 pandemic.

== Writing and recording ==
O'Brien is a guitarist in the English band Radiohead, whose primary songwriter is Thom Yorke. O'Brien had written his own music for years, especially around the time of Radiohead's 1997 album OK Computer, but had never written lyrics. He said: "I was a bit like a dog at the Battersea Dog's Home – I had no self-confidence, I was slightly beaten up." However, he said he had never felt "creatively stifled" in Radiohead. He wrote "Banksters" in 2009 in response to the 2008 financial crisis.

In 2012, O'Brien and his family moved to Brazil, living for a year on a farm near Ubatuba. O'Brien planned to create electronic music using Ableton Live, inspired by dubstep and Burial, but found it "didn't resonate with me in Brazil". Instead, he was inspired by Brazilian Carnival and "the spirit and being in Brazil ... open-heartedness, rhythm, colour". He also cited the 1991 album Screamadelica by Primal Scream as an inspiration: "I put Screamadelica on for the first time in years and I had a fucking eureka moment ... It was rave, and it was connectedness, it was hope, it was powerful." Other influences included Earth, Wind & Fire, Arcade Fire, Underworld, Bill Withers, Talking Heads and the "Celtic, folky" music of Led Zeppelin. O'Brien wanted to "make music with one foot in the world of reality, the other in the spirit world", like the magical realism of the writer Gabriel Garcia Márquez.

O'Brien suspended work when Radiohead began work on their ninth album, A Moon Shaped Pool, in mid-2014. Early in the sessions, they worked on O'Brien's songs, but found that they did not fit Radiohead. O'Brien said: "Radiohead is about the communal, but it's also about serving the songs of Thom. It's not set up to serve the songs of me. It was very obvious. I was a bit crestfallen at first, but I'm so glad. I had to make this journey without my brothers." Additionally, O'Brien felt his music had a "distinct energy" that would be lost if it became a "hybrid product". He initially worried what his bandmates would think of the album, but decided: "Fuck that, I have to just be myself ... Of course you want the approval of your bandmates but it's not the be-all and end-all. This is my own thing. It's different to Radiohead."

O'Brien initially planned to have someone else sing, and considered asking Yorke. He decided to sing after he was pleased with the demos he made with the producer Ian Davenport in 2014. He recorded with the producer Flood from late 2017 to early 2019, at Plas Dinam in the Cambrian Mountains and Flood's Assault & Battery Studios in London.

O'Brien wanted to call the album Pale Blue Dot, in reference to the 1990 photograph of Earth, but was prevented by copyright problems. He chose Earth as it was direct and he did not want anything ironic, obtuse or mysterious. He used the moniker EOB as he did not want to "put himself front and centre".

== Music ==
Earth features elements of alternative rock, post-Britpop, dance-rock, tropical dance, bossa nova, and punk funk. NME described it as "a mix of tender folk and blissed-out rave". O'Brien said Earth contained elements of rock, soul, and ambient music, but that it was lyrically "a gospel album, about having been through the dark and moving towards the light". He said he intended it to be the first album in a trilogy.

== Promotion and release ==
In late 2019, O'Brien launched social media accounts to promote the album. On 4 October, he released his debut solo work, the non-album track "Santa Teresa". Stereogum described it as a "haunting, keening" ambient instrumental in the style of Brian Eno and Fennesz.

The first single from Earth, "Brasil", was released as a limited 12" vinyl on 5 December 2019. The video, directed by Andrew Donoho, shows humanity's response to an alien force that brings about greater community and understanding. On 6 February 2020, O'Brien announced the album title, release date and track list, and released the second single, "Shangri-La". The third single, "Olympik", was released on 2 April. "Cloak of the Night", a duet with Laura Marling, was released on 9 April 2020.

O'Brien began a tour in February 2020, performing in Toronto, Chicago, New York City and Los Angeles. An intentional tour, with performances at larger venues and music festivals, was cancelled due to the COVID-19 pandemic. While promoting the album in interviews, O'Brien fell ill with a suspected COVID-19 infection.

== Critical reception ==
Professional ratings
Aggregate scores
Source	Rating
AnyDecentMusic?	6.8/10
Metacritic	70/100
Review scores
Source	Rating
AllMusic	3/5 stars
Clash	8/10
Exclaim!	8/10
musicOMH	4/5 stars
NME	4/5 stars
The Observer	2/5 stars
Pitchfork	5.7/10
Rolling Stone	3.5/5 stars

On the review aggregate website Metacritic, Earth has a score of 70 out of 100 based on 14 reviews, indicating "generally favourable reviews". The review aggregator website AnyDecentMusic? gave it 6.8 out of 10, based on their assessment of the critical consensus.

Writing for Clash, Sophie Walker gave Earth a positive review, writing that it was "a reassuring anchor in these chaotic times ... The on-edge instrumentation has distinct echoes of [O'Brien's] Radiohead days, proving that unlike many bandmates that split from their main gig, O'Brien is in no rush to shake off their signature, and instead brings it forward into his own work: always evolving, always maturing." The MusicOMH critic John Murphy wrote that Earth was "well worth the wait", and particularly praised the vocals: "O'Brien's voice is surprisingly strong and varied – on 'Shangri-La' it switches between a falsetto and his more usual lower range ... While he may not be as distinctive as Thom Yorke (and let's face it, few are), it's good to hear him take a more prominent role than his usual backing vocals."

The NME reviewer Andrew Trendell praised "Brasil", saying that it "captures the full and kaleidoscopic range of this record; it's one-part tender folk lament and one-part dancefloor banger". Trendell concluded that "O'Brien's personality shines through, and it's a pleasure to get to know him. It's tempting to conclude he's Radiohead's secret weapon." In Rolling Stone, Angie Martoccio called Earth an "exceptional solo debut"; he praised O'Brien's vocals and considered "Cloak of the Night" the album's "gut-wrenching highlight". Dylan Barnabe of Exclaim! wrote that Earth was "an impressive solo debut from O'Brien" and "one of this year's more fully formed albums", with "swaths of texture and sonic landscapes that unfold amid layered synth, soaring guitars, rattling percussion and O'Brien's unwavering vocals".

Martin Toussaint from DIY gave Earth a lukewarm review, saying it "might provide moments of hope and compassion across its runtime, but for the majority it feels too indirect and underplayed". Emily Mackay of The Observer said that "for all its ambition, [Earth] will mainly be of interest to Radiohead completists". Timothy Monger of AllMusic wrote that "Earth often recalls the late 90s, when the aftermath of Britpop and the burgeoning electronica scene collided with rave, folk, and other disparate elements ... While those layered textures, pulsing beats, and unfolding guitar loops are fine, it's EOB as a reflective acoustic singer/songwriter that provides Earth's most authentic moments." In June, Rolling Stone named Earth among the best albums of 2020 so far, writing: "Never has [O'Brien's] voice sounded so prominent — so recognisable — until now." In 2026, O'Brien said Earth "didn't do much for me ... There's sort of half-truths in that record. I was obsessed with Brazil and Brazilian music, and I kind of forced it into a certain thing."

== Track listing ==
All tracks are written by Ed O'Brien.

Earth track listing
No.	Title	Length
1.	"Shangri-La"	5:47
2.	"Brasil"	8:27
3.	"Deep Days"	5:00
4.	"Long Time Coming"	2:50
5.	"Mass"	4:10
6.	"Banksters"	5:08
7.	"Sail On"	3:27
8.	"Olympik"	8:38
9.	"Cloak of the Night"	2:33
Total length:		46:00

== Personnel ==
Musicians

- Ed O'Brien – vocals, guitar (all tracks); bass guitar (tracks 1, 3, 6, 8); loops (track 1); programming (tracks 3, 6); percussion (tracks 4, 8); keyboards (track 8)
- Flood – synthesiser (tracks 1, 2, 5–7); guitar (track 3); programming (track 8)
- Richie Kennedy – percussion (track 1, 6–8); programming (tracks 1–3, 5, 7, 8); synthesiser (track 2, 5); drums (track 3)
- Adrian Utley – guitar (tracks 1, 7)
- Colin Greenwood – bass (track 2)
- David Okumu – guitar (tracks 2, 4, 8)
- Omar Hakim – drums (tracks 2, 8)
- Adam "Cecil" Bartlett – programming (tracks 2, 3, 5–7)
- Nathan East – bass (tracks 4, 8)
- Laura Marling – vocals (tracks 5, 9)
- Glenn Kotche – drums, percussion (track 5)
- Catherine Marks – programming (track 8)

Technical personnel

- Flood – production (all tracks)
- Catherine Marks – production (track 8), additional production (tracks 1, 4, 5)
- Adam "Cecil" Bartlett – engineering
- Richie Kennedy – additional engineering
- Ian Davenport – additional engineering
- Alan Moulder – mixing
- Caesar Edmunds – mix engineer
- Andreas Brooks - cover art, design

== Charts ==
Chart performance for Earth
Chart (2020)	Peak position
German Albums (Offizielle Top 100)	94
UK Albums (Official Charts)	13
