= Colin Greenwood =

English bassist (born 1969)

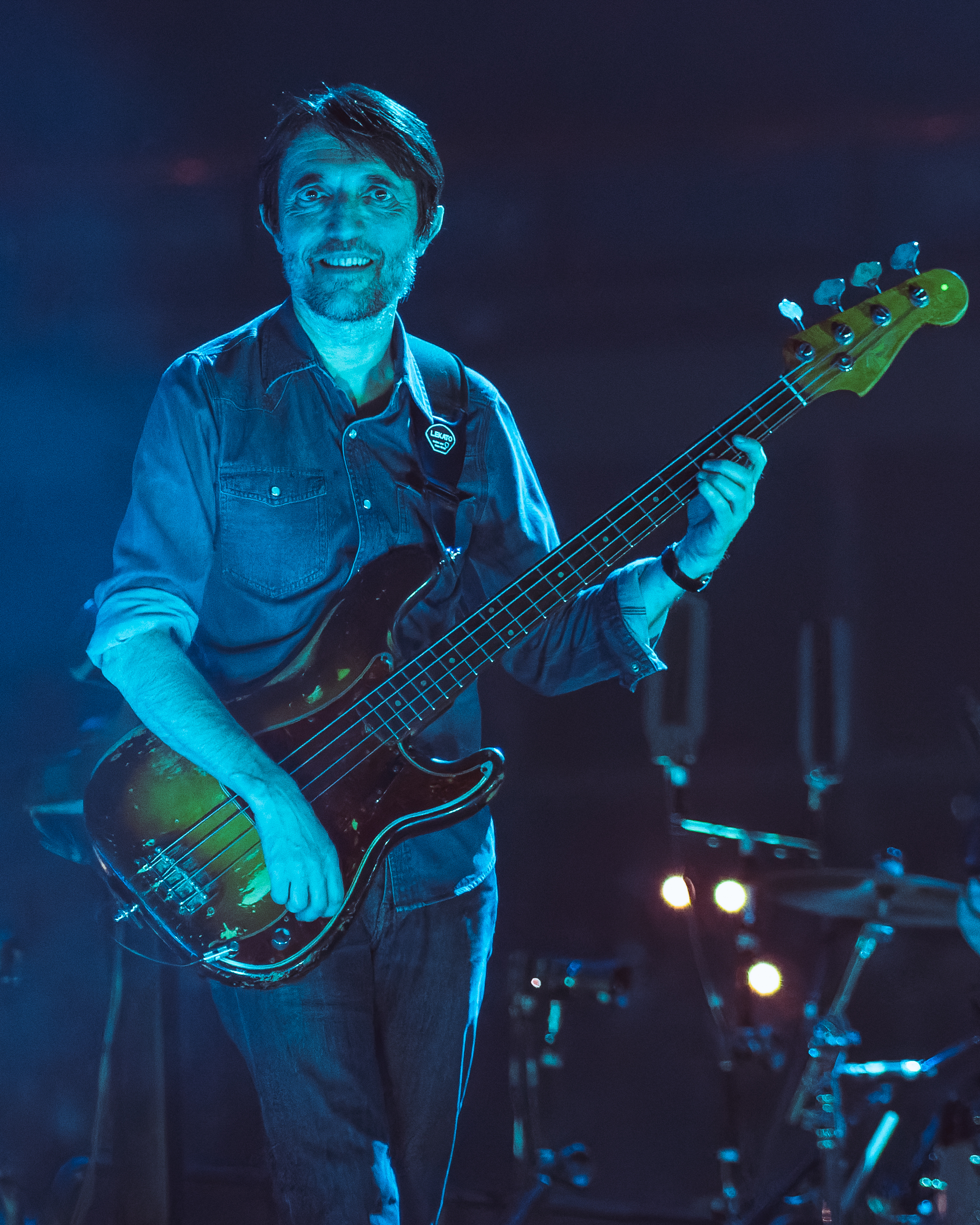
- Greenwood performing with Radiohead in 2025

Background information
- Born: Colin Charles Greenwood; 26 June 1969 (age 57); Oxford, England
- Education: Peterhouse, Cambridge (BA)
- Genres: Alternative rock; art rock; electronic; film score
- Occupations: Musician; songwriter; composer
- Instruments: Bass; keyboards; synthesisers
- Years active: 1985–present
- Member of: Radiohead

Colin Charles Greenwood (born 26 June 1969) is an English bassist and a member of the rock band Radiohead. Along with bass guitar, Greenwood plays upright bass and electronic instruments.

With his younger brother, the guitarist Jonny Greenwood, Colin attended Abingdon School in Abingdon, England, where they formed Radiohead. Radiohead have achieved acclaim and have sold more than 30 million albums. Greenwood was inducted into the Rock and Roll Hall of Fame as a member of Radiohead in 2019.

Greenwood has contributed to solo projects by the other members of Radiohead, and has collaborated with musicians including Tamino, Gaz Coombes, Nick Cave and Warren Ellis. In 2024, he published a book of his photographs of Radiohead.

== Early life ==
Colin Greenwood is the older brother of the Radiohead guitarist Jonny Greenwood. Their father served in the British Army as a bomb disposal expert. The Greenwood family has historical ties to the British Communist Party and the socialist Fabian Society. Greenwood and his family lived in Germany during his youth.

As a teenager, Greenwood read historical works such as The Communist Manifesto and Ragged-Trousered Philanthropists and fiction by American writers including Richard Ford and John Cheever. He enjoyed films by Jean-Luc Godard, Derek Jarman and Michelangelo Antonioni. He credited his older sister, Susan, with introducing him and Jonny to "miserable" bands such as the Fall, Magazine and Joy Division. He said: "We were ostracised at school because everyone else was into Iron Maiden."

Greenwood and his brother attended Abingdon School, a private school for boys in Oxfordshire. When he was 12, he met the future Radiohead singer, Thom Yorke. Their future bandmates Ed O'Brien, whom Greenwood met during a school production of the opera Trial by Jury, and Philip Selway were also pupils. Greenwood bought his first guitar when he was 15. He and Yorke had classical guitar lessons with the Abingdon music teacher, Terence Gilmore-James, who introduced them to jazz, film scores, postwar avant-garde music, and 20th-century classical music.

Greenwood said he began playing bass out of necessity, as O'Brien already played guitar. He taught himself by playing along to New Order, Joy Division and Otis Redding. He said the band members picked their instruments "because we wanted to play music together, rather than just because we wanted to play that particular instrument. So it was more of a collective angle, and if you could contribute by having someone else play your instrument, then that was really cool."

Greenwood read English at Peterhouse, Cambridge, between 1987 and 1990, and read modern American literature including Cheever, Raymond Carver and other postwar American writers. While at Peterhouse, he worked as an events and entertainments officer. After graduating, he took a job as a sales assistant at the record shop Our Price in Oxford.

== Radiohead ==
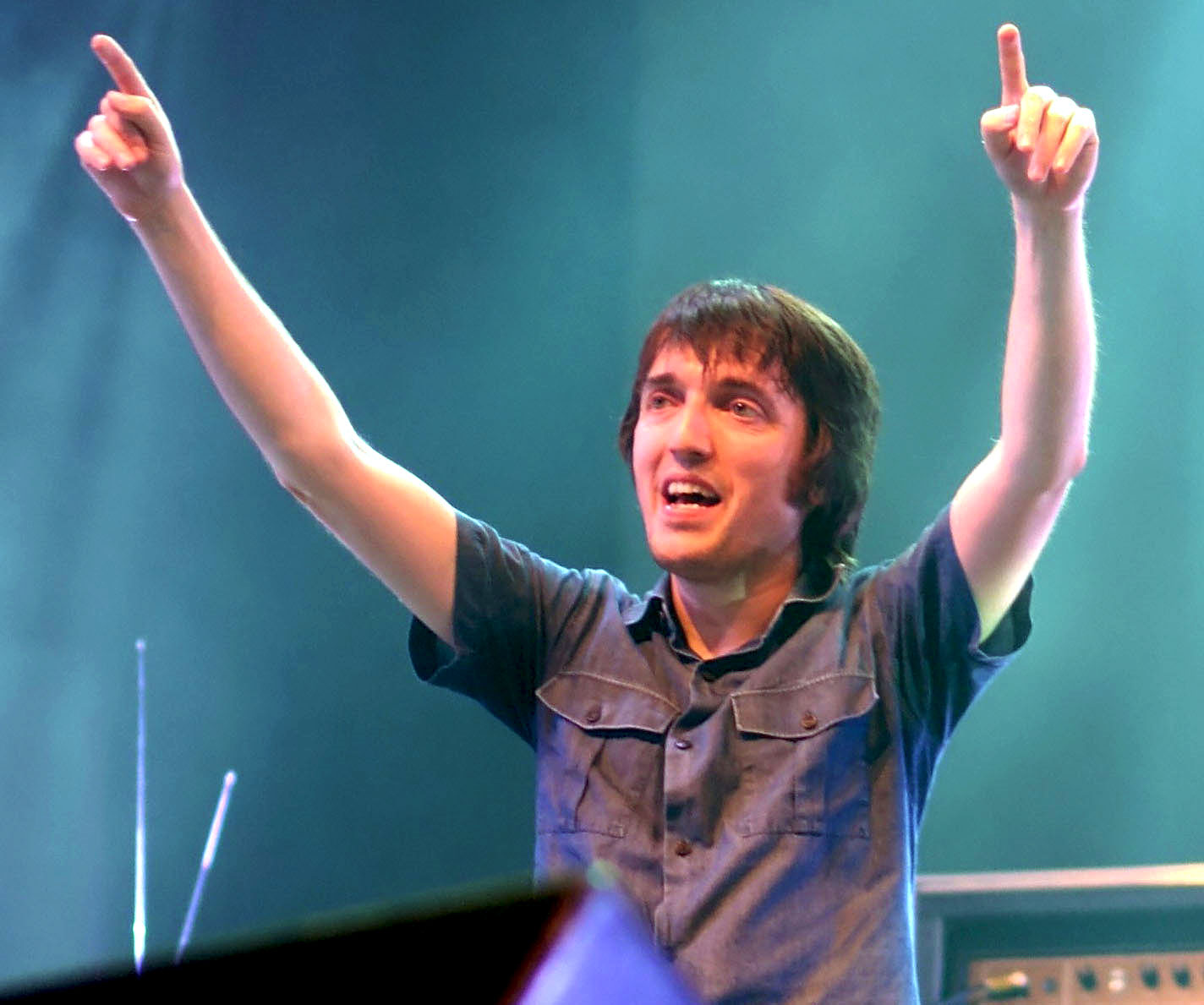
Greenwood at Bonnaroo, 2006

In late 1991, the EMI sales representative Keith Wozencroft visited Our Price and struck up conversation with Greenwood. When Wozencroft mentioned that he was moving to a position as an A&R scout at the EMI subsidiary Parlophone, Greenwood gave him a copy of On a Friday's latest demo.

Colin Greenwood, Jonny Greenwood, Ed O'Brien and Phil Selway discussing OK Computer in 1997

On a Friday signed a six-album recording contract with EMI and changed their name to Radiohead. By 2011, Radiohead had sold more than 30 million albums worldwide. They were inducted into the Rock and Roll Hall of Fame in March 2019. On being in a band with his brother, Jonny, Colin said: "Beyond the normal brotherly thing, I respect him as a person and a musician."

Greenwood mostly plays fingerstyle, and said he was unskilled with plectrums. He mainly uses Fender basses and Ampeg and Ashdown amplifiers. He also plays double bass on tracks such as "Pyramid Song" and "You and Whose Army". While his main role is bass, Greenwood said each Radiohead member contributed to song development. He said he did not think of himself as a bass player and was "just in a band with other people". Among his influences are Booker T and the MGs, Bill Withers, Curtis Mayfield, Peter Hook and J Dilla.

In 2008, Mojo wrote that Greenwood and Selway were "surely the most inventive rhythm section working close to the rock mainstream". In 2014, NME readers voted Greenwood one of the 40 best bassists of all time.

== Other work ==
In 1997, Greenwood participated in a campaign to encourage students from state schools to apply for his alma mater, Cambridge University. In 2004, Greenwood participated on a panel in the annual sixth-form conference run by Radley College in collaboration with School of St Helen and St Katharine, speaking about digital rights management.

Greenwood contributed bass to two soundtracks by his brother Jonny, Bodysong (2003) and Inherent Vice, and to the soundtrack for the 2008 film Woodpecker. He played bass on the albums Amir (2018) and Sahar (2022) by the Belgian-Egyptian singer Tamino, the album World's Strongest Man (2018) by Gaz Coombes, and on "Brasil" from Earth (2020), the debut solo album by the Radiohead guitarist Ed O'Brien. He contributed beat programming to Yorke's song "Hearing Damage" from the soundtrack to The Twilight Saga: New Moon, and on "Guess Again!" from Yorke's album Tomorrow's Modern Boxes (2014). In 2013, he soundtracked a Dries van Noten runway show, performing solo bass guitar. In 2018, he reviewed Michael Palin's book Erebus: The Story of a Ship for the Spectator.

In late 2022, Greenwood toured Australia as part of Nick Cave and Warren Ellis's band. He appeared on their 2023 live album Australian Carnage. Greenwood joined Cave's North American tour in September 2023, and contributed bass to the 2024 album Wild God by Nick Cave and the Bad Seeds. He joined Cave and the Bad Seeds on their 2024 tour after their bassist, Martyn P. Casey, fell ill. That October, Greenwood published a book, How to Disappear: A Portrait of Radiohead, comprising his photographs of Radiohead taken between 2003 and 2016. On March 18, 2026, Greenwood performed as part of the house band at the Barbican Centre, London, for the release of the Marianne Faithfull documentary Broken English.

== Personal life ==
In December 1998, Greenwood married Molly McGrann, an American literary critic and novelist. They have three sons and live in Oxford. Greenwood enjoys writers such as Thomas Pynchon, V.S. Naipaul and Delmore Schwartz. In 2003, he discussed his favourite photographs in the Victoria and Albert Museum, choosing images by photographers including Frederick Sommer and Harold Edgerton. In 2014, Greenwood completed a triathlon to raise funds for cancer research.

== See also ==
- List of Old Abingdonians
