= Live in Japan (22-20s album) =

Live album by 22-20s
- Released: 30 March 2005
- Recorded: 30 November 2004
- Genre: Rock, blues
- Length: 51:00
- Label: Heavenly Records (UK); Astralwerks (U.S.)
- Producer: Mitsutoshi Kunisue; Mariko Miyashita; Takeshi Nagano; Yoshiharu Moriyama; Hiroki Soshi

22-20s chronology
22-20s (2004)	Live in Japan (2005)	Shake/Shiver/Moan (2010)

Live in Japan is a live album by English rock and blues band 22-20s, released exclusively to Japan.

The album was recorded on 30 November 2004 at Shibuya Club Quattro, Tokyo and released on 30 March 2005.

== Track listing ==
1. "Why Don’t You Do It for Me" – 3:29
2. "Got Messed Up" – 2:55
3. "Such a Fool" – 3:49
4. "I’m the One" – 2:47
5. "Hold On" – 5:02
6. "Shoot Your Gun" – 4:29
7. "Baby Brings Bad News" – 3:41
8. "Friends" – 3:56
9. "Baby You’re Not in Love" – 3:30
10. "Weight Off Me" – 2:18
11. "22 Days" – 2:59
12. "Cut You Down" – 2:11
13. "Devil in Me" – 4:44
14. "King Bee" – 5:19
