= 22-20s (album) =

Studio album by 22-20s
- Released: 20 September 2004
- Studio: Sawmills Studio, Lynchmob Studios, Courtyard Studios
- Genre: Blues rock
- Length: 42:22
- Label: Heavenly Records, EMI
- Producer: Brendan Lynch

22-20s chronology
05/03 (2003)	22-20s (2004)	Live in Japan (2005)

Singles from 22-20s
- 1. "Such a Fool / Baby, You're Not in Love" Released: 2003; 2. "Why Don't You Do It for Me?" Released: 2004; 3. "Shoot Your Gun" Released: 2004; 4. "22 Days" Released: 2004; 5. "Such a Fool" Released: 2005 (re-issue)

Professional ratings
Aggregate scores
Source	Rating
Metacritic	61/100
Review scores
Source	Rating
AllMusic	3/5 stars
NME	8/10 stars
PopMatters	6/10 stars
Pitchfork Media	(6.6/10)

22-20s is the debut self-titled album by the English rock band 22-20s, released 20 September 2004.

== Track listing ==
- All songs written by Martin Trimble, except where noted.
1. "Devil in Me" 4:16
2. "Such a Fool" 3:56
3. "Baby Brings Bad News" (Charly Coombes) 3:48
4. "22 Days" 2:58
5. "Friends" 4:00
6. "Why Don't You Do It for Me?" 3:38
7. "Shoot Your Gun" 4:46
8. "The Things That Lovers Do" 4:05
9. "I'm the One" 2:57
10. "Hold On" 5:18

=== Bonus track ===
- "Baby, You're Not in Love" 3:27 (Japan and U.S. versions only)

== Personnel ==
- Martin Trimble: Guitars, Vocals
- Charly Coombes: Keyboards, Vocals
- Glen Bartup: Bass
- James Irving: Drums, Percussion

== Release ==
The album has been released in various countries.

Country	Date	Label	Format	Catalog
Japan	August 25, 2004	Toshiba-EMI	CD	TOCP 66307
United Kingdom	September 20, 2004	Heavenly	LP	HVNLP51
			CD	HVNLP51CD
United States	April 19, 2005	Astralwerks	LP	ASW 73570
			CD	ASW 60934
