= Be Your Alibi =

Studio album by The Race
- Released: 2006
- Recorded: Courtyard Studios, Oxfordshire
- Genre: Indie rock, alternative rock
- Label: Shifty Disco
- Producer: Ian Davenport, Graeme Moorcroft

The Race chronology
Be Your Alibi (2006)	In My Head It Works (2009)

Professional ratings
Review scores
Source	Rating
Music OMH	link
The Ampwire	link
Tomatrax	link

Be Your Alibi is the debut studio album by indie rock band The Race.

== Track listing ==
1. Find Out
2. Go Figure
3. Comfort, Comfort
4. When It Falls
5. Tom Song
6. Research
7. Raising Children
8. So Young And Beautiful
9. Smile
10. Amersham Road
11. Hope Song
12. They're Not Always Right (hidden track)
