= Turn the Car Around =

Studio album by Gaz Coombes
- Released: 13 January 2023
- Studio: The Cabin, Oxfordshire, Courtyard Studio, Sutton Courtenay, Oxfordshire, United Kingdom
- Length: 37:57
- Label: Hot Fruit; Virgin
- Producer: Gaz Coombes; Ian Davenport

Gaz Coombes chronology
World's Strongest Man (2018)	Turn the Car Around (2023)

Turn the Car Around is the fourth studio album by English singer-songwriter Gaz Coombes, released through Hot Fruit Recordings and Virgin Music on 13 January, 2023.

== Reception ==
According to the review aggregator Metacritic, Turn the Car Around received "universal acclaim" based on a weighted average score of 86 out of 100 from 10 critic scores. Editors at AllMusic rated this album 4 out of 5 stars, with critic Stephen Thomas Erlewine writing that this album "carries a sense of adventure that World's Strongest Man lacked, which ultimately makes it a richer listen". Emma Harrison of Clash Music rated this release an 8 out of 10, writing that "each track is a triumph and have been impeccably produced with impressively executed melodic layering that feel almost cinematically textured". The Daily Telegraph editors picked this among the best albums of the week, with critic Andrew Perry giving it 4 out of 5 stars for being "another hugely satisfying listen". Writing for musicOMH, Ben Hogwood rated Turn the Car Around 4.5 out of 5 stars, summing up that it "has enough musical substance to leave its vapour trails hanging in the sky for hours afterwards" and "is the finest achievement of Coombes’ solo career so far, a magnificent record – and the feeling still persists that there is more to come". Damien Morris of The Observer gave this album 5 out of 5 stars, calling it "the strongest suite of music Coombes has assembled in 20 years" and that it has "gorgeous, heartfelt pieces". In Record Collector, the release got 4 out of 5 stars for being "a thoughtful, and thought-provoking, set of songs from a writer whose responses to the world around him illustrate an ever-deepening maturity".

Mojo ranked this the 38th best album of 2023. musicOMH rated it the 11th best of 2023. musicOMH's round-up of the year's best albums rated this number 11.

== Track listing ==
1. "Overnight Trains" – 3:45
2. "Don't Say It's Over" – 3:47
3. "Feel Loop (Lizard Dream)" – 3:35
4. "Long Live the Strange" – 4:24
5. "Not the Only Things" – 5:37
6. "Turn the Car Around" – 3:47
7. "This Love" – 3:46
8. "Sonny the Strong" – 4:11
9. "Dance On" – 5:05

== Personnel ==
- Gaz Coombes – drums, percussion, guitar, bass guitar, piano, synthesizer, vocals, mixing, production
- Amy Ashworth – backing vocals
- Emma Brammer – backing vocals
- Tom Cockram – photography
- Loz Colbert – drums
- Matt Colton – mastering at Metropolis Mastering
- Ian Davenport – production
- Nick Fowler – bass guitar, guitar
- Piney Gir – backing vocals
- Tomas Greenhalf – saxophone
- Willie J. Healey – backing vocals
- Mike Monaghan – congas, percussion
- Garo Nahoulakian – bass guitar, guitar, piano, percussion, piano arrangement on "Don't Say It's Over", "Long Live the Strange", and "This Love"
- Steve Stacey – design

== Chart performance ==
The album charted at #6 on the UK Albums Chart. This was Coombes' first Top 10 album.

== See also ==
- 2023 in British music
- List of 2023 albums
