= The Jubilees =

English band

- Also known as: The Joobs
- Origin: Sleaford, Lincolnshire, England
- Genres: Indie
- Years active: 2004–2008
- Members: Dan Hare; Gaz Sutton; Chris Tuck; Mark Ward

The Jubilees were an English four-piece band from Sleaford, Lincolnshire, England.

== The band ==
The band formed in January 2004 in the Lincolnshire market town of Sleaford, named after the Jubilee Rooms which was one of the rooms in their local village hall.

The band comprised four members, Dan Hare (lead vocals and guitar), Mark Ward (keyboards and backing vocals), Gaz Sutton (bass) and Chris Tuck (drums).

The band first released a self-titled six track demo CD in 2005 which was written, recorded, mixed and produced by the band. They released an album Hide & Seek in October 2006, composed of eleven tracks, including "Hide & Seek", "Insomniac" and "One in a Million".

The band gigged all over the country and got through to the finals of the 2007 Road To V competition, for which previous winners have included Bombay Bicycle Club and The Young Knives.

Dan Hare went on to join the re-formed 22-20s in 2008 as second guitarist and backing vocalist.

== Discography ==
- The Jubilees (demo EP)
- Hide & Seek (album)
