= Ed O'Brien =

English musician (born 1968)

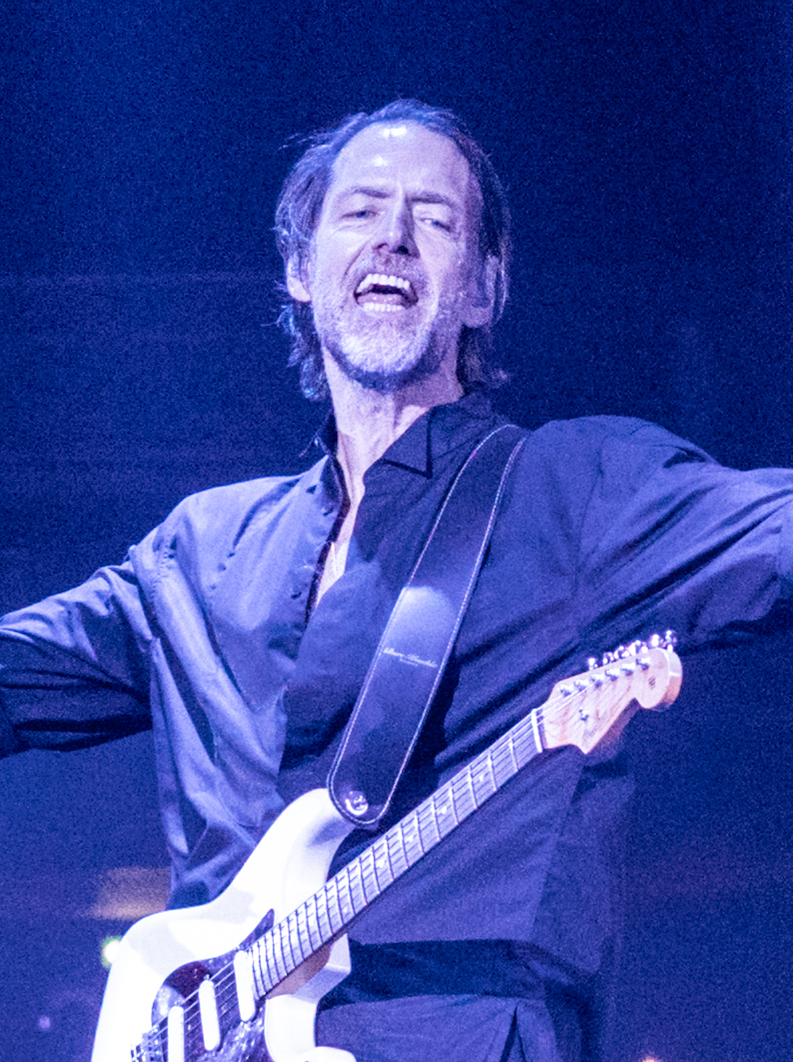
- O'Brien with Radiohead in 2025

Background information
- Also known as: EOB
- Born: Edward John O'Brien; 15 April 1968 (age 58); Oxford, England
- Genres: Alternative rock, experimental rock, electronic
- Occupations: Musician; songwriter
- Instruments: Guitar; vocals
- Years active: 1985–present
- Labels: XL; TBD; Capitol; Transgressive
- Member of: Radiohead
- Formerly of: 7 Worlds Collide

Edward John O'Brien (born 15 April 1968) is an English guitarist, songwriter, and co-founder of the rock band Radiohead. O'Brien attended Abingdon School in Oxfordshire, England, where he formed Radiohead with schoolmates. He said his role was to "service the songs" and support the songwriter, Thom Yorke. He creates ambient sounds and textures using effects, sustain units and the EBow, and provides backing vocals.

In the 2000s, with musicians including the Radiohead drummer, Philip Selway, O'Brien toured and recorded with the 7 Worlds Collide project. In 2020, he released his first solo album, Earth, under the name EOB. It was inspired by his time living in Brazil and attending Carnival. A solo tour was cut short due to the COVID-19 pandemic. His second album, Blue Morpho, was released in May 2026. O'Brien has campaigned on topics including climate change and artist rights.

Rolling Stone named O'Brien among the greatest guitarists of all time in 2010 and 2023. He was inducted into the Rock and Roll Hall of Fame as a member of Radiohead in 2019.

== Early life ==
O'Brien was born on 15 April 1968. His family comes from Ballyporeen, Ireland. One of his grandmothers was American and he has family in Texas. As a child, O'Brien enjoyed cricket and theatre. His parents separated when he was 10; O'Brien said this was when music became his "refuge". He grew up listening to post-punk acts such as Siouxsie and the Banshees, Adam and the Ants, Depeche Mode, the Police and David Bowie. He said: "It was a very foetal [time] for music because people who went to art college or artists, or musicians, suddenly thought, 'Oh, I can be that.'" As a child, O'Brien played violin and sang in a choir.

The members of Radiohead met while attending Abingdon School, a private school for boys in Abingdon, Oxfordshire. While O'Brien was playing Lysander in a school production of A Midsummer Night's Dream, he met Thom Yorke, who was scoring the production. Yorke asked him to join him for a jam. According to O'Brien, "Before that, [life] was a bit confusing, a bit crap. And then suddenly ... I felt something very strong, almost like some kind of epiphany, almost like: 'This is it.'"

O'Brien was one school year below the drummer, Philip Selway, the year above Yorke and the bassist, Colin Greenwood, and four years above Colin's brother, the guitarist Jonny Greenwood. In 1985, they formed a band, On a Friday, the name referring to their usual rehearsal day in the school's music room. They continued to rehearse during holidays while the members attended university. O'Brien studied economics at the University of Manchester, where he took part in the Second Summer of Love.

== Career ==
=== 1991–1999: Early success with Radiohead ===
In 1991, On a Friday signed a record contract with EMI and changed their name to Radiohead. They found early success with their debut single, "Creep", from their debut album, Pablo Honey (1993). For their second album, The Bends (1995), the guitarists' roles were more divided, with Yorke generally playing rhythm, Greenwood lead and Ed O'Brien providing effects. The Bends received positive reviews and elevated Radiohead's profile.

Colin Greenwood, Jonny Greenwood, Ed O'Brien, and Philip Selway discussing OK Computer in 1997

Radiohead's third album, OK Computer (1997), brought them international fame and is often acclaimed as one of the best albums of all time. O'Brien used less distortion and more delay and other effects, creating a sound that was "more about textures". He became depressed during the extensive OK Computer tour, but focused on supporting Yorke. After the tour, he returned to Oxford, used large amounts of drugs and fell further into depression. He said: "I was single, on my own … I was the lowest I've ever been. It was the irony as well – you're at the top, that old cliché." In 1999, O'Brien contributed to the soundtrack for the BBC drama series Eureka Street.

=== 2000–2007: Developing sound and 7 Worlds Collide ===
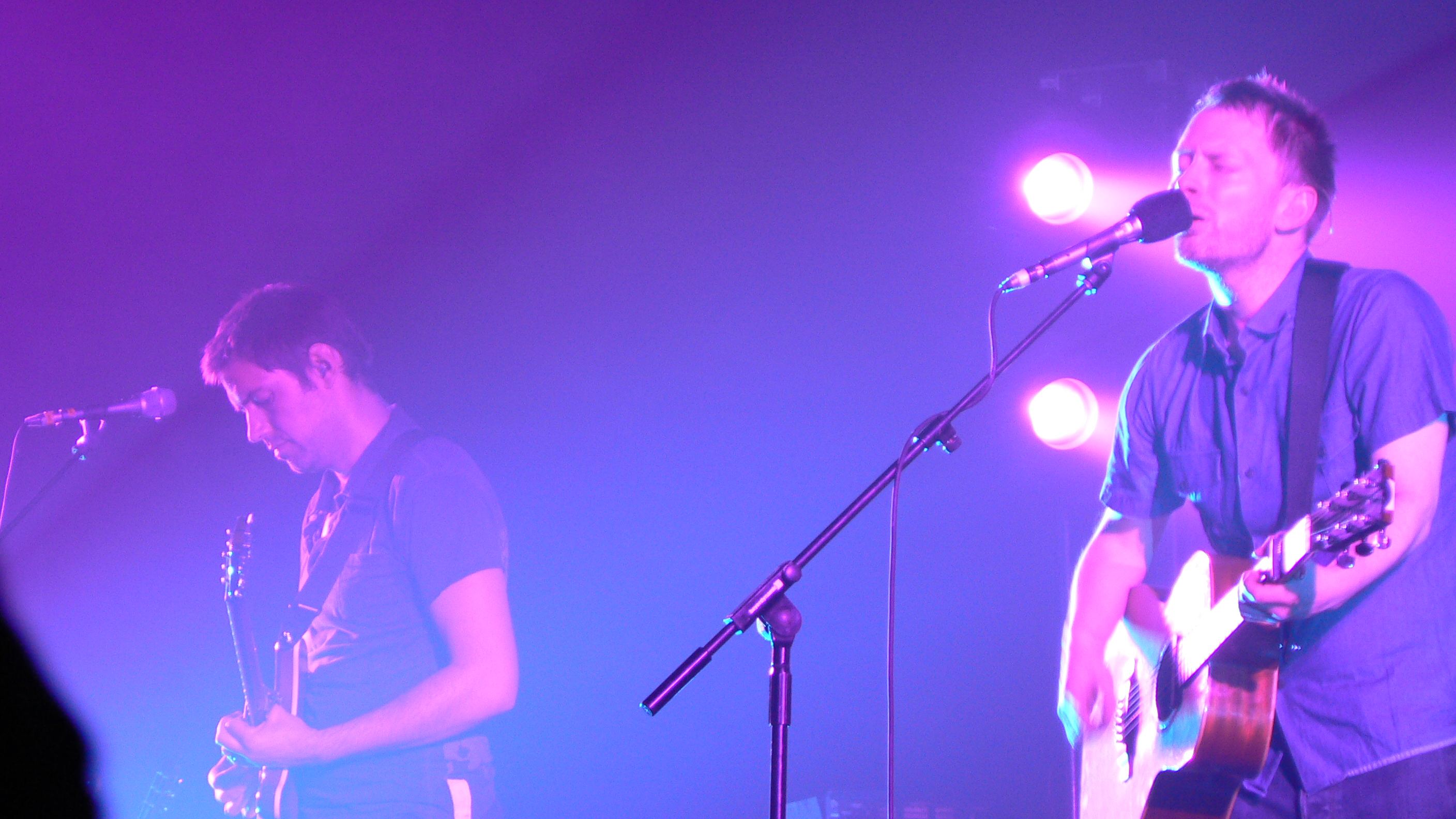
O'Brien (left) with Radiohead in Amsterdam, May 2006

Radiohead's next albums, Kid A (2000) and Amnesiac (2001), marked a dramatic change in sound, incorporating influences from electronic music, classical music, jazz and krautrock. O'Brien initially struggled with the change, saying: "It's scary – everyone feels insecure. I'm a guitarist and suddenly it's like, well, there are no guitars on this track, or no drums." He began using effects units more extensively to process his guitar, creating synthesiser-like sounds. O'Brien kept an online diary of Radiohead's progress.

With Selway and other musicians, O'Brien toured and recorded with Neil Finn as part of the 7 Worlds Collide project, providing guitar and backing vocals. He appeared in a 2011 episode of the BBC Radio 5 Live sports programme Fighting Talk in support of Record Shop Day. He contributed guitar to the 2003 Asian Dub Foundation album Enemy of the Enemy.

During the sessions for Radiohead's seventh album, In Rainbows (2007), O'Brien believed Radiohead might never record another album. He said later: "One of my mantras throughout the recording was, 'This is the last time I'm doing this. I'll never summon up the energy to do this again. So I'm going to put everything I can into it.'" He was motivated by a desire to secure Radiohead's legacy as a great band, and said in 2008: "In my view, we've made three really great records, The Bends, OK Computer and Kid A. What we needed was another great record just to seal it."

=== 2009–2018: A Moon Shaped Pool and other projects ===
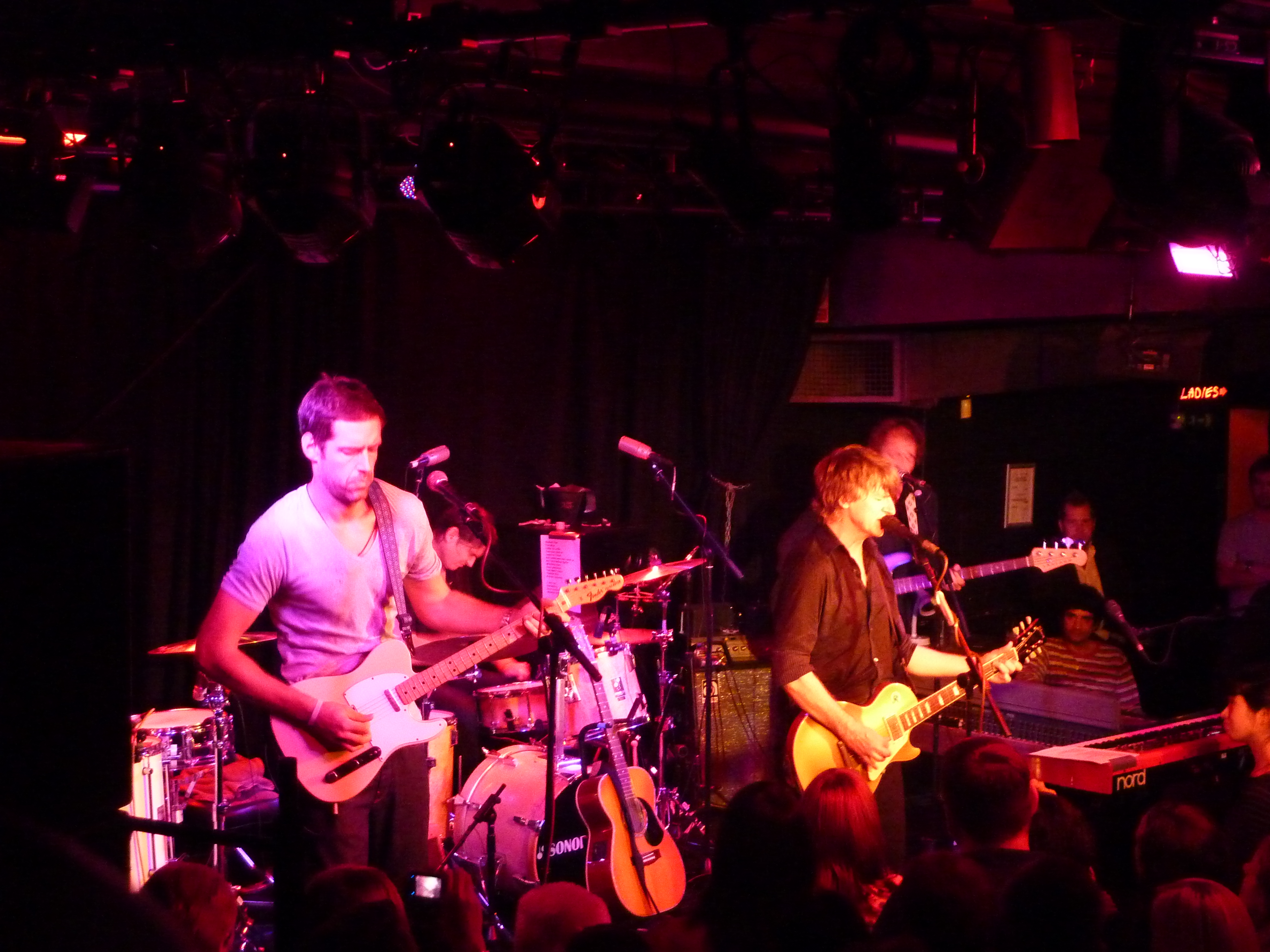
O'Brien with 7 Worlds Collide, 2009

O'Brien contributed to the 2009 album The Sun Came Out by 7 Worlds Collide. In 2013, he cofounded the Laundry, a workspace, restaurant and nightclub converted from a laundry in London Fields. In 2019, Hackney Council announced that the building would be demolished to make way for luxury flats.

In 2012 and 2013, O'Brien and his family lived on a farm near Ubatuba, where he began working on solo music. He was inspired by "the spirit and being in Brazil ... open-heartedness, rhythm, colour". He was hesitant to join the tour for Radiohead's ninth album, A Moon Shaped Pool (2016), saying he no longer "resonated" with Radiohead, but was glad to have seen it through. Following the tour, Radiohead went on hiatus. In 2018, O'Brien became an "informal patron" for the environmental pressure group Extinction Rebellion, which he described as "incredibly enlightened".

=== 2019–2021: Earth ===
Radiohead were inducted into the Rock and Roll Hall of Fame in March 2019. O'Brien and Selway attended the induction ceremony and gave speeches. O'Brien thanked his bandmates for their musicianship and friendship, saying that "some of the nights we have in the rehearsal studio [are] like transcendental moments".

O'Brien released his first solo music under the name EOB. His solo debut, the non-album track "Santa Teresa", was released on 4 October, 2019. Stereogum described it as a "haunting" ambient instrumental in the style of Brian Eno and Fennesz. O'Brien released his debut solo album, Earth, on 17 April 2020 on Capitol Records to positive reviews. It features the Radiohead bassist, Colin Greenwood, plus the drummer Omar Hakim, the Invisible members Nathan East and Dave Okumu, the folk singer Laura Marling, the Portishead guitarist Adrian Utley and the Wilco drummer Glenn Kotche. The first track, "Brasil", was released on 5 December 2019, followed by "Shangri-La" on 6 February.

Earth was inspired by O'Brien's time living in Brazil and attending Carnival, which he described as a "musical eureka moment". He had written songs for years, but lacked the confidence to bring them to Radiohead and felt they had a "distinct energy" that would be lost if they became a "hybrid product". He denied that he had ever felt "creatively stifled" in Radiohead. He said he intended Earth to be the first album in a trilogy.

O'Brien began a North American tour in February 2020. A larger tour was cancelled due to the COVID-19 pandemic. O'Brien later expressed regret over Earth, saying: "There's sort of half-truths in that record ... I kind of forced it into a certain thing." In 2020, he contributed to Ear Opener, an online video course aimed at helping young people write music. That November, he gave evidence to a DCMS Committee inquiry into the impact of streaming on the music industry. He said he wanted to speak for less successful artists, who he felt were exploited. O'Brien contributed a remix of Paul McCartney's song "Slidin'" to the 2021 remix album McCartney III Imagined.

=== 2022–present: Blue Morpho and Radiohead reunion ===
During Radiohead's hiatus, O'Brien became depressed and felt he was finished with Radiohead. He took solace in making music alone, going for long walks near his home in Wales, and using magic mushrooms with friends in Dartmoor. In preparation for Radiohead's 2025 tour, their first in seven years, he said he realised how much he loved his bandmates: "I have gone from thinking I can't see myself doing it again to realising that, you know, we do have some stellar songs."

O'Brien's second solo album, Blue Morpho, was released on 22 May 2026. It was produced by Paul Epworth and features musicians including Selway, Dave Okumu, Shabaka Hutchings and Tõnu Kõrvits. It is O'Brien's first release under his own name rather than the moniker EOB. O'Brien said that, for Earth, he had not wanted to "put himself front and centre", but was now more confident. He said he had overcome his songwriting insecurities and was now more relaxed. O'Brien began a European tour in October 2026, with support from Eska and Okumu.

== Musicianship ==
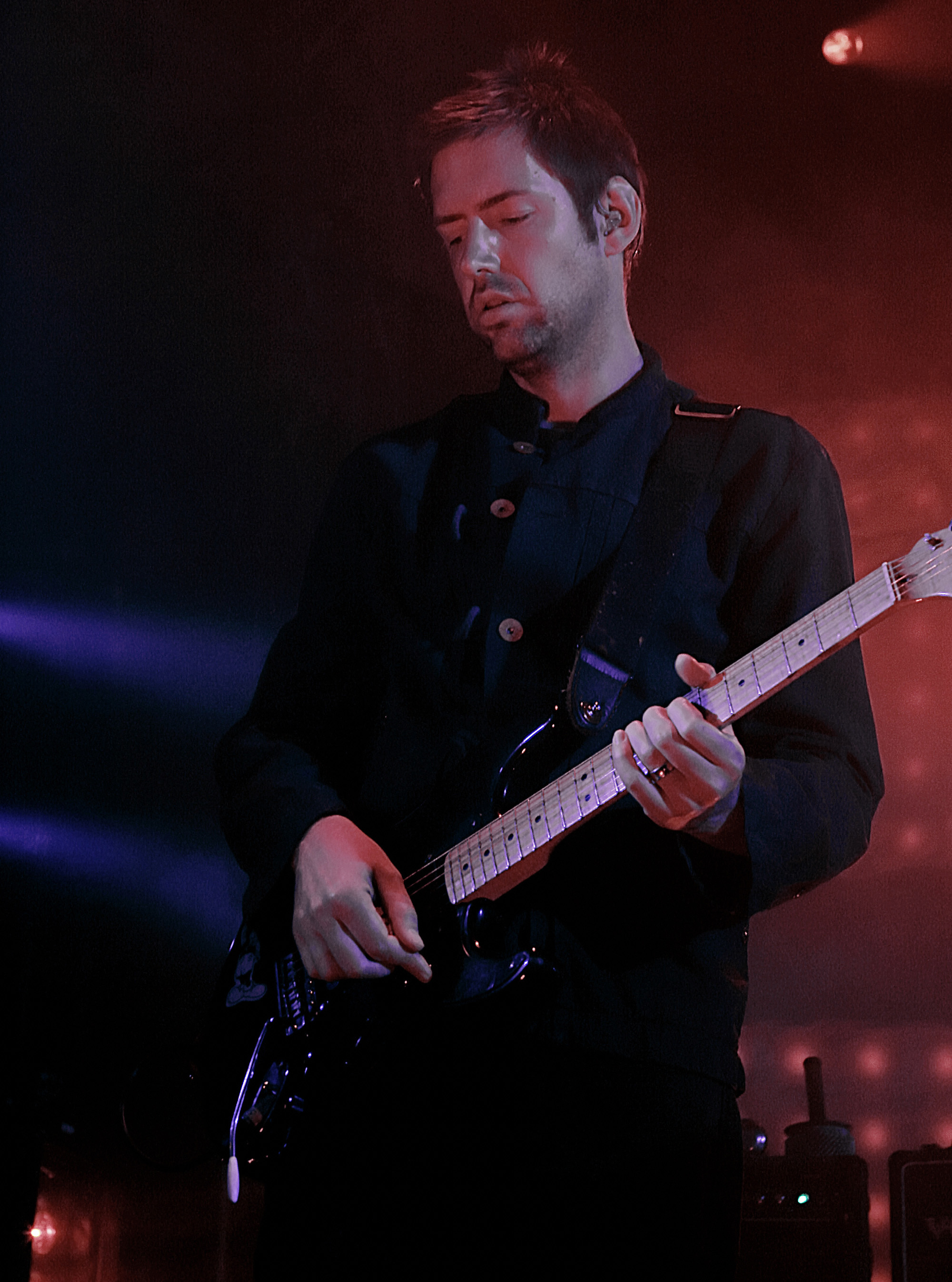
O'Brien with Radiohead in 2006

O'Brien said of his playing: "I literally learned to play my instrument within the band, so I started off very limited — and I'm still very limited. But I've been lucky, because I've been in a band that has not required you to be a virtuoso." While Jonny Greenwood plays most of Radiohead's lead guitar parts, O'Brien often creates ambient effects, making extensive use of effects units. He said of the technique: "It's a bit like you're creating a canvas. That would be in accompaniment with Thom playing chords on the piano — you're building up a cloud of effects behind."

In 2010, the Rolling Stone journalist David Fricke named O'Brien the 59th-greatest guitarist of all time. In 2023, Rolling Stone named O'Brien and Greenwood the joint 43rd-greatest guitarists, writing that O'Brien was "possibly the most underrated guitarist in rock ... adding subtle textures that enhance each song and keeping the band grounded with his cheerful, up-for-anything vibe. You might not be able to name his best solo, but it's impossible to imagine Radiohead without him."

O'Brien sings backing vocals for Radiohead, which Pitchfork described as their "most consistent secret weapon". For years, he was insecure about singing with Yorke, but became more confident after recording solo records. When writing solo, he said he found lyrics the most difficult part as he had spent his career with Radiohead focused on sounds.

In 2020, O'Brien said his role in Radiohead was to "service the songs" and support Yorke. He said: "I've always been like his older brother ... I always say that he was like the dad of the band and I'm the mum. My job was to always put my arm around him, and his job was to be Thom." Radiohead's producer, Nigel Godrich, described O'Brien as "very much a diplomat".

O'Brien is an advocate of music tuned to 432 Hz rather than standard concert pitch, and used it to recorded Blue Morpho. O'Brien believes that the frequency has healing properties and vibrates "in harmony with the cells in your body and the world around you ... The instruments sound and resonate better at this frequency, especially acoustic instruments like guitars." He said his Radiohead bandmates had dismissed the practice as "new age", but that it was growing in popularity.

=== Equipment ===
O'Brien usually plays Fender Stratocasters, particularly an Eric Clapton Stratocaster. He did not identify with classic rock guitarists famous for using Stratocasters, but found them versatile and "neutral" enough for different sounds. In the Kid A sessions, at the suggestion of Michael Brook, the creator of the Infinite Guitar, O'Brien added a sustain unit to his Clapton Stratocaster, allowing notes to be sustained indefinitely. He combined this with looping and delay effects to create synthesiser-like sounds. O'Brien worked with Fender to design a signature model guitar, the EOB Stratocaster, released in November 2017. It features a tremolo bridge and a sustainer pickup. O'Brien also plays Gretsch and Rickenbacker guitars, including a twelve-string Rickenbacker.

O'Brien's most used effects for Radiohead are distortion, an Electro-Harmonix Memory Man delay and a DigiTech Whammy pitch shifter. He described the Boss DD-5 delay pedal as important to the sound of The Bends and OK Computer. To create the high-pitched chiming sound that introduces "Lucky", O'Brien strums above the guitar nut. On "Karma Police", O'Brien distorts his guitar by driving a delay effect to self-oscillation, then lowering the delay rate, creating a "melting" effect. The ambient track "Treefingers" was created by processing O'Brien's guitar loops. On "Dollars and Cents", O'Brien uses a pitch shifter to shift his guitar chords from minor to major. He creates the reverberating pops on the introduction of "2 + 2 = 5".

For "All I Need", O'Brien used a sustain unit and a guitar strung with four bottom E strings, creating a thicker sound. O'Brien uses the EBow, an electronic sustaining device, to generate drones and ambient leads on songs such as "My Iron Lung", "Talk Show Host", "Jigsaw Falling into Place", "Where I End and You Begin" and "Nude". On The King of Limbs and A Moon Shaped Pool, he used a Klon Centaur overdrive pedal.

=== Influences ===
O'Brien's earliest guitar influence was Andy Summers of the Police, particularly his use of delay and chorus effects on "Walking on the Moon". His other influences include Peter Buck of R.E.M, Paul Weller of the Jam, Johnny Marr of the Smiths, John McGeoch of Magazine and Siouxsie and the Banshees, the Edge of U2 and Will Sergeant of Echo & the Bunnymen. O'Brien admired how these guitarists created "space" rather than playing conventional solos. He said: "They were great guitarists, but they weren't lead guitarists ... My favourite guitarists know when not to play. Then you make more of it when you do play. Make it count."

O'Brien cited the American band Phish as an influence on his solo shows, saying: "[They're] like a jazz band; they are willing to take risks for a moment of musical transcendence. That's what I'm after — I want to tap into that." Influences on Earth include Earth, Wind & Fire, Arcade Fire, Underworld, Bill Withers, Talking Heads, the "Celtic, folky" music of Led Zeppelin, and the music of Brazil, such as the music of Carnival and Jorge Ben.

== Politics and activism ==
In 2009, along with the musicians Dave Rowntree, Jazzie B, Billy Bragg, Mark Kelly, Master Shortie and Kate Nash, O'Brien co-founded the Featured Artists Coalition, a nonprofit organisation set up to protect the rights of featured musicians, particularly in the digital age. In 2014, O'Brien and Selway signed an open letter protesting a ban on guitars in British prisons and stating that music was important for rehabilitation. In April 2019, O'Brien joined the RSPB Let Nature Sing project, which aimed to get birdsong into the UK charts to raise awareness of the decline in Britain's birdlife.

In February 2025, O'Brien spoke about climate change at São Paulo International Music Week. O'Brien was one of more than 1,000 musicians to support Is This What We Want?, an album of silence released that February protesting the use of unlicensed copyrighted work to train AI. O'Brien criticised Israel following the outbreak of the Gaza war and expressed support for Palestinians, calling for the release of hostages and a ceasefire. In August 2026, O'Brien, Yorke and Selway were among 211 artists to sign a letter calling for the prime minister, Andy Burnham, to reject proposals for further drilling in the Rosebank oil and gas field.

== Personal life ==
O'Brien lives in London and Wales. His wife, Susan Kobrin, is a kinesiologist. They have a son, born in January 2004, and a daughter, born in 2006. Around 2000, O'Brien gave up alcohol, saying it was "fucking him up", and began practising meditation. The Smiths guitarist Johnny Marr helped him become sober and recover from depression. In 2012 and 2013, O'Brien and his family lived on a farm near Ubatuba, Brazil. O'Brien is a cricket fan and once played a match against the musicians Richard Thompson and Chris Martin.

== Solo discography ==
=== Studio albums ===
List of studio albums, with selected chart positions and certifications
Title	Details	Peak chart positions					
Title	Details	UK	GER	SCO	SWI	US Sales	US Heat.
Earth	Release: 17 April 2020; Label: Capitol; Formats: LP, CD, cassette, download	13	94	3	51	19	8
Blue Morpho	Release: 22 May 2026; Label: Transgressive; Formats: LP, CD, cassette, download	73	—	8	—	—	—

=== Singles ===
Title	Year	Peak chart positions		Album
Title	Year	UK Phys.	US AAA	Album
"Santa Teresa"	2019	—	—	Non-album single
"Brasil"	2019	4	—	Earth
"Shangri-La"	2020	—	5	Earth
"Olympik"	2020	—	—	Earth
"Cloak of the Night"	2020	—	—	Earth
"Slidin' (EOB Remix)"	2021	—	—	McCartney III Imagined
"Incantations"	2026	—	—	Blue Morpho
"Blue Morpho"	2026	—	—	Blue Morpho
"—" denotes a recording that did not chart or was not released in that territory.

== See also ==
- List of Old Abingdonians

== Sources ==
- Randall, Mac (2000). Exit Music: The Radiohead Story. Omnibus Press. ISBN 0-385-33393-5.
