= 05/03 =

20-03

Live album by 22-20s
- Released: 30 September 2003
- Recorded: May 2003
- Genre: Rock, blues
- Length: 23:40
- Label: Heavenly Records (UK); Astralwerks (U.S.)
- Producer: Sam Williams; Will Shapland; John Cornfield

22-20s chronology
20-03 (2003)	22-20s (2004)

05/03 is the debut live EP by English rock and blues band 22-20s. The EP was recorded in May 2003 and released on September 30, 2003.

== Track listing ==
No.	Title	Live at...	Length
1.	"Devil in Me"	Zodiac Club, Oxford	4:13
2.	"I'm the One"	Zodiac Club, Oxford	3:39
3.	"Messed Up"	Zodiac Club, Oxford	3:48
4.	"Such a Fool"	West End Theatre, Aldershot	3:52
5.	"22 Days"	Zodiac Club, Oxford	2:56
6.	"King Bee"	Zodiac Club, Oxford	5:12
