= Baby Darling Doll Face Honey =

Studio album by Band of Skulls
- Released: 7 April 2009
- Studios: Courtyard Studios, Oxfordshire
- Genres: Blues rock; indie rock; hard rock; stoner rock
- Length: 66:16
- Label: Shangri-La
- Producer: Ian Davenport

Band of Skulls chronology
Baby Darling Doll Face Honey (2009)	Sweet Sour (2012)

Singles from Baby Darling Doll Face Honey
- 1. "I Know What I Am" Released: 6 March 2009; 2. "Blood" Released: May 2009; 3. "Patterns" Released: July 2009; 4. "Fires ( Ltd 500 )"

Baby Darling Doll Face Honey is the debut album by English rock band Band of Skulls. It was released on 7 April 2009 in England and 28 July 2009 in America. The artwork is based on paintings by bass player/vocalist Emma Richardson.

Baby Darling Doll Face Honey was produced, recorded and mixed by Ian Davenport, (Supergrass, Badly Drawn Boy). It was recorded at Courtyard Studios in Oxfordshire and mixed at the House of Blues studio in Los Angeles.

The first single "I Know What I Am" was released as the single of the week in Canada. The album's first track "Light of the Morning", was featured in a television ad for the 2011 Ford Mustang.

The song "I Know What I Am" features in the music game Guitar Hero: Warriors of Rock and as a downloadable track for Rock Band through the Rock Band Network, while the song "Patterns" features in the driving simulator Gran Turismo 5.

The album debuted belatedly on the UK Indie Chart on 27 February 2010 at position 50.

== Reception ==
Professional ratings
Aggregate scores
Source	Rating
Metacritic	71/100 link
Review scores
Source	Rating
AllMusic	link

Critical reception for Baby Darling Doll Face Honey was generally positive. In the UK Classic Rock gave the album a 9 out of 10 review, stating that "the entire collection crackles with an urgency and authenticity that's as rare as it is desirable." The website PopMatters gave the album a 6 out of 10, stating that the album was:

"a mish-mash of three or four styles, recalling as many different artists, with songs written by all three band members and sung by two of them. If that sentence was dizzying to read, imagining hearing the album. It’s as if every cast member of Friends got to write and direct a different scene in a single episode. It’s as if every third letter on this page were a different color. It’s just, shall we say, a bit jarring."

Pop Matters referred to the song, "Impossible" as a mix of U2, Coldplay and Clap Your Hands Say Yeah.

== Track listing ==
No.	Title	Length
1.	"Light of the Morning"	2:44
2.	"Death by Diamonds and Pearls"	3:12
3.	"I Know What I Am"	3:18
4.	"Fires"	4:06
5.	"Honest"	3:39
6.	"Patterns"	3:38
7.	"Hollywood Bowl"	3:57
8.	"Bomb"	2:53
9.	"Impossible"	4:50
10.	"Blood"	4:14
11.	"Dull Gold Heart"	5:11
12.	"Cold Fame"	6:11

Bonus track deluxe edition
No.	Title	Length
13.	"Light of the Morning" (live from Troubadour)	3.00
14.	"I Know What I Am" (X-fm Live Session)	2.36
15.	"Fires" (X-fm Live Session)	4.14
16.	"Blood" (X-fm Live Session)	4.18
17.	"Fires" (Dimbleby & Capper Remix)	3.14

10th anniversary reissue
No.	Title	Length
1.	"Light of the Morning"	2:44
2.	"Death by Diamonds and Pearls"	3:12
3.	"I Know What I Am"	3:18
4.	"Fires"	4:06
5.	"Honest"	3:39
6.	"Patterns"	3:38
7.	"Bomb"	2:53
8.	"Impossible"	4:50
9.	"Blood"	4:14
10.	"Dull Gold Heart"	5:11
11.	"Cold Fame"	6:11
12.	"Stun Me All Wonderful"	5:23

== Personnel ==
- Russell Marsden – vocals, guitar
- Emma Richardson – vocals, bass guitar
- Matt Hayward – drums

== Charts ==
Chart performance for Baby Darling Doll Face Honey
Chart (2010)	Peak position
Belgian Albums (Ultratop Flanders)	58
Dutch Albums (Album Top 100)	97
