= 22-20s =

English blues rock band

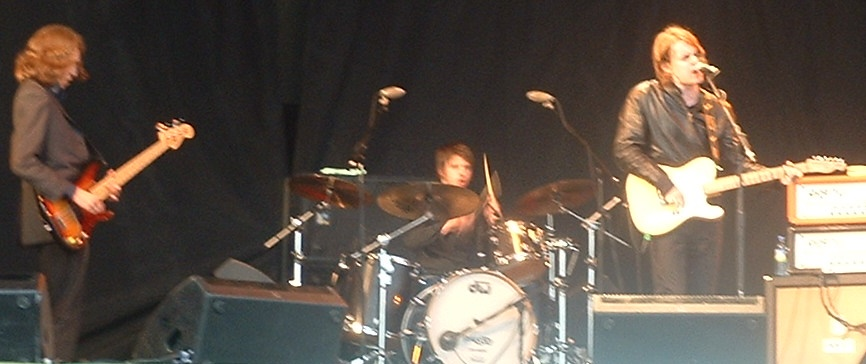
- Live Glastonbury Festival 2004

Background information
- Origin: Sleaford, Lincolnshire, England
- Genres: Rock, blues rock, indie rock
- Years active: 2002–2005, 2008–2013, 2019–2020
- Labels: Heavenly/EMI; Astralwerks, TBD (US); Yoshimoto R and C (Japan)
- Members: Martin Trimble
- Past members: Glen Bartup; James Irving; Dan Hare; Charly Coombes; Mark Barrett; Mick Nelson

22-20s were an English blues rock band, formed in 2002 in Sleaford, Lincolnshire. The band originally disbanded in December 2005 before reforming in 2008 and releasing Shake/Shiver/Moan in 2010 and Got It If You Want It in 2012. They disbanded for a second time in early 2013, before reforming again in late 2019.

The band's songs have regularly featured in adverts and films, most notably "Devil in Me" which was featured on the Vauxhall Astra television commercial in early 2016 and later a commercial for the Racing Post. They have also featured on numerous high-profile soundtracks, including the Guy Ritchie film RocknRolla, London Boulevard, Cry Wolf, Stoned, One Tree Hill, and Driver: San Francisco.

== Career ==
=== Formation to breakup ===
Fourteen miles apart in the English county of Lincolnshire, Martin Trimble grew up in Heckington, and Glen Bartup, Fulbeck, and met at Carre's Grammar School, Sleaford. In 1997 aged 14, they bought their first guitars together from a shop owned by Trimble's uncle who would come to visit at Christmas and bring with him blues records. The pair immersed themselves in blues artists such as Muddy Waters and Buddy Guy and later Bob Dylan, The Rolling Stones and T. Rex.

The duo began playing across Lincolnshire and the north of England together on the blues circuit in Crossfire, who later changed their name to Martin Trimble & Outside Help. The band also featured bassist Dave Wheeldon and a number of drummers including Rob Flanagan, Dave Raeburn of The Hoax and Mark Barrett of The Hoax who joined the band in July 2000. Their sets were composed primarily of blues covers, and they toured the country and regularly performed at blues festivals in Maryport, Colne and on the continent in Germany, Belgium and the Netherlands, before splitting in November 2001. Trimble then formed The Infidels with Natasha Allan and local session musician Gary Rudd, and The Martin Trimble band with former Outside Help/The Hoax drummer Mark Barrett and Bartup on bass, who had previously played guitar. Trimble would also occasionally perform acoustic solo gigs and as duo with Bartup.

Aged 19, Trimble, Bartup and Barrett recorded a four-song demo in Mansfield, Nottinghamshire featuring Such A Fool, 22 Days and Devil in Me, as 22-20s, named after the Skip James song "22-20 Blues", and began playing gigs more focused on original material with the occasional Muddy Waters cover. With the departure of Barrett following a record deal with a blues label that did not work out, the band toured across Europe in May 2002, for which they played with future Dakota drummer Mick Nelson, James Irving, previously of unsigned Lincoln band Thunder Monkey joined the band in August 2002, prior to the band getting re-signed.

Trimble would later go on to comment that the band found performing on the blues circuit restricting as the audiences, who were mostly in their 50s, had a very defined idea of what the genre was, and when performing their own songs they would often have promoters coming up to them saying "You can't play that! That's not blues!" and described the scene as being "a bit cabaret". Bartup revealed that prior to recruiting Irving, they had to use session drummers much older than themselves who they had to pay to rehearse and also described the blues circuit as "all sort of Blues Brothers and guys in pork pie hats".

The band first signed a publishing deal with EMI subsidiary Heavenly Records, after the band had sent a demo to the Heavenly Social venue in Nottingham which was owned by the label, and the label founder Jeff Barrett went to see the band supporting Wilko Johnson. Following a bidding war between roughly 30 record companies that was described as "the A&R scramble of the century", which involved an infamous packed gig at the Dublin Castle in Camden, being flown over to the US to meet with record company executives, and a gig where the bosses of every major American record label turned up, the band also signed a record deal with Heavenly partly because "he (Barrett) was the one guy from a record company who didn’t bother taking us out for lunch, he just took us around to his office and we got absolutely hammered till about three in the morning listening to soul records". The band then re-located to Oxford, where they recruited Charly Coombes (brother of Supergrass' Gaz and Rob Coombes) on keyboards for live duties, who subsequently joined full-time during recording sessions for the first studio album.

The band released their debut single, "Such A Fool", as a limited edition 7" in April 2003. This was followed up by the six-track live EP 05/03 (recorded May 2003) in September 2003, a decision which was influenced by the fact they were first noticed on the strength of their live show. The band then released their self-titled studio debut album in September 2004. Although the band finished recording the album in January of that year, there was a delay in getting the album mixed by Rich Costey. The album was produced by Brendan Lynch who had previously worked with Paul Weller and Primal Scream. Bartup commented that "we got him because he'd worked with Primal Scream and that was what caught our ear when a few names were bandied around – we didn't want an album that sounded like it'd been made in the 60s". Trimble stated that ""we wanted to make a rock 'n' roll record that wasn't about wearing Converse and becoming junkies – and I think we did that. Both releases were critically acclaimed. They toured the UK, US, Australia, Japan and Europe and supported Oasis, Supergrass, Graham Coxon, The Black Crowes and Kings of Leon.

After cancelling performances at V Festival, Pukkelpop, Cambridge and London reportedly due to illness on 16 August 2005, it was announced on 25 January 2006 that the band had split whilst in the process of working on their second album in New York before the new year. Trimble posted a lengthy statement on the band's website saying that "initially most bands wear their influences on their sleeve but for a number of reasons we've not been able to go beyond that first stage" and that he was "no longer comfortable with people's perception of what we represent". It was believed that Trimble was set to pursue a solo career.

Although the official press release claimed that the split had been amicable, it was later claimed that Trimble had wanted to change the direction of the band much to the reluctance of the other band members and this led to the band splitting. On splitting the band up and the effect it would have on his career, Trimble stated that "Quite frankly, I don't care if the next record sells one copy as long as it's a record I can be proud of, because of all the regrets I have, quite a few appear on the last record that I had my name on".

=== Post first split ===
Following the split, Trimble stayed in New York while the rest of the band returned home. He posted on the band's official MySpace page that he was working on new material with Bartup and suggested that he would be touring later in the year. He also confirmed that what he was working on would not be a solo album and that a new website would launch soon. The MySpace page was then deleted and a website never materialised.

Irving went on to play with Lincoln band Fuzzbox Music, before moving to London where he worked with Asylum with Cass Brown of Skunk Anansie, Hungarian band The Puzzle and Richmond band Marner Brown, who he left and was replaced by Coz Kerrigan previously of Larrikin Love before re-joining 22-20s.

Coombes formed Missing Pieces with Richard Walters, and toured as second guitarist and backing vocalist with brothers Gaz and Rob in Supergrass, before forming and fronting his own band Charly Coombes & The New Breed.

=== Reformation to second breakup ===
The band reformed in late 2008 after the band's former manager offered Trimble and Bartup some studio time, and in need of a drummer called up Irving to play on the sessions. At the time, the band did not know whether the tracks would ever be released or if they did, whether they would be as 22-20s. They were then offered a gig at the Heavenly Festival in September 2008 at the Royal Festival Hall in London at the request of Heavenly Records. The band were joined by second guitarist Dan Hare, an old school friend and formerly of fellow Sleaford band The Jubilees. Coombes was not present and is no longer involved with the band. Despite debuting a new song at the gig, a spokesman for the band claimed that there were no plans for the band to continue beyond the gig.

The band then secretly toured England under the pseudonym Bitter Pills (the title of one of the band's new songs) in September 2009, playing venues such as Oxford Jericho Tavern, Hull Adelphi, Derby Rockhouse and Northampton Picturedrome previewing new material.

With no announcement, they released their first new material in the single "Latest Heartbreak" via ATO Records subsidiary TBD Records (US home of Radiohead) digitally in the US on 29 December 2009. A 4 track EP "Latest Heartbreak Live EP" was then released digitally in the US on 9 March 2010.

A new album entitled Shake/Shiver/Moan was released in May 2010 in Japan via Yoshimoto R and C, where it went straight to No. 2 in the International Rock Chart, and in the US in June. The album was recorded in 2009 and produced by Ian Davenport who has previously worked with Supergrass, Badly Drawn Boy and more recently Band of Skulls. To promote the album, the band released live in the studio takes of new songs via their YouTube channel, Filter Magazine in the US and Rockin' On in Japan.

As well as performing on The Daily Habit on Fuel TV, the band have toured extensively in the US with The Whigs, Band of Skulls, Alberta Cross and Cage the Elephant, and returned to Japan to play at Fuji Rock Festival.

In October 2010, the band released the "Latest Heartbreak Live EP" in the UK via iTunes and undertook their first tour of England as 22-20s for five years including two sold-out shows at the Duke of Wellington in Lincoln. The band also released "Latest Outtakes" in Japan, featuring some of the first tracks they recorded when they reformed and outtakes from the Shake/Shiver/Moan sessions, and played four shows across the country. The band announced that, during November and December 2010, they would be re-locating to Minneapolis in the US, where Trimble resided with (now former) wife Katie Deatrick, Director of Publicity of the band's old US label Astralwerks, to start writing their next album.

In February 2011, a PledgeMusic campaign was launched to release Shake/Shiver/Moan outside Japan and the US. This new exclusive version of the album included the "Latest Heartbreak Live EP" and "Latest Outtakes" releases as bonus tracks.

In March 2012, the band released their third studio album, Got It If You Want It in the new year. in Japan, with a release in the US on TBD Records set for 24 July 2012. With three band members permanently based in Minneapolis, the band began playing sporadic shows in the region in March/April 2012 as a three piece, with guitarist Dan Hare still in London. On 3 May 2012 it was announced that Hare had left the band due to financial and geographical constraints, with the band stating they would continue as a three piece. The album was never released outside Japan and the band did not tour in support of it. In November 2012, Trimble revealed the band stopped touring due to the birth of his daughter 14 months earlier and also admitted that 2012 had been "a lean year in terms of writing", but hoped to have a new album finished by Summer 2013.

On 27 March 2014, the band announced on Facebook that they had split up the previous year, stating that they "took a break from it this time last year and subsequently all moved in different directions".

=== Post second split ===
Martin Trimble and his wife Katie owned and ran No. 6 Shop, which imported and sold English antiques. In 2016, Trimble briefly performed with singing-drummer fronted band Dead Man Boys Choir, who played locally around Minneapolis. He played guitar and sang backing vocals with the band, who removed all of their social media presence without releasing any material. In 2017, Trimble moved back to Sleaford with his wife and children. He currently plays drums in blues cover band Black Cabinet, with the band being fronted by singer-guitarist Gary Jobling.

James Irving, who currently resides in Saint Paul, Minnesota, now works as an estate agent/real estate broker and co-owns Grand Realty Property Management. In 2017, Irving formed the duo LowRay with singer and guitarist (and also business partner) Dan Fowlds, and released debut EP Columbia in May of the same year. He co-writes and plays drums on the material.

Glen Bartup currently works in the Department of Psychology at University of Edinburgh.

Dan Hare self-released material as Latin Wolves in 2015, and has since gone on to work as a guitar teacher. He is currently based in Leeds. When questioned on the whereabouts of the rest of the band in December 2017, Hare responded that "there may have been some contact with the others recently".

=== Aborted Second reformation ===
On 9 December 2019, the band's official Facebook page was updated with their logo. On 15 December, a post confirmed a recording session at Superfly Studios in Newark. The lineup of the band was unknown. However, drummer James Irving is still in the US and the band were working with session player Wayne Proctor.

In March 2020, frontman Martin Trimble announced via Facebook that the band would be releasing re-recordings of old songs, however the releases never happened. He also stated that the band would be touring later that year. Whilst those plans were affected by global events, as of December 2022 there has been no further communications from the band.

== Discography ==
=== Albums ===
Year	Information	UK Album Chart Position
2003	05/03: Live EP; Released: 30 September 2003; Formats: CD; Label: Heavenly (UK/EU) EMI Music Japan (Japan)	108
2004	22-20s: Debut studio album; Released: 20 September 2004; Formats: CD, Vinyl; Label: Heavenly (UK/EU) Astralwerks (US) EMI Music Japan (Japan)	40
2005	Live in Japan: Japan Only live album; Released: 28 March 2005; Formats: CD; Label: EMI Music Japan (Japan)	—
2010	Shake/Shiver/Moan: Second studio album; Released: 19 May 2010 (Japan); Formats: CD; Label: TBD (US) Yoshimoto R and C (Japan)	—
2010	Latest Outtakes: Compilation of outtakes from Shake/Shiver/Moan sessions; Released: 20 October 2010; Formats: CD; Label: Yoshimoto R and C (Japan)	—
2012	Got It If You Want It: Third studio album; Released: 7 March 2012 (Japan); Formats: CD; Label: Yoshimoto R and C (Japan)	—

=== Singles ===
Year	Single	UK Singles Chart Position	Album
2003	"Such a Fool" / "Baby, You're Not in Love"	—	22-20s
2004	"Why Don't You Do It For Me?"	41	22-20s
2004	"Shoot Your Gun"	30	22-20s
2004	"22 Days"	34	22-20s
2005	"Such a Fool" (re-issue)	29	22-20s
2009	"Latest Heartbreak" (Download only)	—	Shake/Shiver/Moan
