= Jurojin (band) =

- Origin: London, UK
- Genres: Experimental rock, world music, metal
- Years active: 2008–2017
- Label: Majestic Elder Recordings
- Past members: Nicolas Rizzi; Yves Fernandez; Simran Ghalley; James Alper; Francesco Lucidi
- Website: www.facebook.com/jurojinband

Jurojin was a five-piece experimental rock music group from London, England formed in early 2008. The band incorporated various influences into its sound, including English folk, progressive rock, Indian classical, and heavy metal. Jurojin were notable for counting among its members a classically trained Tabla player.

The band's only release would be the positively-received mini-album The Living Measure of Time, before lead vocalist James Alper left the group. Despite searches for a suitable replacement, Jurojin ultimately failed to find a new voice to front the group and the project gradually fizzled out.

== History ==
Jurojin began recording their first songs shortly after its formation in 2008, which would later appear on their first release The Living Measure of Time.

In late 2009 the band formed their own record label Majestic Elder Recordings and signed an international distribution deal with ADA/Warner which led to an initial release of the album in select territories on 7 June 2010. An update posted on their website in late 2010 set the further release in all territories to 7 March 2011.

The album received favourable coverage and reviews, with the UK's Kerrang! magazine calling it "one of the most unique albums of 2010", and Rock Sound magazine lauding its "display of maturity far in excess of the band’s apparent experience". Multiple tracks from the album received airplay on BBC Radio 1 in the UK and Triple J in Australia.

In November 2012, Jurojin announced that they were entering the studio to record their second album. By the end of the month, all percussion tracks and acoustic guitars had been recorded with progress seemingly on-track for a 2013 release. However, by January 2013 the band had stopped posting updates, leaving fans confused until over a year later.

In April 2014, Jurojin explained their sudden silence by announcing that they had parted ways with lead vocalist James Alper the previous year, claiming "[h]is heart was no longer in [the] band". An instrumental song recorded for their second album, titled Everyday, was posted and the band offered an open audition process for potential singers to email their contributions to the instrumental:

"Early last year whilst recording our new album we parted ways with James. His heart was no longer in this band, and we felt it was the right time to seek a new vocalist. We are genuinely excited about the possibilities that this has opened up for us and have since crafted a collection of songs that have pushed us in all aspects of our playing and defined our sound. We can’t wait to find that elusive missing piece of the puzzle and finally release our new music. Who are we after? An exceptional and open-minded vocalist from any genre, any gender, any style. Hard working, dedicated and with drive to push the band forward. Ideally living in the UK or nearby, under 35, and preferably with previous stage experience though not a necessity."

Despite receiving hundreds of recordings from hopeful vocalists, including prominent British musicians Lou Raven from Derelict Dream and Ashe O'Hara from TesseracT, the band never found a clear choice and failed to find a replacement for Alper.

In May 2014, Jurojin confirmed that they had still been working on their second album, despite the lack of vocalist, while simultaneously announcing that they would be collaborating with violinist Anna Phoebe of Jethro Tull. The collaboration resulted in several shows throughout 2014, including a support slot for Bob Dylan in July, and the instrumental album Between The Shadow and The Soul arriving in October.

Following the collaboration with Anna Phoebe, the band attempted to push on, posting sporadic updates over the next three years, showing band meetings as well as recording and writing sessions.

Jurojin's last social media update came on October 27, 2017.

== Music ==
Jurojin occasionally performed a variety of acoustic shows, during which the band focused primarily on its Eastern and acoustic influences that prominently feature the Tabla. In an interview with TotalRock radio in the UK, guitarist Nicolas Rizzi stated that though some of their album tracks feature in these sets, the bulk of songs performed tend to be primarily acoustic songs and never feature in their heavy sets. These are sometimes instrumental, with expanded or reduced lineups and various guest musicians.

In 2009, the band performed with beatboxer Virpal Ghalley in Barbican.

=== Discography ===
- The Living Measure of Time (2010)

=== Collaborative discography ===
- Between The Shadow and The Soul - with Anna Phoebe (2014)

== Past Members ==
- Nicolas Rizzi - Guitars
- Yves Fernandez - Bass
- Simran Ghalley - Tabla
- James Alper - Vocals
- Francesco Lucidi - Drums

Jurojin have occasionally collaborated with acclaimed violinist Anna Phoebe of Jethro Tull and Trans-Siberian Orchestra fame, and she can often be seen performing with the band at select live gigs. Likewise, members of Jurojin are part of Anna's solo band.

Occasional gigs in London can also be seen with Pach Pawar from the band Of The I or Emmanuel Rizzi (little brother of guitarist Nicolas) stepping in on second guitar.

In the band's early days their line-up included Jay Postones, of Heights and TesseracT, as a session drummer not only live but also in the studio, until the band found a permanent drummer, Francesco, for the position in 2010.
