= Got It If You Want It =

Album by 22-20s

Studio album by 22-20s
- Released: 7 March 2012 (Japan)
- Recorded: 2009
- Genre: Rock, blues
- Label: Yoshimoto R and C (Japan)
- Producer: Ian Davenport

22-20s chronology
Shake/Shiver/Moan (2010)	Got It If You Want It (2012)

Got It If You Want It is the third studio album by English rock band 22-20s. It is the second to be released since the band reformed and features second guitar Dan Hare and was released in Japan on 7 March 2012 on the Yoshimoto R and C label. Although still signed to TBD Records in the US, the album remains unreleased outside Japan, where it was released in standard and deluxe formats. Shortly after the release of the album in Japan, guitarist Dan Hare left the band.

PopMatters described it as "by no means a great album but it does serve as a pleasant reminder of some of the greats and inject hope that some of these influences will last for decades to come."

== Track listing ==
1. "Bring It Home"
2. "Pocketful of Fire"
3. "White Lines"
4. "Heart and Soul"
5. "Purple Heart"
6. "Cuts and Bruises"
7. "Only Way You Know"
8. "My Creation"
9. "A Good Thing"
10. "Little Soldiers"
11. "Cherry Red"*
12. "Death Wish Fever"*
13. "Pocketful of Fire (Demo)"*

Bonus disc

1. "All That I Need"
2. "Only Way I Know (Acoustic Demo)"
3. "Purple Heart (Acoustic Demo)"
4. "A Good Thing (Demo)"
5. "White Lines (Demo)"
6. "Ocean (Live From Fuji Rock Festival '10)"
7. "Latest Heartbreak (Live From Fuji Rock Festival '10)"
8. "Shake, Shiver And Moan (Live From Fuji Rock Festival '10)"
9. "Fire Of Love (Live From Fuji Rock Festival '10)"
10. "Devil In Me (Live From Fuji Rock Festival '10)"
- Bonus tracks
