= Shake/Shiver/Moan =

Studio album by 22-20s
- Released: 19 May 2010
- Recorded: 2009
- Genre: Rock, blues
- Label: Yoshimoto R and C (Japan); TBD (US)
- Producer: Ian Davenport

22-20s chronology
Live in Japan (2005)	Shake/Shiver/Moan (2010)	Got It If You Want It (2012)

Professional ratings
Review scores
Source	Rating
AllMusic	3.5/5 stars
PopMatters	7/10 stars
Rolling Stone	3/5 stars

Shake/Shiver/Moan is the second studio album by English rock band 22-20s. It is the first to be released since the band reformed and features second guitar Dan Hare and was released in Japan on 19 May 2010 on the Yoshimoto R and C label, and in the United States on the ATO Records sublabel TBD Records on 22 June 2010. Release details for a domestic release are currently unknown. Former keyboardist Charly Coombes appears on track "96 to 4".

== Track listing ==
No.	Title	Writer(s)	Length
1.	"Heart on a String"	Martin Trimble, Glen Bartup, James Irving, Dan Hare	5:08
2.	"Bitter Pills"	Trimble, Bartup, Irving, Hare	3:43
3.	"Talk to Me"	Trimble, Bartup, Irving, Hare	2:59
4.	"Ocean"		2:57
5.	"Latest Heartbreak"	Trimble, Bartup, Irving, Hare	3:50
6.	"Shake, Shiver and Moan"	Trimble, Bartup, Irving, Hare	5:05
7.	"4th Floor"	Trimble, Bartup, Irving, Hare	3:37
8.	"96 to 4"		3:26
9.	"Let It Go"	Trimble, Bartup, Irving, Hare	3:46
10.	"Morning Train"		3:39
Total length:			38:10

Bonus Japanese tracks*
No.	Title	Length
11.	"Latest Heartbreak" (live)	4:03
12.	"Heart on a String" (live)	4:51
13.	"Ocean" (live)	3:16
14.	"Shake, Shiver and Moan" (live)	5:21

- Japan only bonus tracks – previously released on the U.S only digital EP Latest Heartbreak Live EP.
