= Leaves (Icelandic band) =

- Origin: Reykjavík, Iceland
- Genres: Indie rock, indie pop, chamber pop, dream pop, psychedelic pop
- Years active: 2000–present
- Labels: B-Unique, Island

Leaves are an Icelandic indie band formed in 2000.

== History ==
Vocalist Arnar Gudjonsson was formerly the guitarist with Mower, and he was joined by Hallur Hallsson (bass guitar), Arnar Ólafsson (guitar, accordion), Bjarni Grímsson (drums), and Andri Ásgrímsson (keyboards). Late in 2001 they played with Emiliana Torrini and drew early praise from the New York Times. They came to prominence in 2002 with their single "Race" (which reached number 66 in the UK Singles Chart), and début album, Breathe, drawing comparisons to groups such as Coldplay, Muse, The Verve and Doves. The album was released in the UK first to positive reviews, reaching number 71 in the UK Albums Chart, then was re-released in the United States, and a tour of both the UK and the U.S. followed. Their second album, The Angela Test, was released in 2005 and their third album, We Are Shadows, was released in 2009. The group's most recent album, See You in the Afterglow, arrived in 2013. In 2016, the group released a reworked version of "Breathe". In 2017 vocalist Arnar formed a solo project, Warmland.

The name of the band refers to Nick Drake's first album Five Leaves Left.

== Members ==
Current

- Arnar Guðjónsson: lead vocals, piano, guitar
- Elís Pétursson: bass guitar
- Nói Steinn Einarsson: drums
- Andri Ásgrímsson: keyboards

Former

- Arnar Ólafsson: guitar, backing vocals
- Bjarni Grímsson: drums
- Hallur Hallsson: bass guitar

== Discography ==
=== Albums ===
- Breathe (2002), B-Unique – UK #71
- The Angela Test (2005), Universal/Island
- We Are Shadows (2009)
- See You in the Afterglow (2013)

=== Singles ===
- "Breathe" (2002), B-Unique – UK #99
- "Race" (2002), B-Unique – UK #66
- "Catch" (2002), B-Unique – split single with The Coral and Electric Soft Parade – UK #81
- "Silence" (2002), B-Unique
- "The Sensualist" (2013)
