= The Race (band) =

English indie rock band

- Genre: Indie rock
- Years active: 2004 - present
- Label: Shifty Disco
- Members: Dan Buchanan; Jess Del Rio; James Del Rio; Graeme Moorcroft; Andy Aitken

The Race is an English indie rock band formed in 2004 in Reading, Berkshire, England. Likened to bands such as U2 and Arcade Fire by music magazines the NME, Drowned in Sound and The Fly. Buchanan's vocals have a strong, Cure-like quality, the band released their first long-playing album in 2006 through Shifty Disco Records (home to Young Knives and [aperlung). Following the album release, the band toured, including residencies at Club NME, as well as appearances at Truck Festival and Reading Festival.

In January 2007, the band recorded a session for Huw Stephens (BBC Radio 1) at the Maida Vale Studios. The band already had secured radio airplay, having previously performed a session for XFM in June 2005.

The band's second album, In My Head It Works, was released in 2009. Marketing for the record included a "Pass It On" campaign - a chain letter-style process that distributes promotional copies of the album across the country.

== Band members ==
- Dan Buchanan (vocals, casiotone, glockenspiel)
- Jessica del Rio (guitar, vocals)
- James del Rio (guitar)
- Graeme Moorcroft (bass)
- Andrew Aitken (drums)

== Discography ==
=== Singles ===
- "Raising Children" / "Go Figure" (Shifty Disco, 13 June 2005)
- "Amersham Road" / "Hope Song" (Shifty Disco, 3 October 2005)
- "When It Falls" (Shifty Disco, 13 November 2006)
- "Comfort, Comfort" (Shifty Disco, 19 March 2007)

=== Albums ===
- Be Your Alibi (Shifty Disco, 11 September 2006)
- In My Head It Works (Shifty Disco, 9 March 2009)
