= Bleech =

British alternative rock band

- Origin: London, England
- Genres: Alternative rock, rock, post-Britpop, grunge
- Years active: 2009–2014
- Labels: Ban*Jam, Billie Dog, XIII Bis
- Members: Jennifer O'Neill; Katherine O'Neill; Matt Bick

Bleech were an English alternative rock band formed in London in 2009.

== History ==
=== Formation ===
Sisters Jennifer and Katherine O'Neill got together with former school friend Matt Bick to form the band in 2009 in Forest Gate, London. They were soon noticed by former Food Records boss Andy Ross, and played at his Camden Crawl festival that year.

=== Early days (2009–2011) ===
One of the first venues the band played was the Ruskin Arms in Manor Park, London. The pub was renowned as the original rehearsal space for Small Faces and one of the first venues Iron Maiden played.

With the release of their first single, "Is It True That Boys Don't Cry?", Bleech swiftly gained approval from the music media, including places on the NME '10 Tracks You Have To Hear This Week' list, NME Radio A-list, BBC Radio 6 playlist and Gill Mills' Best of Myspace list. Their second single, "The Worthing Song", was also on the NME Radio A-list and Single of the Month in Clash Magazine. Clash also featured "Mondays" on a free download compilation album of their top tracks of the month. By the end of 2009, Bleech had supported several top acts, including Wolfmother, The Charlatans, Pete Doherty, The Kooks and The Rifles.

In 2011, Bleech became the face of the Kangol Autumn/Winter 2011 campaign, which included a photo shoot with renowned music photographer Janette Beckman and a performance at the Aerial7 launch party in New York. They also signed a worldwide publishing deal with Bucks Music Group that year and released their first EP, Deadhead.

=== Nude (2012–2013) ===
In June 2012, Bleech released their first album, Nude. Days after the launch, they were announced as one of the support acts asked to perform at #ASH20, the 20th birthday celebration of Ash, hosted by Josie Long. Shortly after #ASH20, rock music magazine Kerrang! featured an article on Bleech. In August 2012, Bleech played at the Y Not Festival and released their second EP, The Hippie & Me.

British super-middleweight boxer Frank Buglioni appeared in the band's "Break My Nose" video in October 2012. The video was nominated for Best Music Video at the Limelight Film Awards 2013.

The Fédération des Radios Associatives Rock, a collection of independent French radio stations, listed Nude at number 15 on their Feraliste (a chart of the albums most played by their member stations) for April 2013.

Their second album, Humble Sky, was released on 10 March 2014.

== Line-up ==
- Jennifer O'Neill – lead vocals, lead guitar
- Katherine O'Neill – bass, backing vocals
- Matt Bick – drums, backing vocals

== Discography ==
=== Studio albums ===
- Nude (2012)
- Humble Sky (2014)

=== EPs ===
- Deadhead (2011)
- The Hippie & Me (2012)

=== Singles ===
- "Is It True That Boys Don’t Cry?" (2009)
- "The Worthing Song" (2009)
- "Mondays" (2012)
- "Adrenalin Junkie" (2012)
- "Break My Nose" (2012)
- "Not Like You" (2013)
