= Jesse Roper =

Jesse Lee Roper
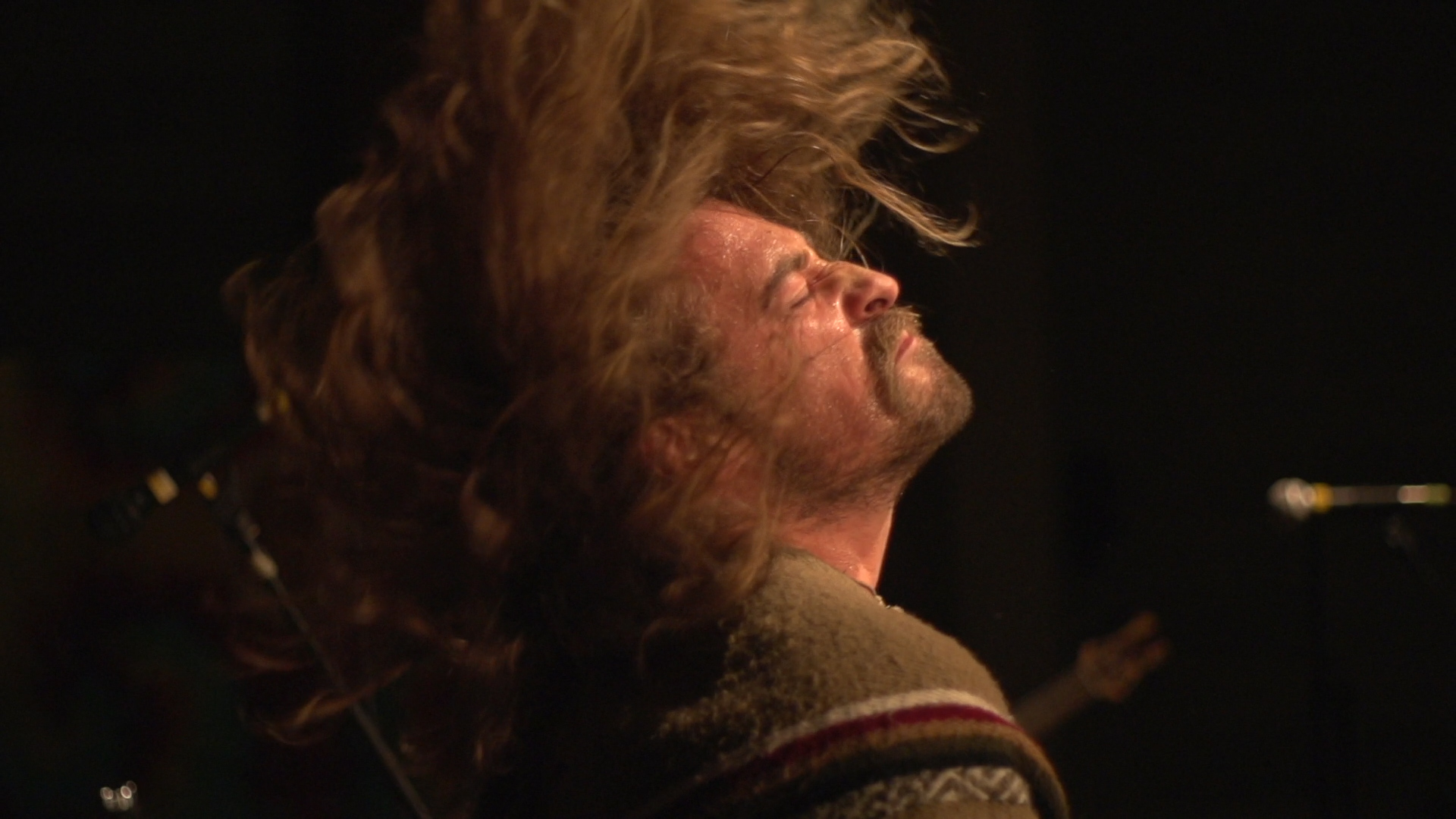
- The Roper Show performs at Rifflandia Music Festival, Victoria, BC, 2014

Background information
- Born: 1982 (age 43–44); Victoria, British Columbia, Canada
- Origin: Metchosin, British Columbia, Canada
- Genres: Canadian blues, Blues, Rock Music, Funk
- Occupation: Musician
- Instruments: Guitar, vocals
- Years active: 2009–present
- Website: www.jesseroper.ca

Jesse Roper (born 1982) is a Canadian blues musician from Victoria, British Columbia, Canada.

== Early life ==
Jesse Roper was born and raised in the rural community of Metchosin, British Columbia. He first started playing the guitar at age six when his father bought him a guitar after he had shown interest in playing. Roper did not, however, perform on stage until his late-twenties due to a fear of public performance. "I was scared to go on stage or play in front of people," he stated in 2014. "My buddies in high school all knew I played guitar, but I kind of hid it away. I had no desire to play in a band. It was very closeted for me." Before deciding to pursue a career as a professional musician Roper worked at various jobs, including working as a painter for eight years, but found that he "was busy, but wasn't happy."

== Career ==
Jesse Roper began 2015 with the release of his second album Red Bird at a sold out release show in Victoria BC at Sugar Nightclub (cap 650). The success of this performance helped build his brand as a live performer and he then became a go-to west coast festival draw. His work at festivals during this time allowed him to perform in direct support slots with artists such as Keith Urban, Lee Brice, Colin James, Tower of Power, Spirit of the West and Beth Hart. in 2015, Roper played twelve festivals (including Rock the Shores, Rifflandia, Sunfest, Burnaby Roots and Blues), three industry festivals including Folk Alliance International in Kansas City, CMW in Toronto ON and Break Out West in Victoria BC, with dozens of headlining and support dates throughout. Jesse Roper’s Red Bird album was nominated for a 2015 West Coast Music Award for Best Blues recording and invited to represent Victoria and showcase at the 2015 WCMA Gala.

Since the release of his Red Bird album, Jesse Roper has also released a new radio single, Cupid, which he recorded at Bear Creek Studios with producer Ryan Hadlock (Vance Joy, Lumineers, Foo Fighters). Exploring the publishing industry, Jesse Roper has licensed his music for two ads with CN Rail as well as Salomon Skis and Colorado based brewery, Upslope.

== Discography ==
- "Horizons" (2022)
- "Access to Infinity" (2018)
- "Red Bird" (January 23, 2015)
- "Son of John" (2013)
- "The Roper Show EP" (2012)

=== Singles ===
- "Turn It Up" (2024)
- "Roll This Stone" (2024)
- "True Lovin' Ain't Easy" (2024)
- "Georgia Train" (2024)
- "Way Down In The Valley" (2024)
- "Suntan Woman" (2024)
- "Trash Can" (2023)
- "Throw This Rope" (2023)
- "Make It All Work Out" (2023)
- "Drivin' East" (2020)
- "Gotta Have It" (2018)
- "Cupid" (2015)
- "Hurricane's Eye" (2015)
- "Yukon Girl" (2013)
- "Hail Mary" (2013)

== See also ==
- Music of Canada
- Canadian rock
- List of Canadian musicians
- List of bands from Canada
- Category:Canadian musical groups
