= Medal (band) =

English alternative rock band

- Origin: Oxford, England
- Genres: Alternative rock
- Years active: 1998–2001 (earlier as The Daisies)
- Labels: Polydor, El Producto
- Members: Jamie Hyatt; Mark Willis; Simon Wickson; Richard Brincklow; Ollie Wilcox
- Past members: Daniel Kemp

Medal were an English alternative rock band from Oxford.

== History ==
The band grew out of earlier band The Daisies, who had been active since the early 1990s and released the album "Kowloon House" in the US on Capitol Records and the single "If I Was Barry White" in 1996 on Regal Recordings in the UK. They also toured the US in 1995 supporting fellow Oxford band Supergrass. The Daisies line-up of Jamie Hyatt (vocals, guitar), Mark Willis (guitar), Daniel Kemp (bass), and Simon Wickson (drums) were joined by keyboard player Richard Brincklow and the band became Medal and signed to Polydor Records. Early singles "Ordinary", "Possibility", and "Up Here For Hours" received a lot of airplay on BBC Radio 1, and saw the band compared to The Verve. The band's debut album, Drop Your Weapon, was released in June 1999 (on A&M in the United States), and support slots with label mates Cast, The Bluetones and The Dandy Warhols followed. The album prompted the description "Indescribably complicated and bewilderingly pretentious and that's only the cover" from the NME, who compared the album to Pink Floyd's The Dark Side of the Moon. After the Porno Song EP on Polydor, Kemp left the band (replaced eventually by former Fuzzgun bassist Ollie) and they were also dropped by Polydor, prompting them to set up their own El Producto label. After two singles, the band issued their second album, Stuntman, in 2001. The band split up soon after, without touring the album or any official announcement.

The Daisies reformed for one night to bid farewell to the Zodiac venue in Oxford in May 2007. The band were the first act to perform at the venue when it opened in 1995.

Hyatt now fronts another Oxford band "The Family Machine", who formed in 2006 and released their debut album "You Are The Family Machine" in March 2008 on Alcopop Records.

== Discography ==
=== Singles ===
- "Ordinary" (1998) Polydor
- "Possibility" (1999) Polydor
- "Up Here For Hours" (1999) Polydor
- Porno Song EP (1999) Polydor
- "Fingerprints" (2000) El Producto
- "Stuntman" (2001) El Producto

=== Albums ===
- Drop Your Weapon (1999) Polydor
- Stuntman (2001) El Producto
