= Of Empires =

Of Empires are a Brighton based rock band, formed in Guernsey, Channel Islands. The band consists of Jack Fletcher (lead vocals), Liam Bewey (bass guitar, backing vocals), Matthew Berry (lead guitar, backing vocals), and George Le Page (drums, backing vocals).

The band have released two EP's. Following the first EP Stranger Sensations (2014), many music journalists rated the band as ones to watch for 2015. The Guardian described the EP as 'stomping, slow-motion riff-rock with snarling vocals and terrace-worthy choruses.'

The Stranger Sensations sessions were recorded in May 2014 in Brighton's vintage analogue studio, The Toy Rooms, on the south coast of England. Home to producers Pablo Clements and James Griffith (Psychonauts/Unkle/Toydrum) and Nick Cave's favourite city studio. Stranger Sensations was recorded with engineer, Ben Thackeray (Oasis), and mixed by Jon Gray (Kooks, The Subways, The Coral, The Zutons and Editors).

In December 2014 the band won MTV Brand New for 2015 Unsigned and in January 2015 filmed a live session at MTV Studios, subsequently being broadcast across the MTV network. They also got to play at the Great Escape Festival in Brighton.

Of Empires were featured in an article by Brighton's local paper The Argus along with James Bay and Anushka as three acts poised to make it big, outside the city, in 2015.

As well as national and local press, Stranger Sensations received regular national airplay on 30 BBC radio stations across the UK on the BBC Introducing network and the video for "I Want You To Get Mad" was added to the MTV Rocks playlist in February 2015 being broadcast daily on Sky 354 - Virgin 315. The band will be featured on Huw Stephens's BBC Introducing show on Radio 1 on 25 March.

In May 2017 Of Empires released their second EP "See You with the Angels, Kid" which also got noticed abroad.
