= The Troubadours =

English rock band

- Origin: Liverpool/Runcorn/Wigan, England
- Genres: Rock, pop
- Years active: 2005-2009, 2011-present
- Labels: Loog Records, BMG Japan
- Members: Mark Frith; Tony Anthony Ferguson; Nathan "Elmo" Watts; Johnny Molyneux
- Website: www.the-troubadours.co.uk

The Troubadours are an English rock band comprising members from Liverpool, Runcorn and Wigan. The band was originally formed by Mark Frith and Johnny Molyneux in 2005, and they split in late 2009 but reformed in late 2011. Their debut single, "Gimme Love" was released in 2007, and reached Number 20 on the Radio 1 Indie Chart in November. Their second single, "(I'm Not) Superstitious" was released in June 2008 reaching Number 8 in the UK Indie Singles Chart. Their album The Troubadours was never released in the UK but was successful in Japan securing a top ten chart placing and single "Gimme Love" spent three months on top of the MTV Japan video chart.

== History ==
The Troubadours originally started in 2005, when Mark Frith (songwriter/lead vocalist/guitarist) decided to get a band together to play his growing number of self-penned songs. He began work with Johnny Molyneux (lead guitar) immediately. Without a bassist or a drummer, he put adverts in local newspapers in and around the Liverpool area. with the name The Troubadours already born, the band soon recruited Tony Ferguson to play bass, and Nathan Watts to be their drummer after both expressed a strong interest in joining the band.

After countless gigs, they built up a large fan base, amongst them was the record producer, John Leckie, known for his previous work with The Stone Roses, Pink Floyd and Radiohead. In 2007, Leckie offered to produce two of their songs, which the band accepted. They recorded "Gimme Love" and "Here Comes The Tide" under the production of John Leckie in May 2007 at the Dog House Studios in Henley-on-Thames. Their debut single, "Gimme Love" was released soon after recordings were finished.

In the February 2008 edition of Q magazine, the Troubadours were included in the "10 Best New Acts of 2008". 2008 also saw the band support Paul Weller during his UK tour. Their second single, "(I'm Not) Superstitious" was released in June 2008.

The summer of 2008 saw the band playing many festivals including V festival in Chelmsford/Stafford and Summer Sonic Festival in Tokyo. Late 2008 saw the departure of original lead guitarist, Johnny Molyneux. The permanent replacement was announced to be Robbie Taylor in January 2009.

The recording and mixing of their debut album was completed in September 2008, and was released in Japan in the same month. The album was originally supposed to be released in early/mid-2009, but was pushed to an early 2010 release.

In late 2009 the band went into a supposed hiatus after heavy touring schedules through 2008 and 2009. But it turned out that the band had actually split. Even though many sources close to the band already knew of the split, it was confirmed on 8 June by Frith, who posted a message to fans on the networking site, Facebook.

The Troubadours announced in October 2011 that they would be reforming and went on to perform a sell-out show at the Liverpool Lomax on Friday 23 December.

== Sound and influences ==
The Troubadours' style comes from a blend of genres such as 1950s rockabilly, 1960s garage and blues. Their trademark tunes have been noted by both Paul Weller and John Leckie as 'classic British songwriting'. They have been influenced by Beefheart, Love, The Rolling Stones and The Seeds. The band members also cite The Byrds, Bob Dylan, The Stone Roses and The Who as other major influences.

Their sound has been compared to many other, more recent bands from the north-west of England, including The La's, The Coral, Cast and The Zutons. Friths vocal style has been compared to that of the frontman of The La's, Lee Mavers.

== Members ==
- Mark Frith (lead vocals, guitar, piano, harmonica) (2005–present)
- Johnny Molyneux (lead guitar, backing vocals) (2005–present)
- Tony Ferguson (bass guitar, backing vocals) (2005–present)
- Nathan "Elmo" Watts (drums) (2006–present)
