= The Angela Test =

Studio album by Leaves
- Released: 2005
- Genre: Psychedelic pop, indie rock, indie pop
- Length: 53:31
- Label: Universal

Leaves chronology
Breathe (2002)	The Angela Test (2005)	We Are Shadows (2009)

The Angela Test is a 2005 album by Icelandic indie rock band Leaves. The Angela Test charted in the top 15 in weeks 33-35 in the Icelandic Topplistinn chart. In week 33 the album charted 9th, in week 34 it charted 12th and in week 35 it charted 6th.

== Track listing ==
No.	Title	Length
1.	"Shakma (Drunken Starlit Sky)"
2.	"Whatever"
3.	"The Spell"
4.	"As We Walk"
5.	"Angela Test"
6.	"Good Enough"
7.	"Killing Flies"
8.	"Silver Night"
9.	"The Transparent"
10.	"Should Have Seen It All..."

== Reception ==
The Angela Test
Review scores
Source	Rating
Pitchfork	6.2/10

Adam Moerder of Pitchfork said The Angela Test sounded similarly to the sound of Coldplay while Chris Saunders of musicOMH said the album was likable from the core.
