= 2025 Radiohead tour =

European concert tour

- Tour by Radiohead
- Promotional poster
- Location: Europe
- Start date: 4 November 2025
- End date: 16 December 2025
- No. of shows: 20
- Producer: 13 Artists

The 2025 Radiohead tour was a concert tour of Europe by the English rock band Radiohead. It was Radiohead's first tour in seven years, with 20 concerts across Madrid, Bologna, London, Berlin and Copenhagen. The tour began on 4 November at the Movistar Arena in Madrid and ended on 16 December at the Royal Arena in Copenhagen. It received positive reviews. A tour of Australia and Japan is scheduled for 2027.

== Background ==
Radiohead released their ninth album, A Moon Shaped Pool, in 2016, and toured Europe, Japan, and North and South America in 2016, 2017 and 2018. Following the tour, Radiohead went on hiatus and the members worked on side projects. They abandoned plans to tour in 2021 due to the COVID-19 pandemic. The guitarist Ed O'Brien believed he was finished with Radiohead, saying he no longer "resonated" with it.

In 2024, Radiohead reconvened to rehearse and explore the possibility of reuniting. O'Brien said: "The chemistry was there from the very beginning. I think we always knew that if we got the love between us right, then it all flows from there." The drummer, Philip Selway, wrote: "After a seven-year pause, it felt really good to play the songs again and reconnect with a musical identity that has become lodged deep inside all five of us." In October, the singer, Thom Yorke, addressed speculation of a reunion, saying Radiohead had "earned the right to do what makes sense to us without having to explain ourselves or be answerable to anyone else's historical idea of what we should be doing".

In March 2025, Radiohead formed a limited liability partnership, RHEUK25 LLP, which some interpreted to mean "Radiohead Europe UK 2025", triggering speculation. Shortly after, tickets to a "Radiohead concert of your choice" were included in an auction to raise funds for a school, with a source confirming to Resident Advisor that Radiohead were booked for a European residency later that year. On 3 September, flyers appeared in European cities advertising shows in London and Copenhagen.

== Shows ==
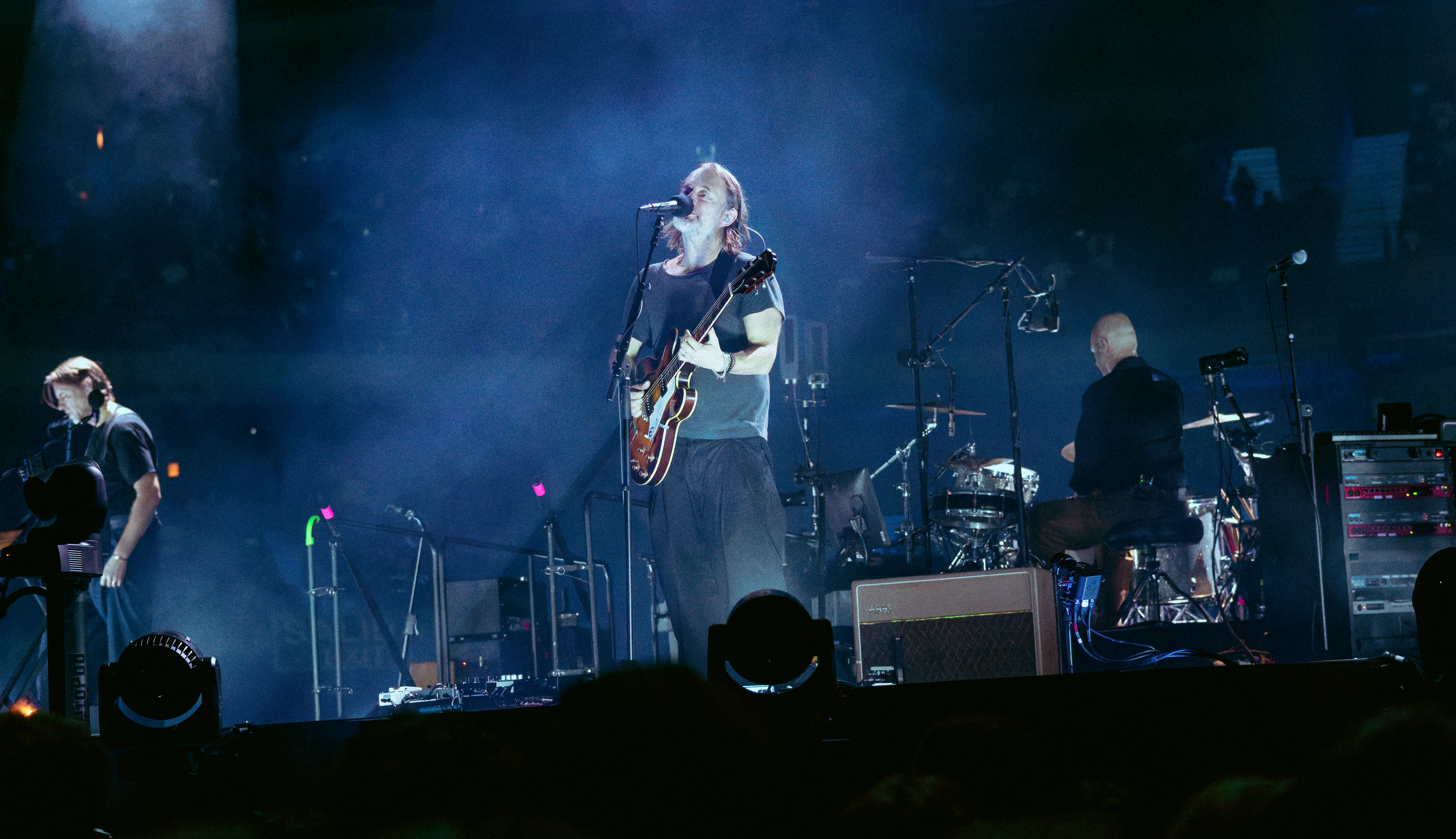
Radiohead in Madrid on 8 November 2025. From left: Ed O'Brien, Thom Yorke, Philip Selway

Radiohead announced the tour on 3 September 2025. It ran between 4 November and 12 December, with performances in Madrid, Bologna, London, Berlin and Copenhagen. Radiohead played a limited run of shows to avoid exhaustion and "going through the motions", and enlisted the Music Industry Therapist Collective to support the mental wellbeing of their touring crew. The Copenhagen performances were postponed by two weeks after Yorke developed a throat infection.

Radiohead performed in the round, with the stage sometimes obscured by video panels. O'Brien said the circular stage made the large venues feel smaller, and that "the energy flows out from all angles and you're not pushing in order to get to the back ... It was very freeing." Radiohead were joined by the additional drummer Chris Vatalaro, replacing Clive Deamer from earlier tours. The guitarists used wireless systems for the first time, having never been satisfied with their sound quality before. The shows ended with an abridged version of the Universal Declaration of Human Rights displayed on the screens.

O'Brien said the tour was "very emotional, very profound ... We'd look at one another on that stage, like, 'This is amazing.'" Selway felt Radiohead's first Berlin performance on the tour was the best they had ever given, and said he hoped they would continue touring for years. In September 2026, Radiohead announced a tour of Japan and Australia to begin in May 2027.

== Ticketing ==
Tickets were purchased by registering on Radiohead's website, with most allocated to people living nearest to the venues. Radiohead said the registration was to combat bots and ticket touts and aimed to distribute tickets "in a fair and geographically convenient way". On 13 November, Radiohead and dozens of other artists signed a letter to the prime minister, Keir Starmer, urging the British government to combat touts.

All ticket sales outside the UK include a €1 donation to Médecins Sans Frontières; Radiohead matched the total donation. The UK sales include a £1 donation to the UK-based trust fund Live Trust to support grassroots venues and entertainment. The London shows also generated funds for the Samaritans charity, for which Selway is an ambassador. The final London show was attended by 22,355 people, a new attendance record for the O2 Arena.

Boycott, Divestment and Sanctions, which campaigns for an international cultural boycott of Israel, called for a boycott of Radiohead's tour, criticising Radiohead's 2017 performance in Tel Aviv and Jonny Greenwood's recent performances there. According to The Guardian, after reporting on the boycott, Guardian journalists were blocked from receiving tickets to review the first performance.

== Reception ==
The chief Telegraph music critic, Neil McCormick, gave the first show, in Madrid, four out of five. In Rolling Stone, Angie Martoccio wrote that Radiohead "deliver magic in Madrid ... It would be easy to call this a cash grab, but as they've proved over the past seven years, they don't need to do these shows. This was for the fans." Reviewing a Berlin show for Magnet, Corey duBrowa wrote that Radiohead "plough a determinedly unique and independent musical furrow, far above the heads of the majority of their musical peers".

In Rolling Stone UK, Will Richards gave the first London show five out of five, writing that "this is without doubt the greatest songbook of the last 30 years, and its power only continues to grow". NME's Andrew Trendell also awarded the show five out of five and wrote: "For a band once embarrassed by the notion of 'arena rock', nobody does it better. A new album and another night like this can’t come soon enough." Reviewing a London performance for Mojo, Danny Eccleston wrote that Radiohead "are still unique, and great, and always morphing, sometimes radically, sometimes subtly". The senior Rolling Stone writer Andy Greene said the changing set lists created an "exciting, unpredictable energy".

== Set list ==
The following set list is taken from the concert held on 4 November, 2025, in Madrid. It does not represent all concerts.

1. "Let Down"
2. "2 + 2 = 5"
3. "Sit Down. Stand Up"
4. "Bloom"
5. "Lucky"
6. "Ful Stop"
7. "The Gloaming"
8. "Myxomatosis"
9. "No Surprises"
10. "Videotape"
11. "Weird Fishes / Arpeggi"
12. "Everything in Its Right Place"
13. "15 Step"
14. "The National Anthem"
15. "Daydreaming"
16. "A Wolf at the Door"
17. "Bodysnatchers"
18. "Idioteque"

Encore

19. "Fake Plastic Trees"
20. "Subterranean Homesick Alien"
21. "Paranoid Android"
22. "How to Disappear Completely"
23. "You and Whose Army?"
24. "There There"
25. "Karma Police"

== Tour dates ==
List of 2025 concerts
| Date (2025) | City | Country | Venue | Attendance | Revenue |
|---|---|---|---|---|---|
| 4 November | Madrid | Spain | Movistar Arena | 68,737 / 68,737 | $12,200,000 |
| 5 November | Madrid | Spain | Movistar Arena | 68,737 / 68,737 | $12,200,000 |
| 7 November | Madrid | Spain | Movistar Arena | 68,737 / 68,737 | $12,200,000 |
| 8 November | Madrid | Spain | Movistar Arena | 68,737 / 68,737 | $12,200,000 |
| 14 November | Casalecchio di Reno (Note: Promoted as Bologna) | Italy | Unipol Arena | — | — |
| 15 November | Casalecchio di Reno | Italy | Unipol Arena | — | — |
| 17 November | Casalecchio di Reno | Italy | Unipol Arena | — | — |
| 18 November | Casalecchio di Reno | Italy | Unipol Arena | — | — |
| 21 November | London | England | The O_{2} Arena | 78,500 / 78,500 | $14,600,000 |
| 22 November | London | England | The O_{2} Arena | 78,500 / 78,500 | $14,600,000 |
| 24 November | London | England | The O_{2} Arena | 78,500 / 78,500 | $14,600,000 |
| 25 November | London | England | The O_{2} Arena | 78,500 / 78,500 | $14,600,000 |
| 4 December | Copenhagen | Denmark | Royal Arena | — | — |
| 5 December | Copenhagen | Denmark | Royal Arena | — | — |
| 8 December | Berlin | Germany | Uber Arena | — | — |
| 9 December | Berlin | Germany | Uber Arena | — | — |
| 11 December | Berlin | Germany | Uber Arena | — | — |
| 12 December | Berlin | Germany | Uber Arena | — | — |
| 15 December (Note: Rescheduled from 1 and 2 December due to Thom Yorke's health concerns.) | Copenhagen | Denmark | Royal Arena | — | — |
| 16 December | Copenhagen | Denmark | Royal Arena | — | — |
| Total | | | | — | — |

== Personnel ==
=== Radiohead ===
- Thom Yorke
- Colin Greenwood
- Ed O'Brien
- Philip Selway
- Jonny Greenwood

=== Touring member ===
- Chris Vatalaro – drums
