= Let Down (Radiohead song) =

1997 song

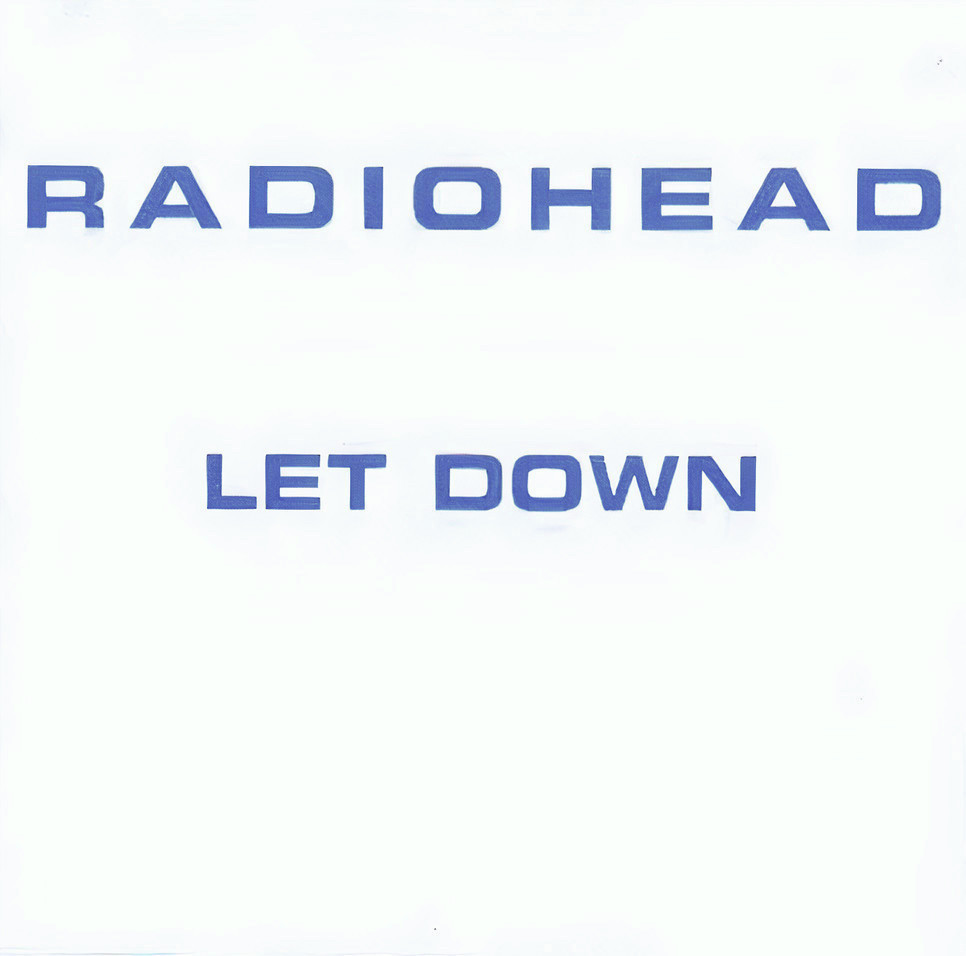
- Promo CD issued in the US

Promotional single by Radiohead

from the album OK Computer
- Released: 6 September 1997
- Genre: Alternative rock; art rock
- Length: 4:59 (album version); 4:27 (single version)
- Label: Parlophone; Capitol
- Songwriter: Radiohead
- Producers: Nigel Godrich; Radiohead

Licensed audio
- "Let Down" on YouTube

"Let Down" is a song by the English rock band Radiohead, released on their third studio album, OK Computer (1997). It contains multilayered arpeggiated guitars and electric piano in different time signatures, and lyrics inspired by a disconnection from emotion.

"Let Down" was released as a promotional single in September 1997 and reached number 29 on the US Modern Rock Tracks chart. In 2025, after it became popular on the social media platform TikTok, "Let Down" debuted at number 91 on the Billboard Hot 100, Radiohead's first entry since their 2008 single "Nude".

== Recording ==
Radiohead recorded "Let Down" at 3 am in the ballroom of St Catherine's Court in Bath, Somerset, with the producer Nigel Godrich. It was influenced by Phil Spector. It contains multilayered arpeggiated guitars and electric piano. Jonny Greenwood plays his guitar part in a different time signature to the other instruments, creating a phasing effect inspired by the American composer Steve Reich. He also added an arpeggio generated with a ZX Spectrum computer.

Thom Yorke originally recorded vocals for two additional verses, but neither felt right for the song. Instead, the band combined both vocals to create the final verse, with the overlapping "you know where you are" and "one day I am gonna grow wings" verses. Yorke and Greenwood felt the song was too long and wanted to fade it out during the instrumental bridge, but were persuaded against it by Godrich and the other band members.

== Lyrics ==
Yorke said the lyrics were about a fear of being trapped, and "about that feeling that you get when you're in transit but you're not in control of it—you just go past thousands of places and thousands of people and you're completely removed from it". Of the lines "Don't get sentimental / It always ends up drivel", Yorke said: "Sentimentality is being emotional for the sake of it. We're bombarded with sentiment, people emoting. That's the letdown. Feeling every emotion is fake. Or rather every emotion is on the same plane whether it's a car advert or a pop song." Yorke felt that scepticism of emotion was characteristic of Generation X and that it had informed OK Computer. The guitarist Ed O'Brien described "Let Down" as the album's "emotional heart".

== Live performances ==
Radiohead have rarely performed "Let Down" live. After 2006, it was not performed until the tour for Radiohead's album A Moon Shaped Pool (2016). Radiohead performed it as the first song of their first show of their 2025 tour, their first show in seven years, and performed it at every show of the tour. The multitrack recording makesit difficult to recreate live, especially the layering of vocal parts. Yorke typically opted to sing the backing vocal instead of the final verse.

== Release ==
Yorke fought to exclude "Let Down" from OK Computer, but O'Brien insisted. Plans to release it as a single were abandoned as Radiohead were unhappy with the music video. "Paranoid Android" was released instead, which, along with "Karma Police", solidified Radiohead's popularity. "Let Down" reached No. 29 in the US Hot Modern Rock Tracks chart. In 2006, it was covered by the Easy Star All-Stars on Radiodread, a cover album of OK Computer in ska, dub and reggae styles.

In June 2025, after it became popular on the social media platform TikTok, "Let Down" debuted at number 20 on the US Bubbling Under Hot 100 and Hot Rock & Alternative Songs charts. It was Radiohead's first entry on the Hot Rock & Alternative Songs chart since their debut single, "Creep" (1992). "Let Down" also reached number 85 on the UK singles chart. In August, it debuted at number 91 on the Billboard Hot 100. It was Radiohead's fourth entry on the Hot 100 and their first since their 2008 single "Nude". Yorke said the development was "bizarre". O'Brien said he was astonished, but that his children told him: "What do you expect? Teenagers are depressed. It's depressing music!"

On 18 February, 2026, US Immigration and Customs Enforcement (ICE) used "Let Down" in social media posts allegedly depicting victims of violence by illegal immigrants. The posts were shared by social media accounts for Donald Trump, the White House and the Department of Homeland Security as part of a response to public backlash against ICE. On 26 February, Radiohead issued a statement demanding the song's removal, saying: "It ain't funny, this song means a lot to us and other people, and you don't get to appropriate it without a fight. Also, go fuck yourselves."

== Reception ==
Writing for The New York Times in 2017, Charles Aaron wrote that "Let Down" was "perhaps the band's pinnacle of sheer melodic beauty ... It's quintessentially Britpop in sound, but with little of the coked-out, neo-liberal triumphalism." He felt that despite the pain of the lyrics it had "an undeniably uplifting, redemptive sentiment".

== Track listing ==
CD promo single

1. "Let Down" – 4:59
2. "Let Down" (edit) – 4:27
3. "Karma Police" – 4:21

== Charts ==
=== Weekly charts ===
1997 chart performance for "Let Down"
Chart (1997)	Peak position
US Modern Rock Tracks (Billboard)	29

2025 chart performance for "Let Down"
Chart (2025)	Peak position
Canada Hot 100 (Billboard)	71
Global 200 (Billboard)	99
Greece International (IFPI)	90
Ireland (IRMA)	73
Lithuania (AGATA)	95
New Zealand Catalogue Singles (RMNZ)	12
Sweden Heatseeker (Sverigetopplistan)	4
UK Singles (Official Charts)	73
UK Indie (Official Charts)	1
US Billboard Hot 100	91
US Hot Rock & Alternative Songs (Billboard)	10

=== Year-end charts ===
Year-end chart performance for "Let Down"
Chart (2025)	Position
US Hot Rock & Alternative Songs (Billboard)	24

== Certifications ==
Certifications and sales for "Let Down"
Region	Certification	Certified units/sales
New Zealand (RMNZ)	Gold	15,000^{‡}
Spain (Promusicae)	Gold	50,000^{‡}
United Kingdom (BPI)	Silver	200,000^{‡}
^{‡} Sales+streaming figures based on certification alone.

== Bibliography ==
- Ehmann, Julia (2020). Radiohead and the Journey Beyond Genre: Analysing Stylistic Debates and Transgressions. Abingdon: Routledge. ISBN 978-1-138-33474-8.
- Footman, Tim (2007). Welcome to the Machine: OK Computer and the Death of the Classic Album. New Malden: Chrome Dreams. ISBN 978-1-84240-388-4.
- Randall, Mac (2000). Exit Music: The Radiohead Story. New York: Delta Trade Paperbacks. ISBN 0-385-33393-5.
