= Airbag / How Am I Driving? =

EP by Radiohead
- Released: 21 April 1998
- Recorded: 1996–1997
- Studios: Canned Applause (Didcot); St Catherine's Court (Bath)
- Genre: Alternative rock
- Length: 25:34
- Label: Capitol
- Producers: Nigel Godrich, Radiohead

Radiohead chronology
OK Computer (1997)	Airbag / How Am I Driving? (1998)	Kid A (2000)

Airbag / How Am I Driving? is an EP by the English rock band Radiohead, released in April 1998 in North America. It collects most of the B-sides from singles released from Radiohead's third album, OK Computer (1997), plus the OK Computer song "Airbag". It was nominated for the Grammy Award for Best Alternative Music Performance.

== Songs ==
Airbag / How Am I Driving? collects the OK Computer B-sides, excluding "Lull" (from the "Karma Police" single) and "How I Made My Millions" (from the "No Surprises" single). Only one had been previously released in North America.

"Meeting in the Aisle" is a "spaced out" instrumental with "orchestral" drones, drum machine and bass guitar. Radiohead did not perform it until 2012 on the King of Limbs tour. The two-part "Polyethylene" begins with softly strummed guitar before a climactic ending. "Palo Alto" features "hummable pop" verses and a "thunderous" chorus. Its initial title was "OK Computer" before this became the album title.

== Reception ==
Professional ratings
Review scores
Source	Rating
AllMusic	4/5 stars
Pitchfork	9.2/10

Airbag / How Am I Driving? debuted at number 56 on the Billboard 200, selling 20,000 copies in its first week. It was nominated for the Grammy Award for Best Alternative Music Performance.

In Pitchfork, Ryan Schreiber wrote that fans of OK Computer and its "anti-technology, self-loathing" themes would enjoy the EP. He expressed surprise that the "impossibly brilliant" final track, "Palo Alto", was not included on OK Computer and felt it would have made a strong single.

In 2016, Rolling Stone included "Palo Alto" on its list of "20 insanely great Radiohead songs only hardcore fans know". The Rolling Stone writer James Montgomery noted that the city Palo Alto later housed Facebook and Google, and wrote that the song was "very much about the oppressive emptiness of the wide-open tomorrow ... [Yorke] knew we were doomed."

== Track listing ==
All tracks are written by Thom Yorke, Jonny Greenwood, Philip Selway, Ed O'Brien and Colin Greenwood.

No.	Title	Length
1.	"Airbag"	4:46
2.	"Pearly*"	3:33
3.	"Meeting in the Aisle"	3:09
4.	"A Reminder"	3:51
5.	"Polyethylene (Parts 1 & 2)"	4:22
6.	"Melatonin"	2:09
7.	"Palo Alto"	3:43
Total length:		25:34

== Personnel ==
=== Radiohead ===
- Thom Yorke
- Jonny Greenwood
- Ed O'Brien
- Colin Greenwood
- Philip Selway

=== Production ===
- Nigel Godrich

=== Packaging ===
- Thom Yorke
- Stanley Donwood

== Certifications ==
Region	Certification	Certified units/sales
United Kingdom (BPI)	Silver	60,000^{‡}
^{‡} Sales+streaming figures based on certification alone.
