= Twill (magazine) =

Fashion magazine

- Editor: Fosco Bianchetti
- Categories: Fashion magazine
- Frequency: Quarterly
- Founded: 2002
- Based in: Paris
- Website: twill.info

Twill is a quarterly fashion magazine with an international readership. The magazine was started in 2002 and is published in Paris. It combines fashion spreads, often with erotic overtones, with articles on political and cultural subjects. The articles are published in their original language, without translation, the majority of which are English followed by Italian, French and Spanish.

Twill is a unique venture in publishing that some media have labeled an intellectual fashion magazine. The oxymoron is rather obvious and, in fact, Twill is not a fashion magazine.' The elegant photography and graphics of ‘Twill make it look like a fashion magazine, but its texts deal with serious subjects or interpret visual arts in a literary key, thus creating glossy storyboards rather than fashion editorials.

The magazine is edited by Fosco Bianchetti; notable past contributors include Daniel Dennett, Tim Footman, Eugenio Recuenco, and Ellen von Unwerth.

It is printed in a large format 23x33cm with circa 224 pages, on high quality paper, printing techniques including drip-off.
