= Subterranean Homesick Alien =

Song by Radiohead

from the album OK Computer
- Released: 27 May 1997
- Recorded: July 1996 – 6 March 1997
- Studio: St Catherine's Court, Bath, England
- Genre: Art rock; alternative rock; psychedelic rock
- Length: 4:27
- Label: Parlophone; Capitol
- Songwriters: Thom Yorke; Jonny Greenwood; Ed O'Brien; Colin Greenwood; Philip Selway
- Producers: Nigel Godrich; Radiohead

Licensed audio
- "Subterranean Homesick Alien" on YouTube

"Subterranean Homesick Alien" is a song by English rock band Radiohead from their third studio album OK Computer (1997). Its title references the Bob Dylan song "Subterranean Homesick Blues" from Dylan's fifth album Bringing It All Back Home (1965).

== Background ==
"Subterranean Homesick Alien" takes inspiration from several sources, the most prominent being a poem Thom Yorke wrote in college where he imagined himself as an alien observing humanity. Another idea for the song arose after Yorke hit a bird while driving home. It was originally a "folky" acoustic duo by Jonny Greenwood and Yorke titled "Uptight". Greenwood composed the intro, the chorus and the outro, Yorke composed the verses.

== Composition and lyrics ==
Radiohead used electric keyboards to emulate the sound used in Bitches Brew, a 1970 jazz album by Miles Davis. The New York Times mostly likens it to "Pharaoh's Dance" from Bitches Brew.

== Recording ==
The song's instrumentation features a guitar with effect pedals played by Jonny Greenwood and a Fender Rhodes piano played by Thom Yorke.

== Release and reception ==
"Subterranean Homesick Alien" was released on Radiohead's 1997 album OK Computer. When ranking Radiohead's 40 best songs for The Guardian, it was placed number 22, stating: "Plunged into a shimmering dreamscape, Yorke observes a fleet of aliens surveying humanity." and "Radiohead exist to petition for the second option; here, however, was sweet ambiguity". Marc Hogan ranked it number 17 in his ranking of every Radiohead song, writing "Yorke's man-who-fell-to-earth observations of 'uptight' life on the third planet does justice to the title's nod to Dylan — one of the few artists whose music thrives more on inscrutability than Radiohead's". In Consequence of Sound's ranking of every Radiohead song, it was ranked 37, Nina Carcoran wrote the track's commentary, writing that it "drips each of its notes like a spoonful of honey, letting guitar lines and keys backstroke through an ocean of reverb in a beautiful ode to outer space and the ever-present feelings of nostalgia and longing". Author Dai Griffiths stated it "'fucked with' in solidly earnest, industrial-music fashion. On the other hand, there’s a tendency – Alanis Morissette was the first, so far as I know — for female singers to perform the slower, 'torch songs' faithfully."

== Sources ==
- Footman, Tim (2007). Welcome to the Machine: OK Computer and the Death of the Classic Album. New Malden: Chrome Dreams. ISBN 978-1-84240-388-4.
- Griffiths, Dai (2004). OK Computer. 33⅓ series. New York: Continuum International Publishing Group. ISBN 0-8264-1663-2.
