= OK Computer =

Studio album by Radiohead
- Released: 21 May 1997
- Recorded: 4 September 1995 ("Lucky"); July 1996 – 6 March 1997
- Studios: Canned Applause (Didcot, England); St Catherine's Court (Bath, England); The Church (Crouch End, London)
- Genres: Alternative rock; art rock; post-Britpop
- Length: 53:21
- Labels: Parlophone; Capitol
- Producers: Nigel Godrich; Radiohead

Radiohead chronology
| The Bends (1995) | OK Computer (1997) | Airbag / How Am I Driving? (1998) |

Singles from OK Computer
- 1. "Paranoid Android" Released: 26 May 1997; 2. "Karma Police" Released: 25 August 1997; 3. "Lucky" Released: 26 December 1997 (FR); 4. "No Surprises" Released: 12 January 1998

OK Computer is the third studio album by the English rock band Radiohead, released on 21 May 1997. With their producer, Nigel Godrich, Radiohead recorded most of OK Computer in their rehearsal space in Oxfordshire and the historic mansion of St Catherine's Court in Bath in 1996 and early 1997. They distanced themselves from the guitar-centred and lyrically introspective style of their previous album, The Bends. OK Computer's abstract lyrics, densely layered sound and eclectic influences laid the groundwork for Radiohead's later, more experimental work.

The lyrics depict a dystopian world fraught with rampant consumerism, social alienation, technological anxiety and political corruption, while also exploring themes of transport, conformity, paranoia, death, modern British life and globalisation. In this capacity, OK Computer is said to have prescient insight into the mood of 21st-century life. Radiohead used unconventional production techniques, including natural reverberation, and used few overdubs. Strings were recorded at Abbey Road Studios in London.

EMI had low expectations of OK Computer, deeming it uncommercial and difficult to market. However, it reached number one on the UK Albums Chart and debuted at number 21 on the Billboard 200, Radiohead's highest album entry on the US charts at the time, and was certified five-times platinum in the UK and double platinum in the US. It expanded Radiohead's international popularity and sold at least 7.8 million copies worldwide. "Paranoid Android", "Karma Police", "Lucky" and "No Surprises" were released as singles.

OK Computer received acclaim and has been cited as one of the greatest albums. At the 1998 Grammy Awards, it was nominated for Album of the Year and won Best Alternative Music Album. It was also nominated for Best British Album at the 1998 Brit Awards. The album initiated a shift in British rock away from Britpop toward melancholic, atmospheric alternative rock and post-Britpop that became more prevalent in the next decade. In 2014, it was added by the US Library of Congress to the National Recording Registry as "culturally, historically, or aesthetically significant". In 2026, it was inducted into the Grammy Hall of Fame. A remastered version with additional tracks, OKNOTOK 1997 2017, was released in 2017. In 2019, in response to an internet leak, Radiohead released MiniDiscs [Hacked], comprising hours of additional material.

== Background ==
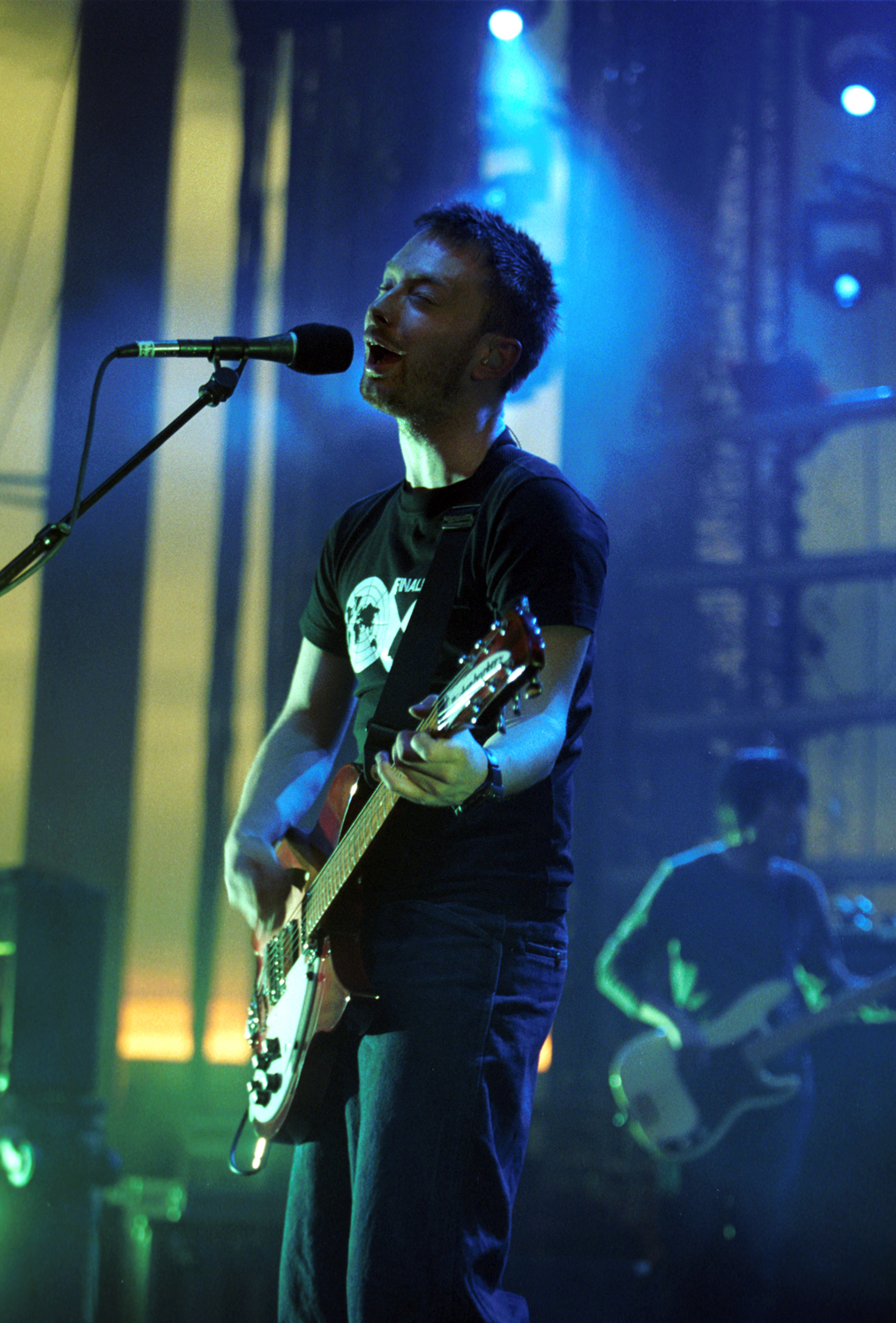
Thom Yorke in 2001

In 1995, Radiohead toured in support of their second album, The Bends (1995). Midway through the tour, Brian Eno commissioned them to contribute a song to The Help Album, a charity compilation organised by War Child; the album was to be recorded over the course of a single day, 4 September 1995, and rush-released that week. Radiohead recorded "Lucky" in five hours with Nigel Godrich, who had engineered The Bends and produced several Radiohead B-sides. Godrich said of the session: "Those things are the most inspiring, when you do stuff really fast and there's nothing to lose. We left feeling fairly euphoric. So after establishing a bit of a rapport work-wise, I was sort of hoping I would be involved with the next album." The singer, Thom Yorke, said "Lucky" shaped the nascent sound and mood of their upcoming record: "'Lucky' was indicative of what we wanted to do. It was like the first mark on the wall."

Radiohead found touring stressful and took a break in January 1996. They sought to move away from the introspective style of The Bends. The drummer, Philip Selway, said: "There was an awful lot of soul-searching [on The Bends]. To do that again on another album would be excruciatingly boring." Yorke said he did not want to do "another miserable, morbid and negative record", and was "writing down all the positive things that I hear or see. I'm not able to put them into music yet and I don't want to just force it."

The critical and commercial success of The Bends gave Radiohead the confidence to self-produce their third album. Their label, Parlophone, gave them a £100,000 budget for recording equipment. The lead guitarist, Jonny Greenwood, said "the only concept that we had for this album was that we wanted to record it away from the city and that we wanted to record it ourselves". According to the guitarist Ed O'Brien, "Everyone said, 'You'll sell six or seven million if you bring out The Bends Pt 2,' and we're like, 'We'll kick against that and do the opposite'." A number of producers were suggested, including major figures such as Scott Litt, but Radiohead were encouraged by their sessions with Godrich. They consulted him for advice on equipment, and prepared for the sessions by buying their own, including a plate reverberator purchased from the songwriter Jona Lewie. Although Godrich had sought to focus on electronic dance music, he outgrew his role as advisor and became the album's co-producer.

== Recording ==
In early 1996, Radiohead recorded demos at Chipping Norton Recording Studios, Oxfordshire. In July, they began rehearsing and recording in their Canned Applause studio, a converted shed near Didcot, Oxfordshire. Even without the deadline that contributed to the stress of The Bends, the band had difficulties, which Selway blamed on their choice to self-produce: "We're jumping from song to song, and when we started to run out of ideas, we'd move on to a new song ... The stupid thing was that we were nearly finished when we'd move on, because so much work had gone into them."

The members worked with nearly equal roles in the production and formation of the music, though Yorke was still firmly "the loudest voice", according to O'Brien. Selway said, "We give each other an awful lot of space to develop our parts, but at the same time we are all very critical about what the other person is doing." Godrich's role as co-producer was part collaborator and part managerial outsider. He said that Radiohead "need to have another person outside their unit, especially when they're all playing together, to say when the take goes well ... I take up slack when people aren't taking responsibility—the term 'producing a record' means taking responsibility for the record ... It's my job to ensure that they get the ideas across." Godrich has produced every Radiohead album since, and has been characterised as Radiohead's "sixth member", an allusion to George Martin's nickname as the "fifth Beatle".

Radiohead decided that Canned Applause was an unsatisfactory recording location, which Yorke attributed to its proximity to the band members' homes, and Jonny Greenwood attributed to its lack of dining and bathroom facilities. They had nearly completed "Electioneering", "No Surprises", "Subterranean Homesick Alien" and "The Tourist". They took a break from recording to tour America in 1996, opening for Alanis Morissette, performing early versions of several new songs. Greenwood said his main memory of the tour was of "playing interminable Hammond organ solos to an audience full of quietly despairing teenage girls".

During the tour, Baz Luhrmann commissioned Radiohead to write a song for his upcoming film Romeo + Juliet and gave them the final 30 minutes of the film. Yorke said: "When we saw the scene in which Claire Danes holds the Colt .45 against her head, we started working on the song immediately." Soon afterwards, Radiohead wrote and recorded "Exit Music (For a Film)", which plays over the film's end credits but was excluded from the soundtrack album at their request. The song helped shape the direction of OK Computer. Yorke said it "was the first performance we'd ever recorded where every note of it made my head spin—something I was proud of, something I could turn up really, really loud and not wince at any moment".

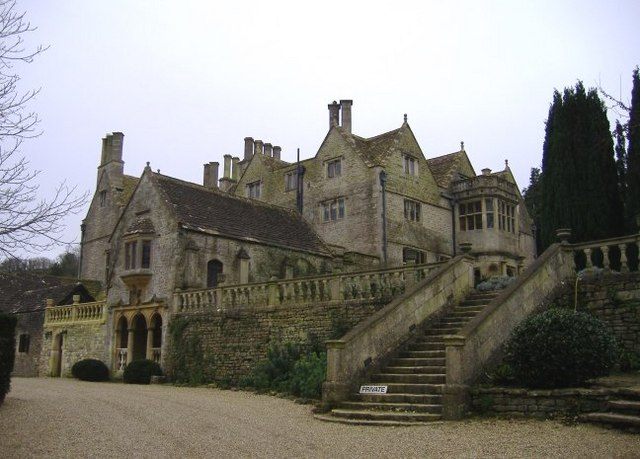
Most of OK Computer was recorded between September and October 1996 at St Catherine's Court, a rural mansion near Bath, Somerset.

Radiohead resumed recording in September 1996 at St Catherine's Court, a historic mansion near Bath owned by the actress Jane Seymour. It was unoccupied but sometimes used for corporate functions. The change of setting marked an important transition in the recording process. Greenwood said it "was less like a laboratory experiment, which is what being in a studio is usually like, and more about a group of people making their first record together".

The band made extensive use of the different rooms and acoustics in the house. The vocals on "Exit Music (For a Film)" feature natural reverberation achieved by recording on a stone staircase, and "Let Down" was recorded in a ballroom at 3 am. Isolation allowed the band to work at a different pace, with more flexible and spontaneous working hours. O'Brien said that "the biggest pressure was actually completing [the recording]. We weren't given any deadlines and we had complete freedom to do what we wanted. We were delaying it because we were a bit frightened of actually finishing stuff."

Yorke was satisfied with the recordings made at the house, and enjoyed working with little overdubbing, meaning that instruments were not recorded separately. O'Brien estimated that 80 per cent of the album was recorded live, and said: "I hate doing overdubs, because it just doesn't feel natural. ... Something special happens when you're playing live; a lot of it is just looking at one another and knowing there are four other people making it happen." Many of Yorke's vocals were first takes; he felt that if he made other attempts he would "start to think about it and it would sound really lame".

Radiohead returned to Canned Applause in October for rehearsals, and completed most of OK Computer in further sessions at St. Catherine's Court. By Christmas, they had narrowed the track listing to 14 songs. Additional recording took place at the Church in Crouch End, London. The strings were recorded at Abbey Road Studios in London in January 1997. Godrich mixed OK Computer at various London studios. He preferred a quick and "hands-off" approach to mixing, and said: "I feel like I get too into it. I start fiddling with things and I fuck it up ... I generally take about half a day to do a mix. If it's any longer than that, you lose it. The hardest thing is trying to stay fresh, to stay objective." OK Computer was mastered by Chris Blair at Abbey Road and completed on 6 March 1997.

== Music and lyrics ==
=== Style and influences ===
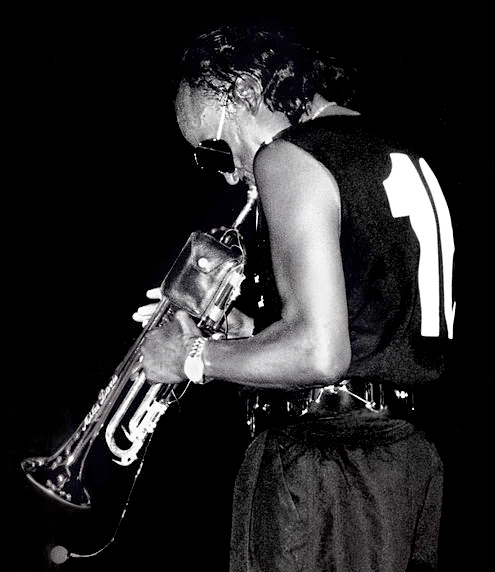
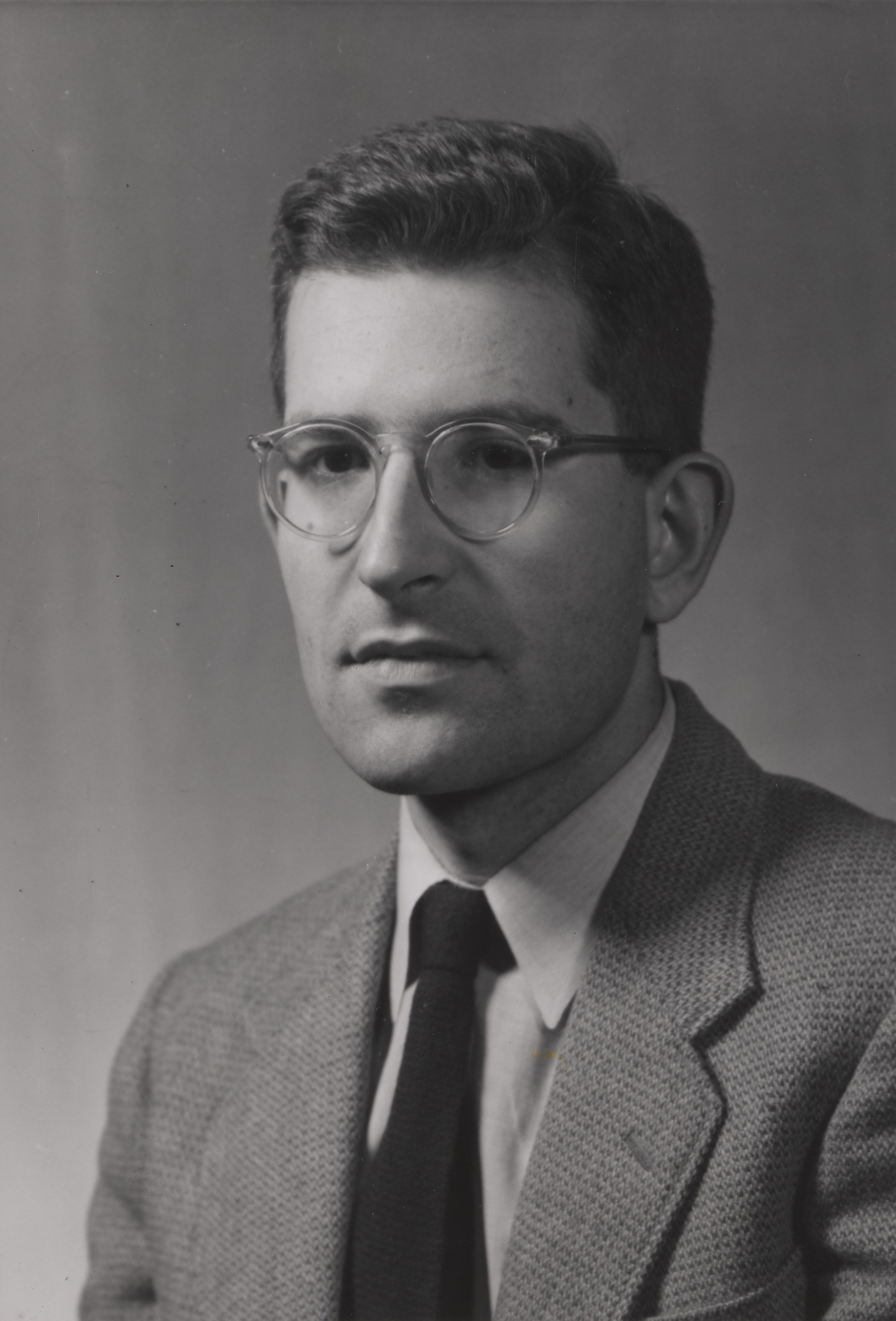
The jazz fusion of Miles Davis (top, 1986) and political writings of Noam Chomsky (bottom, 1961) influenced OK Computer.

Yorke said Radiohead's starting point was the "incredibly dense and terrifying sound" of Bitches Brew, the 1970 avant-garde jazz fusion album by Miles Davis. He said: "It was building something up and watching it fall apart, that's the beauty of it. It was at the core of what we were trying to do with OK Computer." Yorke identified "I'll Wear It Proudly" by Elvis Costello, "Fall on Me" by R.E.M., "Dress" by PJ Harvey and "A Day in the Life" by the Beatles as particularly influential. Radiohead drew further inspiration from the film soundtrack composer Ennio Morricone and the krautrock band Can, musicians Yorke described as "abusing the recording process". Jonny Greenwood described OK Computer as a product of being "in love with all these brilliant records ... trying to recreate them, and missing".

According to Yorke, Radiohead hoped to achieve an "atmosphere that's perhaps a bit shocking when you first hear it, but only as shocking as the atmosphere on the Beach Boys' Pet Sounds". They extended their instrumentation to include electric piano, Mellotron and glockenspiel. Jonny Greenwood summarised the exploratory approach as "when we've got what we suspect to be an amazing song, but nobody knows what they're gonna play on it". Spin said OK Computer sounded like "a DIY electronica album made with guitars".

Critics suggested a stylistic debt to 1970s progressive rock, an influence Radiohead disavowed. According to Andy Greene in Rolling Stone, Radiohead "were collectively hostile to seventies progressive rock ... but that didn't stop them from reinventing prog from scratch on OK Computer, particularly on the six-and-a-half-minute 'Paranoid Android'." Tom Hull believed the album was "still prog, but may just be because rock has so thoroughly enveloped musical storytelling that this sort of thing has become inevitable". Writing in 2017, The New Yorker's Kelefa Sanneh said OK Computer "was profoundly prog: grand and dystopian, with a lead single that was more than six minutes long".

=== Lyrics ===
The lyrics, written by Yorke, are more abstract compared to his personal, emotional lyrics for The Bends. Critic Alex Ross said the lyrics "seemed a mixture of overheard conversations, techno-speak, and fragments of a harsh diary" with "images of riot police at political rallies, anguished lives in tidy suburbs, yuppies freaking out, sympathetic aliens gliding overhead." Themes include transport, technology, insanity, death, modern British life, globalisation and anti-capitalism. Yorke said: "On this album, the outside world became all there was ... I'm just taking Polaroids of things around me moving too fast." He told Q: "It was like there's a secret camera in a room and it's watching the character who walks in—a different character for each song. The camera's not quite me. It's neutral, emotionless. But not emotionless at all. In fact, the very opposite." Yorke also drew inspiration from books, including Noam Chomsky's political writing, Eric Hobsbawm's The Age of Extremes, Will Hutton's The State We're In, Jonathan Coe's What a Carve Up! and Philip K. Dick's VALIS.

The songs of OK Computer do not have a coherent narrative, and the lyrics are generally considered abstract or oblique. Nonetheless, many critics, journalists, and scholars consider it a concept album or song cycle, noting its strong thematic cohesion, aesthetic unity, and the structural logic of the sequencing. (Note: Conversely, other critics have also argued that OK Computer is a concept album only in part, or in a nontraditional or qualified sense, or is not a concept album at all. See Letts 2010, pp. 28–32) Although the songs share common themes, Radiohead said they did not intend to link them through a narrative and do not consider OK Computer a concept album. Jonny Greenwood said: "I think one album title and one computer voice do not make a concept album. That's a bit of a red herring." However, they intended the album to be heard as a whole, and spent two weeks ordering the track list. O'Brien said: "The context of each song is really important ... It's not a concept album but there is a continuity there."

=== Composition ===
==== Tracks 1–6 ====
"Airbag"
"Airbag" features sparse bass and a programmed drum beat influenced by the music of DJ Shadow. This audio sample contains a portion of the song's first verse.

"Paranoid Android"
"Paranoid Android", Radiohead's second-longest song, has a multi-section structure. This audio sample is from the middle of the second section to the beginning of the first guitar solo.

The opening track, "Airbag", is underpinned by a beat built from a seconds-long recording of Selway's drumming. The band sampled the drum track with a sampler and edited it with a Macintosh computer, inspired by the music of DJ Shadow, but admitted to making approximations in emulating Shadow's style due to their programming inexperience. The bassline stops and starts unexpectedly, achieving an effect similar to 1970s dub. The references to automobile crashes and reincarnation were inspired by a magazine article titled "An Airbag Saved My Life" and The Tibetan Book of the Dead. Yorke wrote "Airbag" about the illusion of safety offered by modern transit, and "the idea that whenever you go out on the road you could be killed". The BBC wrote about the influence of J. G. Ballard, especially his 1973 novel Crash, on the lyrics. Music journalist Tim Footman noted that the song's technical innovations and lyrical concerns demonstrated the "key paradox" of the album: "The musicians and producer are delighting in the sonic possibilities of modern technology; the singer, meanwhile, is railing against its social, moral, and psychological impact ... It's a contradiction mirrored in the culture clash of the music, with the 'real' guitars negotiating an uneasy stand-off with the hacked-up, processed drums."

Split into four sections with an overall running time of 6:23, "Paranoid Android" is among the band's longest songs. The unconventional structure was inspired by the Beatles' "Happiness Is a Warm Gun" and Queen's "Bohemian Rhapsody", which also eschew a traditional verse-chorus-verse structure. Its musical style was also inspired by the music of the Pixies. The song was written by Yorke after an unpleasant night at a Los Angeles bar, where he saw a woman react violently after someone spilled a drink on her. Its title and lyrics are a reference to Marvin the Paranoid Android from Douglas Adams's The Hitchhiker's Guide to the Galaxy series.

The use of electric keyboards in "Subterranean Homesick Alien" is an example of Radiohead's attempts to emulate the atmosphere of Bitches Brew. Its title references the Bob Dylan song "Subterranean Homesick Blues", and the lyrics describe an isolated narrator who fantasises about being abducted by extraterrestrials. The narrator speculates that, upon returning to Earth, his friends would not believe his story and he would remain a misfit. The lyrics were inspired by an assignment from Yorke's time at Abingdon School to write a piece of "Martian poetry", a British literary movement that humorously recontextualises mundane aspects of human life from an alien perspective.

William Shakespeare's Romeo and Juliet inspired the lyrics for "Exit Music (For a Film)". Initially Yorke wanted to work lines from the play into the song, but the final draft of the lyrics became a broad summary of the narrative. He said: "I saw the Zeffirelli version when I was 13 and I cried my eyes out, because I couldn't understand why, the morning after they shagged, they didn't just run away. It's a song for two people who should run away before all the bad stuff starts." Yorke compared the opening of the song, which mostly features his singing paired with acoustic guitar, to Johnny Cash's At Folsom Prison. Mellotron choir and other electronic voices are used throughout the track. The song climaxes with the entrance of drums and distorted bass run through a fuzz pedal. The climactic portion of the song is an attempt to emulate the sound of trip hop group Portishead, but in a style that the bassist, Colin Greenwood, called more "stilted and leaden and mechanical". The song concludes by fading back to Yorke's voice, acoustic guitar and Mellotron.

"Let Down" contains multilayered arpeggiated guitars and electric piano. Jonny Greenwood plays his guitar part in a different time signature to the other instruments. O'Brien said the song was influenced by Phil Spector, a producer and songwriter best known for his reverberating "Wall of Sound" recording techniques. The lyrics, Yorke said, are about a fear of being trapped, and "about that feeling that you get when you're in transit but you're not in control of it—you just go past thousands of places and thousands of people and you're completely removed from it". Of the line "Don't get sentimental / It always ends up drivel", Yorke said: "Sentimentality is being emotional for the sake of it. We're bombarded with sentiment, people emoting. That's the Let Down. Feeling every emotion is fake. Or rather every emotion is on the same plane whether it's a car advert or a pop song." Yorke felt that scepticism of emotion was characteristic of Generation X and that it had informed the band's approach to the album.

"Karma Police" has two main verses that alternate with a subdued break, followed by a different ending section. The verses centre around acoustic guitar and piano, with a chord progression indebted to the Beatles' "Sexy Sadie". Starting at 2:34, the song transitions into an orchestrated section with the repeated line "For a minute there, I lost myself". It ends with feedback generated with a delay effect. The title and lyrics to "Karma Police" originate from an in-joke during The Bends tour; Jonny Greenwood said "whenever someone was behaving in a particularly shitty way, we'd say 'The karma police will catch up with him sooner or later.'"

==== Tracks 7–12 ====
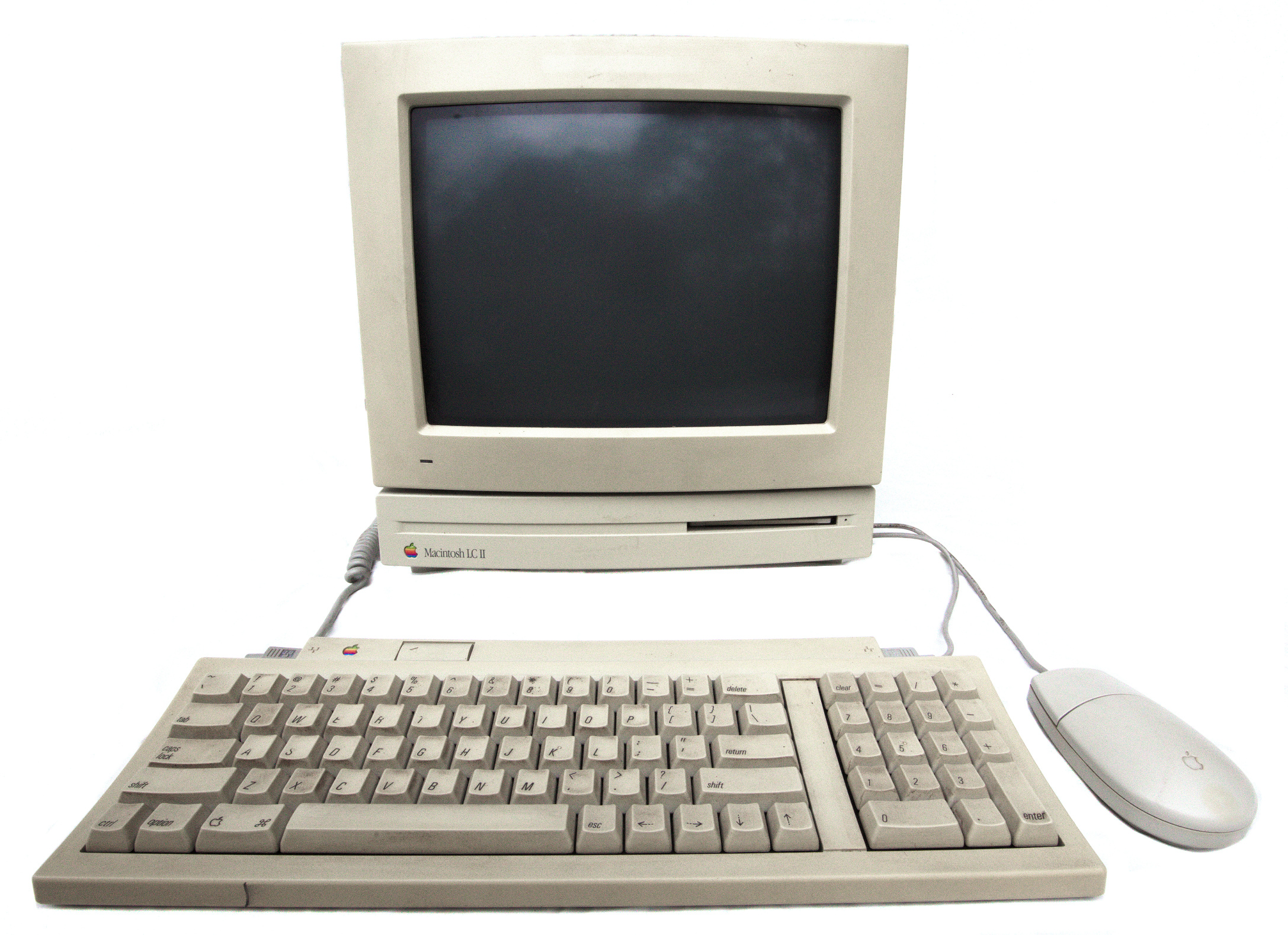
A 1990s Macintosh LC II system. Radiohead used the synthesised voice of "Fred", included with older Macintosh software, to recite the lyrics of "Fitter Happier".

"Fitter Happier" is a short musique concrète track that consists of sampled musical and background sound and spoken-word lyrics recited by "Fred", a synthesised voice from the Macintosh SimpleText application. Yorke wrote the lyrics "in ten minutes" after a period of writer's block while the rest of the band were playing. He described the words as a checklist of slogans for the 1990s; he considered it "the most upsetting thing I've ever written", and said it was "liberating" to give the words to a neutral-sounding computer voice. Among the samples in the background is a loop from the 1975 film Three Days of the Condor. The band considered using "Fitter Happier" as the album's opening track, but decided the effect was off-putting.

Steve Lowe called the song "penetrating surgery on pseudo-meaningful corporations' lifestyles" with "a repugnance for prevailing yuppified social values". Among the loosely connected imagery of the lyrics, Footman identified the song's subject as "the materially comfortable, morally empty embodiment of modern, Western humanity, half-salaryman, half-Stepford Wife, destined for the metaphorical farrowing crate, propped up on Prozac, Viagra and anything else his insurance plan can cover." Sam Steele called the lyrics "a stream of received imagery: scraps of media information, interspersed with lifestyle ad slogans and private prayers for a healthier existence. It is the hum of a world buzzing with words, one of the messages seeming to be that we live in such a synthetic universe we have grown unable to detect reality from artifice."

"Electioneering", featuring a cowbell and a distorted guitar solo, is the album's most rock-oriented track and one of the heaviest songs Radiohead has recorded. It has been compared to Radiohead's earlier style on Pablo Honey. The cynical "Electioneering" is the album's most directly political song, with lyrics inspired by the poll tax riots. The song was also inspired by Chomsky's Manufacturing Consent, a book analysing contemporary mass media under the propaganda model. Yorke likened its lyrics, which focus on political and artistic compromise, to "a preacher ranting in front of a bank of microphones". Regarding its oblique political references, Yorke said, "What can you say about the IMF, or politicians? Or people selling arms to African countries, employing slave labour or whatever. What can you say? You just write down 'Cattle prods and the IMF' and people who know, know." O'Brien said the song was about the promotional cycle of touring: "After a while you feel like a politician who has to kiss babies and shake hands all day long."

'Climbing Up the Walls'
"Climbing Up the Walls" contains sampled ambient sounds, distorted drums and Jonny Greenwood's Krzysztof Penderecki-influenced string section. This audio sample is from the beginning of the second chorus to the guitar solo.

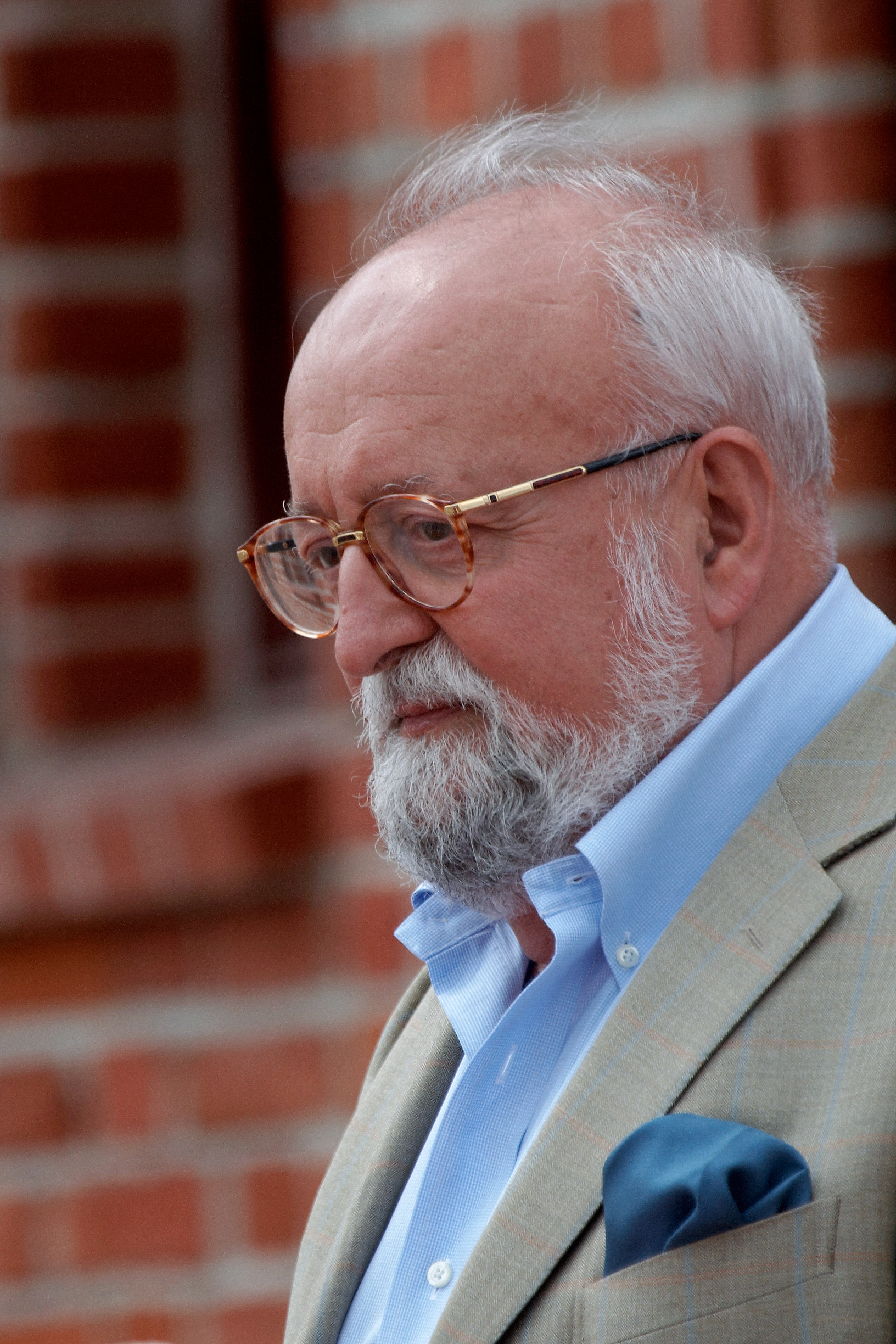
Threnody to the Victims of Hiroshima by Krzysztof Penderecki (pictured) inspired the string arrangement on "Climbing Up the Walls".

"Climbing Up the Walls" – described by Melody Maker as "monumental chaos" – is layered with a string section, ambient noise and repetitive, metallic percussion. The string section, composed by Jonny Greenwood and written for 16 instruments, was inspired by modern classical composer Krzysztof Penderecki's Threnody to the Victims of Hiroshima. Greenwood said, "I got very excited at the prospect of doing string parts that didn't sound like 'Eleanor Rigby', which is what all string parts have sounded like for the past 30 years." Select described Yorke's distraught vocals and the atonal strings as "Thom's voice dissolving into a fearful, blood-clotted scream as Jonny whips the sound of a million dying elephants into a crescendo". For the lyrics, Yorke drew from his time as an orderly in a mental hospital during the Care in the Community policy of deinstitutionalising mental health patients, and a New York Times article about serial killers. He said:

This is about the unspeakable. Literally skull-crushing. I used to work in a mental hospital around the time that Care in the Community started, and we all just knew what was going to happen. And it's one of the scariest things to happen in this country, because a lot of them weren't just harmless ... It was hailing violently when we recorded this. It seemed to add to the mood.

"No Surprises", recorded in a single take, is arranged with electric guitar (inspired by the Beach Boys' "Wouldn't It Be Nice"), acoustic guitar, glockenspiel and vocal harmonies. The band strove to replicate the mood of Louis Armstrong's 1968 recording of "What a Wonderful World" and the soul music of Marvin Gaye. Yorke identified the subject of the song as "someone who's trying hard to keep it together but can't". The lyrics seem to portray a suicide or an unfulfilling life, and dissatisfaction with contemporary social and political order. Some lines refer to rural or suburban imagery. One of the key metaphors in the song is the opening line, "a heart that's full up like a landfill"; according to Yorke, the song is a "fucked-up nursery rhyme" that "stems from my unhealthy obsession of what to do with plastic boxes and plastic bottles ... All this stuff is getting buried, the debris of our lives. It doesn't rot, it just stays there. That's how we deal, that's how I deal with stuff, I bury it." The song's gentle mood contrasts sharply with its harsh lyrics; Steele said, "even when the subject is suicide ... O'Brien's guitar is as soothing as balm on a red-raw psyche, the song rendered like a bittersweet child's prayer."

"Lucky" was inspired by the Bosnian War. Sam Taylor said it was "the one track on [The Help Album] to capture the sombre terror of the conflict", and that its serious subject matter and dark tone made the band "too 'real' to be allowed on the Britpop gravy train". The lyrics were pared down from many pages of notes, and were originally more politically explicit. The lyrics depict a man surviving an aeroplane crash and are drawn from Yorke's anxiety about transportation. The musical centerpiece of "Lucky" is its three-piece guitar arrangement, which grew out of the high-pitched chiming sound played by O'Brien in the song's introduction, achieved by strumming above the guitar nut. Critics likened its lead guitar to Pink Floyd and, more broadly, arena rock.

The album ends with "The Tourist", which Jonny Greenwood wrote as an unusually staid piece where something "doesn't have to happen ... every three seconds". He said, "'The Tourist' doesn't sound like Radiohead at all. It has become a song with space." The lyrics, written by Yorke, were inspired by his experience of watching American tourists in France frantically trying to see as many tourist attractions as possible. He said it was chosen as the closing track because "a lot of the album was about background noise and everything moving too fast and not being able to keep up. It was really obvious to have 'Tourist' as the last song. That song was written to me from me, saying, 'Idiot, slow down.' Because at that point, I needed to. So that was the only resolution there could be: to slow down." The "unexpectedly bluesy waltz" draws to a close as the guitars drop out, leaving only drums and bass, and concludes with the sound of a small bell.

== Title ==
The title OK Computer is taken from the 1978 radio series Hitchhiker's Guide to the Galaxy, in which the character Zaphod Beeblebrox speaks the phrase "Okay, computer, I want full manual control now." The members of Radiohead listened to the series on the bus during their 1996 tour and Yorke made a note of the phrase. "OK Computer" was initially a working title for the B-side "Palo Alto". The title stuck with the band; according to Jonny Greenwood, it "started attaching itself and creating all these weird resonances with what we were trying to do".

Yorke said the title "refers to embracing the future, it refers to being terrified of the future, of our future, of everyone else's. It's to do with standing in a room where all these appliances are going off and all these machines and computers and so on ... and the sound it makes." He described the title as "a really resigned, terrified phrase", to him similar to the Coca-Cola advertisement "I'd Like to Teach the World to Sing". Wired writer Leander Kahney suggests that it is an homage to Macintosh computers, as the Mac's speech recognition software responds to the command "OK computer" as an alternative to clicking the "OK" button. Other titles considered were Ones and Zeroes—a reference to the binary numeral system—and Your Home May Be at Risk If You Do Not Keep Up Payments.

== Artwork ==
A page of the OK Computer booklet with logos, white scribbles and text in Esperanto and English. Yorke said the motif of two stick figures shaking hands symbolised exploitation.

The OK Computer artwork is a collage of images and text created by Yorke (credited as the White Chocolate Farm) and Stanley Donwood. Yorke commissioned Donwood to work on a visual diary alongside the recording sessions. He said he did not feel confident in his music until he saw a visual representation to accompany it. According to Donwood, the blue-and-white palette was the result of "trying to make something the colour of bleached bone".

The image of two stick figures shaking hands appears in the liner notes and on the disc label in CD and LP releases. Yorke said the image symbolised exploitation: "Someone's being sold something they don't really want, and someone's being friendly because they're trying to sell something. That's what it means to me." The image was later used on the cover for Radiohead: The Best Of (2008). Explaining the artwork's themes, Yorke said, "It's quite sad, and quite funny as well. All the artwork and so on ... It was all the things that I hadn't said in the songs."

Motifs in the artwork include motorways, aeroplanes, families, corporate logos and cityscapes. The photograph of a motorway on the cover is of the interchange between Interstate 84 and Interstate 91 in Hartford, Connecticut, where Radiohead performed in 1996. The words "Lost Child" feature prominently, and the booklet artwork contains phrases in the constructed language Esperanto and health-related instructions in both English and Greek. The Uncut critic David Cavanagh said the use of non-sequiturs created an effect "akin to being lifestyle-coached by a lunatic". White scribbles, Donwood's method of correcting mistakes rather than using the computer function undo, are present everywhere in the collages.

The liner notes contain the full lyrics, rendered with atypical syntax, alternate spelling and small annotations. (Note: For example, the line "in a deep deep sleep of the innocent" from "Airbag" is rendered as ">in a deep deep sssleep of tHe inno$ent/~~completely terrified~~". See Footman 2007, p. 45) The lyrics are also arranged and spaced in shapes that resemble hidden images. In keeping with Radiohead's emerging anti-corporate stance, the production credits contain the ironic copyright notice "Lyrics reproduced by kind permission even though we wrote them."

== Release and promotion ==
=== Commercial expectations ===
According to Selway, Radiohead's American label Capitol saw the album as "'commercial suicide'. They weren't really into it. At that point, we got the fear. How is this going to be received?" Yorke recalled: "When we first gave it to Capitol, they were taken aback. I don't really know why it's so important now, but I'm excited about it." Capitol lowered its sales forecast from two million to half a million. In O'Brien's view, only Parlophone, the band's British label, remained optimistic, while global distributors dramatically reduced their sales estimates. Label representatives were reportedly disappointed with the lack of marketable songs, especially the absence of anything resembling Radiohead's 1992 hit "Creep". "OK Computer isn't the album we're going to rule the world with", Colin Greenwood predicted at the time. "It's not as hitting-everything-loudly-whilst-waggling-the-tongue-in-and-out, like The Bends. There's less of the Van Halen factor."

=== Marketing ===
Colin Greenwood, Jonny Greenwood, Ed O'Brien, and Phil Selway discussing OK Computer in 1997

The lyrics to "Fitter Happier" and images adapted from the album artwork were used on advertisements in music magazines, signs in the London Underground and shirts (shirt design pictured).

Parlophone launched an unorthodox advertising campaign, taking full-page advertisements in high-profile British newspapers and tube stations with lyrics for "Fitter Happier" in large black letters against white backgrounds. The same lyrics, and artwork adapted from the album, were repurposed for shirt designs. Yorke said they chose the "Fitter Happier" lyrics to link what a critic called "a coherent set of concerns" between the album artwork and its promotional material.

Other unconventional merchandise included a floppy disk containing Radiohead screensavers and an FM radio in the shape of a desktop computer. In America, Capitol sent 1,000 cassette players to prominent members of the press and music industry, each with a copy of the album permanently glued inside. Gary Gersh, Capitol's president, said: "Our job is just to take them as a left-of-centre band and bring the centre to them. That's our focus, and we won't let up until they're the biggest band in the world."

Radiohead planned to produce a video for every song on the album, but the project was abandoned due to financial and time constraints. According to Grant Gee, the director of the "No Surprises" video, the plan was cancelled when the videos for "Paranoid Android" and "Karma Police" went over budget. Also cancelled were plans for the trip hop group Massive Attack to remix the album.

Radiohead's website was created to promote the album, which went live at the time of its release, making the band one of the first to manage an online presence. The first major Radiohead fansite, Atease, was created shortly following the album's release, with its title taken from "Fitter Happier". In 2017, for OK Computer's 20th anniversary, Radiohead temporarily restored their website to its 1997 state.

=== Singles ===
Radiohead chose "Paranoid Android" as the lead single, despite its unusually long running time and lack of a catchy chorus. Colin Greenwood said the song was "hardly the radio-friendly, breakthrough, buzz bin unit shifter [radio stations] can have been expecting", but that Capitol supported the choice. The song premiered on the Radio 1 programme The Evening Session in April 1997 and was released as a single in May 1997. On the strength of frequent radio play on Radio 1 and rotation of the song's music video on MTV, "Paranoid Android" reached number three in the UK, giving Radiohead their highest chart position.

"Karma Police" was released in August 1997 and "No Surprises" in January 1998. Both singles charted in the UK top ten, and "Karma Police" peaked at number 14 on the Billboard Modern Rock Tracks chart. "Lucky" was released as a single in France, but did not chart. "Let Down", considered for release as the lead single, was issued as a promotional single in September 1997 and charted on the Modern Rock Tracks chart at number 29. In 2025, after it became popular on the social media platform TikTok, "Let Down" became Radiohead's first entry on the Billboard Hot 100 since their 2008 single "Nude".

=== Tour ===
Radiohead embarked on the "Against Demons" world tour in promotion of OK Computer, commencing at the album launch in Barcelona on 22 May 1997. They toured the UK and Ireland, continental Europe, North America, Japan and Australasia, concluding on 18 April 1998 in New York. A documentary by Grant Gee following Radiohead on the tour, Meeting People Is Easy, premiered in November 1998.

The tour was taxing for the band, particularly Yorke, who said: "That tour was a year too long. I was the first person to tire of it, then six months later everyone in the band was saying it. Then six months after that, nobody was talking any more." In 2003, Colin Greenwood said the tour was the lowest point in Radiohead's career: "There is nothing worse than having to play in front of 20,000 people when someone—when Thom—absolutely does not want to be there, and you can see that hundred-yard stare in his eyes. You hate having to put your friend through that experience."

The tour included Radiohead's first headline performance at Glastonbury Festival on 28 June 1997. Despite technical problems that almost caused Yorke to abandon the stage, the performance was acclaimed and cemented Radiohead as a major live act. Rolling Stone described it as "an absolute triumph", and in 2004 Q named it the greatest concert of all time. In 2023, the Guardian named it the greatest Glastonbury headline set, writing that "frustration and tension led to the band playing out of their skins, adding a startling potency to a set that confirmed OK Computer as the defining sound of rock's post-Britpop shift".

=== Sales ===
OK Computer was released in Japan on 21 May, in the UK on 16 June, in Canada on 17 June and in the US on 1 July. It was released on CD, double-LP vinyl record, cassette and MiniDisc. It debuted at number one in the UK with sales of 136,000 copies in its first week. In the US, it debuted at number 21 on the Billboard 200. It held the number-one spot in the UK for two weeks and stayed in the top ten for several more, becoming the UK's eighth-bestselling record that year.

By February 1998, OK Computer had sold at least half a million copies in the UK and 2 million worldwide. By September 2000, it had sold 4.5 million copies worldwide. The Los Angeles Times reported that by June 2001 it had sold 1.4 million copies in the US, and in April 2006 the IFPI announced it had sold 3 million copies across Europe. In the UK, it was certified gold in June 1997, platinum in July, and five-times platinum in August 2013. It is certified double platinum in the US, in addition to certifications in other markets. By May 2016, Nielsen SoundScan figures showed OK Computer had sold 2.5 million digital album units in the US, plus 900,000 sales measured in album-equivalent units. Twenty years to the week after its release, the Official Charts Company recorded total UK sales of 1.5 million, including album-equivalent units. Tallying American and European sales, OK Computer has sold at least 6.9 million copies worldwide (or 7.8 million with album-equivalent units). (Note: The LA Times reported US sales of 1.4 million in 2001, before Nielsen SoundScan had begun tracking digital sales in 2003—therefore, this amount only included non-digital sales on CD, cassette, and LP. Forbes reported 2.5 million in digital sales and 900,000 in album-equivalent units in 2016, bringing the US total to at least 3.9 million (or 4.8 million with album-equivalent units). BBC News reported 3 million in sales across Europe in 2006, bringing the worldwide total to at least 6.9 million (or 7.8 million with album-equivalent units). Music Week reported that the album had sold 1.5 million units in the UK by 2017; however, the 2006 European sales figure included UK sales up to that time and, as such, adding the 2017 UK sales figure to the total would result in erroneous double counting of UK units sold before 2006. Exact sales figures from other territories are not known. OK Computer has certainly sold more than 7.8 million units worldwide, but it is impossible to say how many more with any certainty.)

== Critical reception ==
Contemporaneous reviews
Review scores
| Source | Rating |
|---|---|
| Chicago Tribune | 3.5/4 stars |
| Entertainment Weekly | B+ |
| The Guardian | 4/5 stars |
| Los Angeles Times | 3.5/4 stars |
| NME | 10/10 |
| Pitchfork | 10/10 |
| Q | 5/5 stars |
| Rolling Stone | 4/5 stars |
| Select | 5/5 |
| Spin | 8/10 |

OK Computer has been met with widespread acclaim. Critics described it as a landmark release of far-reaching impact and importance, but noted that its experimentalism made it a challenging listen. According to Tim Footman, "Not since 1967, with the release of Sgt. Pepper's Lonely Hearts Club Band, had so many major critics agreed immediately, not only on an album's merits, but on its long-term significance, and its ability to encapsulate a particular point in history." In the British press, the album garnered favourable reviews in NME, Melody Maker, The Guardian and Q. Nick Kent wrote in Mojo that "Others may end up selling more, but in 20 years' time I'm betting OK Computer will be seen as the key record of 1997, the one to take rock forward instead of artfully revamping images and song-structures from an earlier era." John Harris wrote in Select: "Every word sounds achingly sincere, every note spewed from the heart, and yet it roots itself firmly in a world of steel, glass, random-access memory and prickly-skinned paranoia."

The album was well received by critics in North America. Rolling Stone, Spin, the Los Angeles Times, the Pittsburgh Post-Gazette, Pitchfork and the Daily Herald published positive reviews. In The New Yorker, Alex Ross praised its progressiveness, and contrasted Radiohead's risk-taking with the musically conservative "dadrock" of their contemporaries Oasis. Ross wrote: "Throughout the album, contrasts of mood and style are extreme ... This band has pulled off one of the great art-pop balancing acts in the history of rock." Ryan Schreiber of Pitchfork lauded the record's emotional appeal, writing that it "is brimming with genuine emotion, beautiful and complex imagery and music, and lyrics that are at once passive and fire-breathing".

Reviews for Entertainment Weekly, the Chicago Tribune, and Time were mixed. Robert Christgau from The Village Voice said Radiohead immersed Yorke's vocals in "enough electronic marginal distinction to feed a coal town for a month" to compensate for the "soulless" songs, resulting in "arid" art rock. In an otherwise positive review, Andy Gill wrote for The Independent: "For all its ambition and determination to break new ground, OK Computer is not, finally, as impressive as The Bends, which covered much the same sort of emotional knots, but with better tunes. It is easy to be impressed by, but ultimately hard to love, an album that luxuriates so readily in its own despondency."

=== Accolades ===
OK Computer was nominated for Grammy Awards as Album of the Year and Best Alternative Music Album at the 40th Annual Grammy Awards in 1998, winning the latter. It was also nominated for Best British Album at the 1998 Brit Awards. The album was shortlisted for the 1997 Mercury Prize, a prestigious award recognising the best British or Irish album of the year. The day before the winner was announced, oddsmakers gave OK Computer the best chance to win among ten nominees, but it lost to New Forms by Roni Size/Reprazent.

OK Computer was named the best album of the year by Mojo, Vox, Entertainment Weekly, Hot Press, Muziekkrant OOR, HUMO, Eye Weekly and Inpress, and tied for first place with Daft Punk's Homework in The Face. It was named the second-best in NME, Melody Maker, Rolling Stone, Village Voice, Spin and Uncut. Q and Les Inrockuptibles listed the album in their year-end polls.

The praise overwhelmed the band. Jonny Greenwood felt it had been exaggerated because The Bends had been "under-reviewed possibly and under-received". Radiohead rejected links to progressive rock and art rock, despite comparisons to Pink Floyd's 1973 album The Dark Side of the Moon. Yorke responded: "We write pop songs ... There was no intention of it being 'art'. It's a reflection of all the disparate things we were listening to when we recorded it." He was nevertheless pleased that listeners identified their influences: "What really blew my head off was the fact that people got all the things, all the textures and the sounds and the atmospheres we were trying to create."

== Legacy ==
=== Retrospective appraisal ===
Retrospective reviews (after 1997)
Review scores
| Source | Rating |
|---|---|
| AllMusic | 5/5 stars |
| The A.V. Club | A |
| Blender | 5/5 stars |
| Christgau's Consumer Guide | B− |
| Encyclopedia of Popular Music | 5/5 stars |
| MusicHound Rock | 5/5 |
| Q | 5/5 stars |
| The Rolling Stone Album Guide | 5/5 stars |
| Slant Magazine | 4.5/5 stars |
| Tom Hull – on the Web | B+ |

OK Computer has frequently appeared in professional lists of the greatest albums of all time. A number of publications, including NME, Melody Maker, Alternative Press, Spin, Pitchfork, Time, Metro Weekly and Slant Magazine placed OK Computer prominently in lists of best albums of the 1990s or of all time. It was voted number 4 in Colin Larkin's All Time Top 1000 Albums 3rd Edition (2000). Rolling Stone ranked it 42 on its list of The 500 Greatest Albums of All Time in 2020. It was previously ranked at 162 in 2003 and 2012. In 2019, Classic Rock named it the 47th-best rock album, writing: "Combining prog with alternative influences, they came up with a style that was supple, subtle and sensuous. This wasn't Pink Floyd for the end of the millennium, it was original, visionary and brilliant [...] An epochal album that called time on the narrow colloquial nostalgia of Britpop, sold millions and turned Radiohead into global angst-rock superstars, OK Computer is not quite the flawless masterpiece of fond folklore, but it holds up extremely well." In 2026, OK Computer was inducted into the Grammy Hall of Fame.

Retrospective reviews from BBC Music, The A.V. Club and Slant were favourable. Rolling Stone gave the album five out of five in the 2004 edition of The Rolling Stone Album Guide, with Rob Sheffield writing: "Radiohead was claiming the high ground abandoned by Nirvana, Pearl Jam, U2, R.E.M., everybody; and fans around the world loved them for trying too hard at a time when nobody else was even bothering." Christgau said later that "most would rate OK Computer the apogee of pomo texture". In 2014, the United States National Recording Preservation Board selected the album for preservation in the National Recording Registry of the Library of Congress, which designates it as a sound recording that has had significant cultural, historical or aesthetic impact in American life. In The New Yorker, Kevin Dettmar of described it as the record that made modern world possible for alternative rock music.

OK Computer has been cited by some as undeserving of its acclaim. In a poll surveying thousands conducted by BBC Radio 6 Music, OK Computer was named the sixth-most overrated album. David H. Green of The Daily Telegraph called the album "self-indulgent whingeing" and maintains that the positive critical consensus towards OK Computer is an indication of "a 20th-century delusion that rock is the bastion of serious commentary on popular music" to the detriment of electronic and dance music. The album was selected as an entry in "Sacred Cows", an NME column questioning the critical status of "revered albums", in which Henry Yates said "there's no defiance, gallows humour or chink of light beneath the curtain, just a sense of meek, resigned despondency" and criticised the record as "the moment when Radiohead stopped being 'good' [compared to The Bends] and started being 'important'". In a Spin article on the "myth" that "Radiohead Can Do No Wrong", Chris Norris argues that the acclaim for OK Computer inflated expectations for subsequent Radiohead releases. Christgau felt "the reason the readers of the British magazine Q absurdly voted OK Computer the greatest album of the 20th century is that it integrated what was briefly called electronica into rock". Having deemed it "self-regarding" and overrated, he later warmed to the record and found it indicative of Radiohead's cerebral sensibility and "rife with discrete pleasures and surprises".

=== Commentary, interpretation and analysis ===
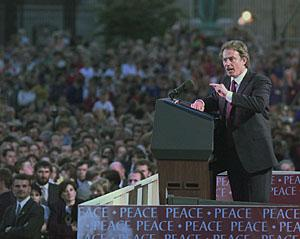
In interviews after the album's release, Thom Yorke criticised Tony Blair (pictured in 1998) and his New Labour government – echoing the album's pervasive theme of political disillusionment.

OK Computer was recorded in the lead up to the 1997 general election and released a month after the victory of Tony Blair's New Labour government. The album was perceived by critics as an expression of dissent and scepticism toward the new government and a reaction against the national mood of optimism. Dorian Lynskey wrote, "On May 1, 1997, Labour supporters toasted their landslide victory to the sound of 'Things Can Only Get Better.' A few weeks later, OK Computer appeared like Banquo's ghost to warn: No, things can only get worse." According to Amy Britton, the album "showed not everyone was ready to join the party, instead tapping into another feeling felt throughout the UK—pre-millennial angst. ... huge corporations were impossible to fight against—this was the world OK Computer soundtracked, not the wave of British optimism."

In an interview, Yorke doubted that Blair's policies would differ from the preceding two decades of Conservative government. He said the public reaction to the death of Princess Diana was more significant, as a moment when the British public realised "the royals had had us by the balls for the last hundred years, as had the media and the state." The band's distaste with the commercialised promotion of OK Computer reinforced their anti-capitalist politics, which would be further explored on their subsequent releases.

Critics have compared Radiohead's statements of political dissatisfaction to those of earlier rock bands. David Stubbs said that, where punk rock had been a rebellion against a time of deficit and poverty, OK Computer protested the "mechanistic convenience" of contemporary surplus and excess. Alex Ross said the album "pictured the onslaught of the Information Age and a young person's panicky embrace of it" and made the band into "the poster boys for a certain kind of knowing alienation—as Talking Heads and R.E.M. had been before." Jon Pareles of The New York Times found precedents in the work of Pink Floyd and Madness for Radiohead's concerns "about a culture of numbness, building docile workers and enforced by self-help regimes and anti-depressants".

The album's tone has been described as millennial or futuristic, anticipating cultural and political trends. According to The A.V. Club writer Steven Hyden, "Radiohead appeared to be ahead of the curve, forecasting the paranoia, media-driven insanity, and omnipresent sense of impending doom that's subsequently come to characterise everyday life in the 21st century." In 1000 Recordings to Hear Before You Die, Tom Moon described OK Computer as a "prescient ... dystopian essay on the darker implications of technology ... oozing [with] a vague sense of dread, and a touch of Big Brother foreboding that bears strong resemblance to the constant disquiet of life on Security Level Orange, post-9/11." Chris Martin of Coldplay said: "It would be interesting to see how the world would be different if Dick Cheney really listened to Radiohead's OK Computer. I think the world would probably improve. That album is fucking brilliant. It changed my life, so why wouldn't it change his?"

The album inspired a radio play, also titled OK Computer, which was first broadcast on BBC Radio 4 in 2007. The play, written by Joel Horwood, Chris Perkins, Al Smith and Chris Thorpe, interprets the album into a story about a man who awakens in a Berlin hospital with memory loss and returns to England with doubts that the life he has returned to is his own.

=== Influence ===
A lot of people have taken OK Computer and said, 'This is the yardstick. If I can attain something half as good, I'm doing pretty well.' But I've never heard anything really derivative of OK Computer—which is interesting, as it shows that what Radiohead were doing was probably even more complicated than it seemed.

— Josh Davis (DJ Shadow)

The whole sound of it and the emotional experience crossed a lot of boundaries. It tapped into a lot of buried emotions that people hadn't wanted to explore or talk about.

— James Lavelle

The release of OK Computer coincided with the decline of Britpop. (Note: Britpop, which reached its peak popularity in the mid-1990s and was led by bands such as Oasis, Blur and Pulp, was typified by nostalgic homage to British rock of the 1960s and 1970s. The genre was a key element of the broader cultural movement Cool Britannia. Starting in 1997, a number of events marked the end of the genre's heyday; these included Blur spurning the conventional Britpop sound on Blur and Oasis' Be Here Now failing to live up to the expectations of critics and the public. See Footman 2007, pp. 177–178) Alexis Petridis of The Guardian called the album "the defining sound of rock's post-Britpop shift". Through OK Computer's influence, the dominant UK guitar pop shifted toward an approximation of "Radiohead's paranoid but confessional, slurry but catchy" approach. Many newer British acts adopted similarly complex, atmospheric arrangements; for example, the post-Britpop band Travis worked with Godrich to create the languid pop texture of The Man Who, which became the fourth best-selling album of 1999 in the UK. Some in the British press accused Travis of appropriating Radiohead's sound. Steven Hyden of AV Club said that by 1999, starting with The Man Who, "what Radiohead had created in OK Computer had already grown much bigger than the band," and that the album went on to influence "a wave of British-rock balladeers that reached its zenith in the '00s".

OK Computer influenced the next generation of British alternative rock bands, (Note: Specifically, critics have cited the album's influence on Muse, Coldplay, Snow Patrol, Keane, Travis, Doves, Badly Drawn Boy, Editors and Elbow. See: Aza, Bharat (15 June 2007), "Ten years of OK Computer and what have we got?", The Guardian, archived from the original on 6 August 2011; Eisenbeis, Hans (July 2001), "The Empire Strikes Back", Spin; Richards, Sam (8 April 2009), "Album review: Radiohead Reissues – Collectors Editions", Uncut, archived from the original on 6 December 2010) and musicians in a variety of genres have praised it. (Note: Musicians who have praised the album include R.E.M. frontman Michael Stipe, former Smiths guitarist Johnny Marr, DJ Shadow, Guns N' Roses guitarist Slash, Manic Street Preachers member Nicky Wire, The Divine Comedy frontman Neil Hannon, Mo' Wax label owner James Lavelle, Sonic Youth and Gastr del Sol member and experimental musician Jim O'Rourke, former Depeche Mode member Alan Wilder and contemporary composer Esa-Pekka Salonen. See: Bidwell, Chad (25 February 1999), "Jim O'Rourke", Ink 19, archived from the original on 31 March 2017; Cavanagh, David (February 2007), "Communication Breakdown", Uncut; Smith, RJ (September 1999), "09: Radiohead: OK Computer", Spin; Timberg, Scott (28 January 2003), "The maestro rocks", Los Angeles Times, archived from the original on 6 August 2011; Turner, Luke (9 May 2011), "Alan Wilder of Recoil & Depeche Mode's 13 Favourite LPs – Page 8", The Quietus, archived from the original on 6 September 2011) Bloc Party and TV on the Radio listened to or were influenced by OK Computer; TV on the Radio's debut album was titled OK Calculator as a lighthearted tribute. Radiohead described the pervasiveness of bands that "sound like us" as one reason to break with the style of OK Computer for their next album, Kid A.

Although OK Computer's influence on rock is widely acknowledged, several critics believe that its experimental inclination was not authentically embraced on a wide scale. Footman said the "Radiohead Lite" bands that followed were "missing [OK Computer's] sonic inventiveness, not to mention the lyrical substance". David Cavanagh said that most of OK Computer's purported mainstream influence more likely stemmed from the ballads on The Bends. According to Cavanagh, "The populist albums of the post-OK Computer era—the Verve's Urban Hymns, Travis's Good Feeling, Stereophonics' Word Gets Around, Robbie Williams' Life thru a Lens—effectively closed the door that OK Computer's boffin-esque inventiveness had opened." John Harris believed that OK Computer was one of the "fleeting signs that British rock music might [have been] returning to its inventive traditions" in the wake of Britpop's demise. While Harris concludes that British rock ultimately developed an "altogether more conservative tendency", he said that with OK Computer and their subsequent material, Radiohead provided a "clarion call" to fill the void left by Britpop. The Pitchfork journalist Marc Hogan argued that OK Computer marked an "ending point" for the rock-oriented album era, as its mainstream and critical success remained unmatched by any rock album since.

OK Computer triggered a minor revival of progressive rock and ambitious concept albums, with a new wave of prog-influenced bands crediting OK Computer for enabling their scene to thrive. Brandon Curtis of Secret Machines said, "Songs like 'Paranoid Android' made it OK to write music differently, to be more experimental ... OK Computer was important because it reintroduced unconventional writing and song structures." Steven Wilson of Porcupine Tree said, "I don't think ambition is a dirty word any more. Radiohead were the Trojan Horse in that respect. Here's a band that came from the indie rock tradition that snuck in under the radar when the journalists weren't looking and started making these absurdly ambitious and pretentious—and all the better for it—records." In 2005, Q named OK Computer the tenth-best progressive rock album, and in 2014 it was voted the 87th-greatest by readers of Prog.

In 2006, the American reggae band the Easy Star All-Stars released Radiodread, a reggae interpretation of OK Computer. In 2007, the music blog Stereogum released OKX: A Tribute to OK Computer, with covers by artists including Vampire Weekend.

== Later releases ==
Airbag / How Am I Driving?, an EP compiling "Airbag" and the OK Computer B-sides, was released in April 1998 and was nominated for the Grammy Award for Best Alternative Music Performance. Radiohead's record contract with EMI, the parent company of Parlophone, ended in 2003. EMI retained the rights to Radiohead's material recorded under their contract, including OK Computer. In 2007, EMI released Radiohead Box Set, a compilation of albums recorded while Radiohead were signed to EMI. On 19 August 2008, EMI reissued OK Computer as a double LP as part of the "From the Capitol Vaults" series, along with other Radiohead albums. It became the tenth-bestselling vinyl record of 2008, selling almost 10,000 copies. The reissue was connected in the press to the resurgence of interest in vinyl in the early 21st century. In 2016, Yorke auctioned off a copy of William Blake's Songs of Innocence and of Experience, containing a draft of the "Airbag" lyrics and his own annotations, with proceeds going to Oxfam.

=== 2009 "Collector's Edition" reissue ===
"Collector's Edition" ratings
Review scores
| Source | Rating |
|---|---|
| AllMusic | 5/5 stars |
| The A.V. Club | A |
| Paste | 100/100 |
| Pitchfork | 10/10 |
| Rolling Stone | 5/5 stars |
| Q | 5/5 stars |
| Uncut | 5/5 stars |

On 24 March 2009, EMI reissued OK Computer as an expanded "Collector's Edition", alongside Pablo Honey and The Bends, without Radiohead's involvement. The reissue was released in a 2-CD edition and an expanded 2-CD, 1-DVD edition. The first disc contains the original album, the second disc contains B-sides collected from OK Computer singles and live recording sessions, and the DVD contains a collection of music videos and a live television performance. All the material had been previously released and the music was not remastered.

AllMusic, Uncut, Q, Rolling Stone, Paste and PopMatters praised the supplemental material, but with reservations. Scott Plagenhoef of Pitchfork awarded the reissue a perfect score, arguing that it was worth buying for fans who did not already own the extra material. Plagenhoef said: "That the band had nothing to do with these is beside the point: this is the final word on these records, if for no other reason that the Beatles' September 9 remaster campaign is, arguably, the end of the CD era." The A.V. Club writer Josh Modell praised the bonus disc and DVD, and said OK Computer was "the perfect synthesis of Radiohead's seemingly conflicted impulses".

=== XL reissues ===
In April 2016, XL Recordings acquired Radiohead's back catalogue. The EMI reissues, released without Radiohead's approval, were removed from streaming services. In May 2016, XL reissued Radiohead's back catalogue on vinyl, including OK Computer. On 23 June 2017, XL released a remastered 20th-anniversary OK Computer reissue, OKNOTOK 1997 2017. It includes eight B-sides and three previously unreleased tracks: "I Promise", "Man of War" and "Lift". The special edition includes books of artwork and notes and an audio cassette of demos and session recordings, including previously unreleased songs. OKNOTOK debuted at number two on the UK Album Chart, boosted by Radiohead's third headline performance at Glastonbury Festival. It was the best-selling album in independent UK record shops for a year.

=== MiniDiscs [Hacked] ===
In June 2019, nearly 18 hours of demos, outtakes and other material recorded during the OK Computer period leaked online. On 11 June, Radiohead made the archive available to stream or purchase from the music sharing site Bandcamp for 18 days, with proceeds going to the environmental advocacy group Extinction Rebellion.

== Track listing ==
All tracks are written by Thom Yorke, Jonny Greenwood, Philip Selway, Ed O'Brien and Colin Greenwood.

1. "Airbag" – 4:44
2. "Paranoid Android" – 6:23
3. "Subterranean Homesick Alien" – 4:27
4. "Exit Music (For a Film)" – 4:24
5. "Let Down" – 4:59
6. "Karma Police" – 4:21
7. "Fitter Happier" – 1:57
8. "Electioneering" – 3:50
9. "Climbing Up the Walls" – 4:45
10. "No Surprises" – 3:48
11. "Lucky" – 4:19
12. "The Tourist" – 5:24

== Personnel ==
Personnel adapted from OK Computer liner notes

- Nigel Godrich – committing to tape, audio level balancing
- Radiohead – committing to tape, music, string arrangements
  - Thom Yorke
  - Jonny Greenwood
  - Philip Selway
  - Ed O'Brien
  - Colin Greenwood
- Stanley Donwood – pictures
- The White Chocolate Farm – pictures
- Gerard Navarro – studio assistance
- Jon Bailey – studio assistance
- Chris Scard – studio assistance
- Chris "King Fader" Blair – mastering
- Nick Ingman – string conducting
- Matt Bale – additional artwork

== Charts ==
=== Weekly charts ===
Weekly chart performance for OK Computer
| Chart (1997–2017) | Peak position |
|---|---|
| Australian Albums (ARIA) | 7 |
| Austrian Albums (Ö3 Austria) | 17 |
| Belgian Albums (Ultratop Flanders) | 1 |
| Belgian Albums (Ultratop Wallonia) | 3 |
| Canada Top Albums/CDs (RPM) | 2 |
| Dutch Albums (Album Top 100) | 2 |
| European Albums (Billboard) | 3 |
| Finnish Albums (Suomen virallinen lista) | 10 |
| French Albums (SNEP) | 3 |
| German Albums (Offizielle Top 100) | 13 |
| Hungarian Albums (MAHASZ) | 39 |
| Irish Albums (IRMA) | 1 |
| Italian Albums (FIMI) | 6 |
| Japanese Albums (Oricon) | 16 |
| New Zealand Albums (RMNZ) | 1 |
| Norwegian Albums (VG-lista) | 4 |
| Scottish Albums (Official Charts) | 1 |
| Spanish Albums (PROMUSICAE) | 42 |
| Swedish Albums (Sverigetopplistan) | 3 |
| Swiss Albums (Schweizer Hitparade) | 40 |
| UK Albums (Official Charts) | 1 |
| US Billboard 200 | 21 |
| US Top Dance Albums (Billboard) | 1 |
| US Top Rock Albums (Billboard) | 6 |

| Chart (2023–2025) | Peak position |
|---|---|
| Argentine Albums (CAPIF) | 6 |
| Croatian International Albums (HDU) | 6 |
| Icelandic Albums (Tónlistinn) | 13 |
| Polish Albums (ZPAV) | 76 |
| Portuguese Albums (AFP) | 21 |

=== Year-end charts ===
1997 year-end chart performance for OK Computer
| Chart (1997) | Position |
|---|---|
| Australian Albums (ARIA) | 72 |
| Belgian Albums (Ultratop Flanders) | 23 |
| Belgian Albums (Ultratop Wallonia) | 23 |
| Canadian Albums (Nielsen Soundscan) | 46 |
| Dutch Albums (Album Top 100) | 40 |
| European Albums (Billboard) | 16 |
| French Albums (SNEP) | 28 |
| New Zealand Albums (RMNZ) | 10 |
| Swedish Albums (Sverigetopplistan) | 68 |
| UK Albums (OCC) | 8 |
| US Billboard 200 | 187 |

1998 year-end chart performance for OK Computer
| Chart (1998) | Position |
|---|---|
| Australian Albums (ARIA) | 86 |
| Canadian Albums (RPM) | 69 |
| European Albums (Billboard) | 19 |
| New Zealand Albums (RMNZ) | 19 |
| UK Albums (OCC) | 41 |
| US Billboard 200 | 142 |

1999 year-end chart performance for OK Computer
| Chart (1999) | Position |
|---|---|
| UK Albums (OCC) | 182 |

2002 year-end chart performance for OK Computer
| Chart (2002) | Position |
|---|---|
| Canadian Alternative Albums (Nielsen SoundScan) | 180 |

2007 year-end chart performance for OK Computer
| Chart (2007) | Position |
|---|---|
| Belgian Midprice Albums (Ultratop Flanders) | 39 |

2024 year-end chart performance for OK Computer
| Chart (2024) | Position |
|---|---|
| Icelandic Albums (Tónlistinn) | 90 |

2025 year-end chart performance for OK Computer
| Chart (2025) | Position |
|---|---|
| Belgian Albums (Ultratop Flanders) | 67 |
| Belgian Albums (Ultratop Wallonia) | 125 |
| Dutch Albums (Album Top 100) | 59 |
| Icelandic Albums (Tónlistinn) | 18 |
| Swedish Albums (Sverigetopplistan) | 98 |
| UK Albums (OCC) | 69 |

== Certifications and sales ==
Certifications and sales for OK Computer
| Region | Certification | Certified units/sales |
|---|---|---|
| Argentina (CAPIF) | Platinum | 60,000^{^} |
| Australia (ARIA) | Platinum | 70,000^{^} |
| Belgium (BRMA) | 2× Platinum | 100,000^{*} |
| Canada (Music Canada) | 5× Platinum | 500,000^{‡} |
| Denmark (IFPI Danmark) | 4× Platinum | 80,000^{‡} |
| France (SNEP) | 2× Gold | 200,000^{*} |
| Iceland (FHF) | — | 7,622 |
| Italy (FIMI) sales since 2009 | 2× Platinum | 100,000^{‡} |
| Japan (RIAJ) | Gold | 100,000^{^} |
| Netherlands (NVPI) | Platinum | 100,000^{^} |
| New Zealand (RMNZ) | 2× Platinum | 30,000^{‡} |
| Norway (IFPI Norway) | Gold | 25,000^{*} |
| Spain (Promusicae) | Gold | 50,000^{^} |
| Sweden (GLF) | Gold | 40,000^{^} |
| Switzerland (IFPI Switzerland) | Gold | 25,000^{^} |
| United Kingdom (BPI) | 5× Platinum | 1,579,415 |
| United States (RIAA) | 2× Platinum | 2,000,000^{^} |
Summaries
| Europe (IFPI) | 3× Platinum | 3,000,000^{*} |
^{*} Sales figures based on certification alone.^{^} Shipments figures based on certification alone.^{‡} Sales+streaming figures based on certification alone.

== Notes ==
=== Bibliography ===
- Britton, Amy (2011). Revolution Rock: The Albums Which Defined Two Ages. AuthorHouse. ISBN 978-1-4678-8710-6.
- Clarke, Martin (2010). Radiohead: Hysterical and Useless. London: Plexus. ISBN 978-0-85965-439-5.
- Footman, Tim (2007). Welcome to the Machine: OK Computer and the Death of the Classic Album. New Malden: Chrome Dreams. ISBN 978-1-84240-388-4.
- Griffiths, Dai (2004). OK Computer. 33⅓ series. New York: Continuum International Publishing Group. ISBN 0-8264-1663-2.
- Harris, John (2004). Britpop!: Cool Britannia and the Spectacular Demise of English Rock. Cambridge: Da Capo Press. ISBN 0-306-81367-X.
- Letts, Marianne Tatom (2010). Radiohead and the Resistant Concept Album: How to Disappear Completely. Profiles in Popular Music. Bloomington, Indiana: Indiana University Press. ISBN 978-0-253-35570-6.
- Lynskey, Dorian (2011). 33 Revolutions per Minute: A History of Protest Songs, from Billie Holiday to Green Day. HarperCollins. ISBN 978-0-06-167015-2.
- Moon, Tom (2008). "OK Computer". 1,000 Recordings to Hear Before You Die. New York: Workman. pp. 627–628. ISBN 978-0-85965-439-5.
- Randall, Mac (2000). Exit Music: The Radiohead Story. New York: Delta Trade Paperbacks. ISBN 0-385-33393-5.
- Ross, Alex (2010). Listen to This. New York: Farrar, Straus and Giroux. ISBN 978-0-374-18774-3.
- Sheffield, Rob (2004). "Radiohead". In Brackett, Nathan; Hoard, Christian (eds.). The New Rolling Stone Album Guide. New York: Fireside. ISBN 0-7432-0169-8.
