= Eugenio Recuenco =

Spanish photographer

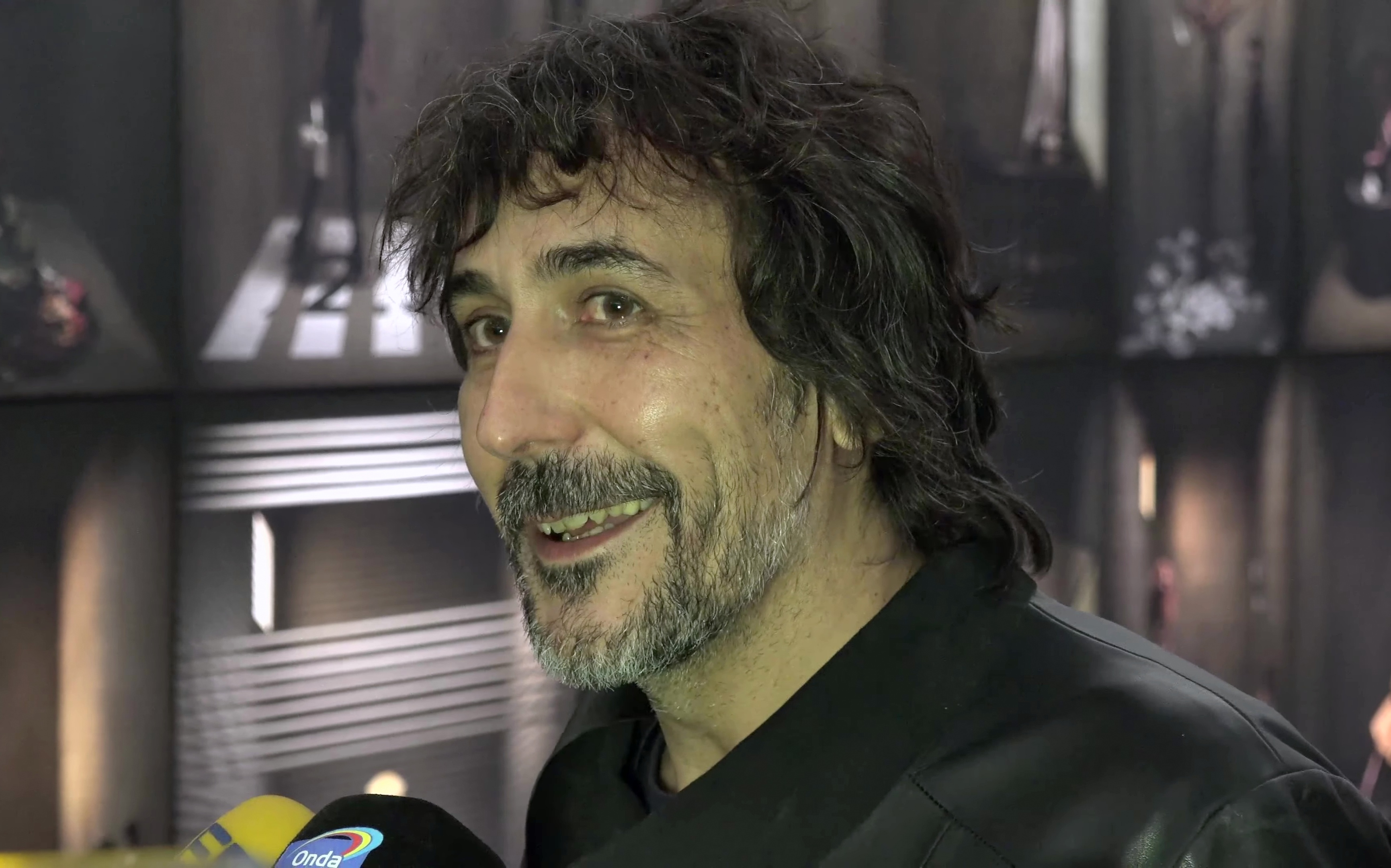
- Recuenco in 2018.
- Born: 1968 (age 57–58)
- Occupation: Photographer
- Known for: Photography

Eugenio Recuenco (born 1968) is a photographer from Madrid, Spain, who works mostly in the publishing and advertising fields. Compared to others, his personal style has been referred to as "cinematographic" and "pictorial". His work has been featured in magazines such as Vogue, Madame Figaro and Twill.

He is also one of two directors for Rammstein's music video for Mein Herz brennt; the other director being Zoran Bihać.
