= Lucky (Radiohead song) =

1997 single by Radiohead

Single by Radiohead

from the album The Help Album and OK Computer
- B-side: "Meeting in the Aisle" "Climbing Up the Walls" (Fila Brazillia Mix)
- Released: 26 December 1997 (France)
- Recorded: 4 September 1995
- Genre: Space rock
- Length: 4:19 (album); 3:59 (single)
- Label: Parlophone
- Songwriters: Thom Yorke; Jonny Greenwood; Ed O'Brien; Colin Greenwood; Philip Selway
- Producers: Nigel Godrich; Radiohead

Radiohead singles chronology
"Karma Police" (1997)	"Lucky" (1997)	"No Surprises" (1998)

Licensed audio
- "Lucky" on YouTube

"Lucky" is a song by the English rock band Radiohead, first released on The Help Album, a 1995 charity compilation organised by the charity War Child. "Lucky" was recorded in five hours with the producer Nigel Godrich. Radiohead included it on their third studio album, OK Computer (1997), and released it as a single in France in December 1997.

== Recording ==
In 1995, Radiohead were on tour, promoting their second album, The Bends. During soundchecks in Japan, the guitarist Ed O'Brien produced a high-pitched sound by strumming above the guitar nut. Radiohead developed the sound into "Lucky", which became part of the set list.

Around this time, the producer Brian Eno asked Radiohead to contribute a song to The Help Album, a charity compilation organised by the charity War Child. It was to be recorded in a single day, 4 September 1995, and rush-released that week.

Radiohead recorded "Lucky" in five hours with engineer Nigel Godrich, who had assisted producer John Leckie with The Bends and produced several Radiohead B-sides. Godrich went on to produce their third album, OK Computer. He said of the recording session: "Those things are the most inspiring, when you do stuff really fast and there's nothing to lose. We left feeling fairly euphoric."

Yorke later said "Lucky" shaped the sound and mood of OK Computer. He said: "'Lucky' was indicative of what we wanted to do. It was like the first mark on the wall."

== Release ==
To promote The Help Album, "Lucky" was the lead track on the Help EP, which charted at number 51 after BBC Radio 1 chose not to play it. It was included as the 11th track on OK Computer. "Lucky" was planned for release as a single, but due to circumstances beyond the band's control, it was issued only in France on 26 December 1997.

== Track listing ==
All tracks are written by Radiohead (Thom Yorke, Jonny Greenwood, Ed O'Brien, Colin Greenwood, Philip Selway).

French single (CD)
No.	Title	Length
1.	"Lucky"	3:59
2.	"Meeting in the Aisle"	3:08
3.	"Climbing Up the Walls" (Fila Brazillia Mix)	6:24
Total length:		13:31

== Charts ==
Chart (1996)	Peak position
Iceland (Íslenski Listinn Topp 40)	22

== Bibliography ==
- Footman, Tim (2008). Welcome to the Machine: OK Computer and the Death of the Classic Album. New Malden: Chrome Dreams. ISBN 978-1-84240-388-4.
- Randall, Mac (2000). Exit Music: The Radiohead Story. New York: Delta Trade Paperbacks. ISBN 0-385-33393-5.
