= Karma Police =

1997 single by Radiohead

Single by Radiohead

from the album OK Computer
- B-side: "Meeting in the Aisle"; "Lull"
- Released: 25 August 1997
- Genre: Alternative rock; pop rock
- Length: 4:24
- Label: Parlophone; Capitol
- Songwriters: Thom Yorke; Jonny Greenwood; Ed O'Brien; Colin Greenwood; Philip Selway
- Producers: Nigel Godrich; Radiohead

Radiohead singles chronology
| "Paranoid Android" (1997) | "Karma Police" (1997) | "Lucky" (1997) |

Audio sample
- file; help

Music video
- "Karma Police" on YouTube

"Karma Police" is a song by the English rock band Radiohead, released on 25 August 1997 as the second single from their third studio album, OK Computer (1997). It features acoustic guitar and piano, and lyrical themes of insanity and dissatisfaction with capitalism.

The music video, directed by Jonathan Glazer, has the singer, Thom Yorke, in the back of a car pursuing a man. It won the MTV Video Music Award for Best Direction at the 1997 MTV Video Music Awards.

"Karma Police" reached number one in Iceland and number eight on the UK singles chart. In the US, it reached number 14 on the US Billboard Modern Rock Tracks chart. It was included on Radiohead: The Best Of (2008). Rolling Stone placed "Karma Police" at number 279 in its rankings of the 500 greatest songs of all time in 2021 and 2024.

== Composition ==
"Karma Police" is in common time and played in standard tuning. The key is ambiguous and changes throughout. The verse section can be interpreted as either moving between A natural minor and A dorian, or between E natural minor and E phrygian. The chorus section is in G major and the coda section can be interpreted in either B minor or D major. Acoustic guitar and piano are the most prominent instruments. The piano riff resembles part of "Sexy Sadie" by the Beatles.

The song progresses from the intro into a mid-tempo section which alternates between a verse and a chorus. The verse begins with the line "Karma police", and the chorus begins with the line "This is what you'll get". After this section cycles through twice, the song switches into a second section which is based around the line "For a minute there, I lost myself". Thom Yorke's voice is put through a reverb effect and a sliding melodic figure serves as a counterpoint to his vocals. In the final minute, Ed O'Brien distorts his guitar by driving a delay effect to self-oscillation, then lowering the delay rate, creating a "melting" effect.

After Yorke told the producer, Nigel Godrich, that he was not happy with the ending, the pair reconstructed it with loops and samples, a technique they developed on later Radiohead albums. Godrich said: "It was the first time we did anything like that. Just us in the studio, and a forerunner of a lot of things to come, good and bad."

== Lyrics ==
The title lyric originates from an inside joke; the members of Radiohead would threaten to call the "karma police" if someone did something bad. Yorke said the song was about stress and "having people looking at you in that certain [malicious] way". He said: "It's for someone who has to work for a large company. This is a song against bosses. Fuck the middle management!"

Yorke and Jonny Greenwood emphasised that "Karma Police" was humorous and "not entirely serious". The lines "He buzzes like a fridge / He's like a detuned radio" refer to distracting, metaphorical background noise that Yorke called "fridge buzz", one of the themes of their 1997 album OK Computer. "Karma Police" also shares themes of insanity and dissatisfaction with capitalism.

Yorke cited the closing refrain, "Phew, for a minute there I lost myself", as an example of his practice of using everyday phrases in his lyrics; he said he probably heard it on television. According to the Financial Times, "When sung in his trembling high voice, this unexceptional phrase becomes charged with power." Yorke said: "It's so ironic that for years people would write about the way I wrote lyrics as if it's like some deep heartfelt thing. It's fucking not at all. It's like collage. It's just walking down the street and experiencing something and thinking, 'What would that be like if I stuck that in your face?'"

== Release ==
In the United Kingdom, "Karma Police" was issued as the second single from OK Computer on 25 August 1997. It was released on two CD singles and a 12-inch vinyl single and reached number eight on the UK Singles Chart. In the United States, the single was serviced to modern rock radio on 13 October 1997. Five months later, in March 1998, it peaked at number 14 on the Billboard Modern Rock Tracks chart. In March 2010, almost 13 years later, "Karma Police" reached number 15 on the Danish Singles Chart. Early versions of "Karma Police" were released on the 2019 compilation MiniDiscs [Hacked]. In 2023, American post-hardcore band Pierce the Veil covered "Karma Police" on Triple J while touring Australia.

== Critical reception ==
Steve Huey from AllMusic described "Karma Police" as "haunting, mystifying, and exquisite", labelling it "one of the cornerstones of one of the greatest albums of the '90s". The Daily Record declared it a "superb song". A reviewer from Music Week rated it four out of five, picking it as one of the "standout tracks" from OK Computer. Rolling Stone placed "Karma Police" at position 279 on its ranking of the 500 greatest songs of all time in 2021 and 2024. In 2020, the Guardian named it the fifth-best Radiohead song, writing: "'Karma Police' is an enduringly odd superhit: at once relatable, inscrutable and chilling ... Yorke learned, after much saccharine bumbling, to consolidate his bleak and mawkish impulses into one."

== Music video ==
Yorke in the video

The "Karma Police" music video was directed by Jonathan Glazer, who previously directed the video for Radiohead's 1996 single "Street Spirit (Fade Out)". The video is shot from the perspective of the driver of a car pursuing a man along a dark road, with Yorke in the back seat. The man falls to his knees and the car reverses, revealing that it is leaking fuel. The man produces matches from his pocket and ignites the trail of fuel. Yorke vanishes and the car is engulfed in flames.

Glazer initially pitched the concept to the American musician Marilyn Manson for his 1997 single "Long Hard Road Out of Hell". Manson wanted a video similar to David Lynch's 1997 film Lost Highway, which opens with a shot of a road rushing beneath the camera. After Manson rejected the concept, the video commissioner Dilly Gent recommended it to Radiohead for "Karma Police". According to Manson's collaborator Randy Sosin, after Manson saw the video, "Manson was like, 'Fuck that.' But, you know, a good idea is a good idea."

Glazer said he wanted to "shoot something very simple ... Where the whole narrative could be contained within a single sentence." The running man was played by the Hungarian actor Lajos Kovács. Kovács developed cramp during the running shots, and had to have injections in his leg to keep running. He also badly burnt his thumb during repeated takes lighting the book of matches behind his back.

The video premiered in August 1997. It won the MTV Video Music Award for Best Direction at the 1997 MTV Video Music Awards. In 2001, Glazer said he regarded the video as a failure, "because I decided to do a very minimalist, subjective use of camera, and tried to do something hypnotic and dramatic from one perspective, and it was very hard to achieve and I feel that I didn't achieve it". He described his video for the 1998 Unkle single "Rabbit in Your Headlights", featuring Yorke on vocals, as a more successful "partner" to the "Karma Police" video.

== Track listings ==
All songs written by Thom Yorke, Jonny Greenwood, Ed O'Brien, Colin Greenwood and Philip Selway.

- UK CD1 (CDODATAS 03)
  1. "Karma Police" – 4:23
  2. "Meeting in the Aisle" – 3:08
  3. "Lull" – 2:28
- UK CD2 (CDNODATA 03)
  1. "Karma Police" – 4:23
  2. "Climbing Up the Walls" (Zero 7 Mix) – 5:19
  3. "Climbing Up the Walls" (Fila Brazillia Mix) – 6:24
- UK 12-inch vinyl (12NODATA 03)
  - A1. "Karma Police" – 4:23
  - B1. "Meeting in the Aisle" – 3:08
  - B2. "Climbing Up the Walls" (Zero 7 Mix) – 5:19

== Charts ==
=== Weekly charts ===
| Chart (1997–2013) | Peak position |
|---|---|
| Australia (ARIA) | 71 |
| Belgium (Ultratip Bubbling Under Flanders) | 9 |
| Belgium (Ultratop 50 Wallonia) | 35 |
| Canada (Nielsen SoundScan) | 59 |
| Denmark (Tracklisten) | 15 |
| Europe (Eurochart Hot 100) | 14 |
| Finland (Suomen virallinen lista) | 15 |
| France (SNEP) | 153 |
| Iceland (Íslenski Listinn Topp 40) | 1 |
| Ireland (IRMA) | 15 |
| Israel (IBA) | 9 |
| Italy Airplay (Music & Media) | 2 |
| Netherlands (Dutch Top 40) | 33 |
| Netherlands (Single Top 100) | 50 |
| New Zealand (Recorded Music NZ) | 32 |
| Scottish Singles Sales (Official Charts) | 7 |
| UK Singles (Official Charts) | 8 |
| US Radio Songs (Billboard) | 69 |
| US Alternative Airplay (Billboard) | 14 |

=== Year-end charts ===
| Chart (1997) | Position |
|---|---|
| Iceland (Íslenski Listinn Topp 40) | 2 |
| Israel (IBA) | 14 |

| Chart (1998) | Position |
|---|---|
| US Modern Rock Tracks (Billboard) | 41 |

== Certifications ==
| Region | Certification | Certified units/sales |
|---|---|---|
| Canada (Music Canada) | Platinum | 80,000^{‡} |
| Italy (FIMI) | Platinum | 50,000^{‡} |
| New Zealand (RMNZ) | 2× Platinum | 60,000^{‡} |
| United Kingdom (BPI) | Platinum | 600,000^{‡} |
^{‡} Sales+streaming figures based on certification alone.

== Bibliography ==
- Footman, Tim (2007). Welcome to the Machine: OK Computer and the Death of the Classic Album. Chrome Dreams. ISBN 978-0-634-04619-3.
- Griffiths, Dai (2004). OK Computer. Continuum International Publishing Group. ISBN 0-8264-1663-2.
- Osborn, Brad (2013). "Subverting the Verse–Chorus Paradigm: Terminally Climactic Form in Recent Rock Music." Music Theory Spectrum 35, no. 1, pp. 23–47.
- Randall, Mac (2000). Exit Music: The Radiohead Story. Omnibus Press. ISBN 0-385-33393-5.
- OK Computer: Radiohead: Guitar, Tablature, Vocal. Alfred Publishing Company. 2001. ISBN 0-7579-9166-1.
