= Tim Footman =

British author, journalist and editor

Tim Footman (born 1968) is an English author, journalist and editor. He was educated at Churcher's College, Appleby College in Canada, the University of Exeter, and Birkbeck University.

He is the author of a number of books about popular music, including Welcome to the Machine: OK Computer and the Death of the Classic Album (2007, ISBN 1-84240-388-5), a study of Radiohead's 1997 album OK Computer and its impact on contemporary music. He also contributed a chapter on Baudrillard and Radiohead to the volume Radiohead and Philosophy (Chicago: Open Court, 2009). His most recent books are The Noughties 2000-2009: A Decade That Changed the World (published by Crimson Books, 2009) and Leonard Cohen: Hallelujah - A New Biography (published by Chrome Dreams, 2009).

His work has appeared in The Guardian, Mojo, Time Out, Prospect, the Bangkok Post, The National, the Sunday Post, Yorkshire Post, BBC Online, CNNGo, Drowned in Sound, Careless Talk Costs Lives, Aeon, Zembla, Twill and the International Journal of Baudrillard Studies. He is a contributor to the Guardian's comment website Comment is Free and the Prospect blog First Drafts. He appeared in the BBC2 documentary TV series History of Now (2010) and the Arte documentary film The World According to Radiohead (2019).

From 1999 to 2001, he was the editor of Guinness World Records, during which time its emphasis became markedly more light-hearted. Before this he was editor of the PUSH Guide to University.

He has made appearances on several UK television and radio quiz show including Mastermind, University Challenge, The Weakest Link, Brain of Britain, Counterpoint and Win Beadle's Money.
