= The Young Knives ...Are Dead ...And Some =

Compilation album by The Young Knives
- Released: 30 July 2007
- Genre: Indie rock, post-punk revival
- Length: 29:29
- Label: Shifty Disco

The Young Knives chronology
Voices of Animals and Men (2006)	The Young Knives ...Are Dead ...And Some (2007)	Superabundance (2008)

The Young Knives ...Are Dead ...And Some is a compilation of tracks by the Young Knives, released on 30 July 2007. The band's former label Shifty Disco released the compilation of the tracks from The Young Knives... Are Dead and its follow-up EP Rollerskater. The album is an enhanced CD, which enables owners to access the rare music video for "Walking on the Autobahn".

DIY rated it two stars and noted, "Ordinarily, we’d say that this album is for hardcore fans only; but most hardcore fans would probably have the original early recordings to start with."

== Track listing ==
1. "Walking on the Autobahn" – 2:52
2. "English Rose" – 3:06
3. "John" – 2:55
4. "The Night of the Trees" – 2:30
5. "Grand Opening" – 3:41
6. "Working Hands" – 3:04
7. "Diamonds in the West" – 4:30
8. "Rollerskater" – 2:51
9. "So Sue Me" – 2:51
10. "St Petersburg Wedding" – 1:23

== Personnel ==
- Henry Dartnall – vocals, guitar
- Thomas "The House of Lords" Bonsu-Dartnall – Bass guitar, vocals
- Oliver Askew – drums
