= Chris Hopewell =

British music video director

Chris Hopewell is an English music video director. He has directed videos for Radiohead, Franz Ferdinand, The Killers, Scissor Sisters, Run the Jewels, Louis XIV, The Knife, The Offspring, Avenged Sevenfold, and several others. His video for Radiohead's "There There" received an award for art direction at the 2003 MTV Video Music Awards. He also co-directed with Crispian Mills on the film A Fantastic Fear of Everything.

A passion of his, Hopewell co-founded the company Collision Films, which operated from 2002 to 2012. Through his graphic design agency, Jacknife, he has also worked with acts such as Queens of the Stone Age, Iggy Pop, Stanley Donwood, Interpol, and Misfits.

== Filmography ==
=== Films ===
- A Fantastic Fear of Everything (2012, co-director)

=== Music videos ===
- Radiohead — "There There" (2003)
- Scissor Sisters — "Comfortably Numb" (2004)
- Blonde Redhead — "Equus" (2004)
- Razorlight — "Vice" (2004)
- Franz Ferdinand — "The Dark of the Matinée" (2004)
- The Zutons — "Confusion" (2004)
- Mylo — "Destroy Rock & Roll" (2005)
- McQueen — "Running Out of Things to Say" (2005)
- Louis XIV — "Finding Out True Love Is Blind" (2005)
- The Killers — "Smile Like You Mean It" (2005)
- Editors — "Blood" (2005)
- Persephone's Bees — "Nice Day" (2005)
- Young Knives — "The Decision" (2005)
- Young Knives — "She's Attracted To" (2006)
- Young Knives — "Weekends and Bleak Days (Hot Summer)" (2006)
- Franz Ferdinand — "Eleanor Put Your Boots On" (2006)
- Goldfrapp — "Fly Me Away" (2006)
- The Knife — "Marble House" (2006)
- The Bees — "Who Cares What the Question Is?" (2007)
- Cherry Ghost — "People Help the People" (2007)
- Young Knives — "Turn Tail" (2008)
- The Offspring — "You're Gonna Go Far, Kid" (2008)
- McFly — "Lies" (2008)
- Graham Coxon — "Dead Bees" (2009)
- Graham Coxon — "In the Morning" (2009)
- Spinnerette — "Baptized by Fire" (2009)
- Radiohead — "Burn the Witch" (2016)
- Avenged Sevenfold — "The Stage" (2016)
- Run the Jewels — "Don't Get Captured" (2017)
- Father John Misty — "Things It Would Have Been Helpful to Know Before the Revolution" (2017)
- Father John Misty — "Please Don't Die" (2018)
- Cat Stevens – "Where Do the Children Play?" (2020)
- Cat Stevens – "Father and Son" (2020)
- Run the Jewels — "Walking in the Snow" (2020)
- Avenged Sevenfold — "Nobody" (2023)
- Avenged Sevenfold — "Cosmic" (2024)
- Wet Leg - "Davina McCall" (2025)
