= Com Lag (2plus2isfive) =

2004 EP by Radiohead

EP by Radiohead
- Released: 24 March 2004
- Recorded: September 2002 – February 2003, 26 November 2003
- Genre: Experimental rock
- Length: 36:21
- Label: Toshiba-EMI
- Producers: Nigel Godrich; Radiohead

Radiohead chronology
Hail to the Thief (2003)	Com Lag (2plus2isfive) (2004)	In Rainbows (2007)

Com Lag (2plus2isfive) is an EP by the English rock band Radiohead, released in Japan and Australia on 24 March 2004. It was reissued in the UK and the US in 2007. It compiles B-sides from Radiohead's sixth album, Hail to the Thief (2003), along with remixes by Cristian Vogel and Four Tet and two live performances.

== Music ==
"Paperbag Writer" features "sinister fractured funk". Its title references the Beatles song "Paperback Writer". "I Am a Wicked Child" is a "tainted, eerie missive" with harmonica. "Where Bluebirds Fly" is a "rattling, fidgety" electronic piece Radiohead used as the introduction music for their Hail to the Thief tour. "I Will (Los Angeles Version)" is an alternative version of "I Will" from Hail to the Thief, and "Fog (Again)" is a live performance of the Amnesiac B-side "Fog", rearranged for piano. The EP also includes remixes by Christian Vogel and Four Tet and a live version of "2 + 2 = 5".

== Release ==
Com Lag was initially released in Japan and Australia on 24 March 2004. Early Japanese pressings were printed with a fault that produced static in some tracks. In 2007, Com Lag was released in the UK on 16 April and in the US on 8 May. In 2020, Radiohead released a jigsaw puzzle based on the cover.

== Critical reception ==
Professional ratings
Review scores
Source	Rating
AllMusic	2.5/5 stars
Encyclopedia of Popular Music	3/5 stars
NME	7/10
Pitchfork	4.0/10

Reviewing Com Lag for NME, Anthony Thornton wrote: "Never content with relaxing into an accepted way of doing things, this record, while being flawed – it is a B-sides compilation after all – confirms Radiohead as the true inheritors of the Beatles' legacy rather than Oasis." The Paste critic Jeff Elbel described Com Lag as "an appealing but inessential curio".

AllMusic's Andy Kellman wrote that Com Lag would be "useful only to the most devoted Radiohead followers", and said its B-sides were inferior to those on Radiohead's 1998 EP Airbag / How Am I Driving. Chris Ott of Pitchfork wrote: "You'd expect more from ideas that Radiohead fleshed out as a unit, but the stolen-time experiments and solo performances on this EP's tail end far outshine its exhausting first half." In 2020, the Guardian named the "thrilling" live version of "2 + 2 = 5" the 31st-greatest Radiohead song.

== Track listing ==
All tracks are written by Radiohead.

Com Lag (2plus2isfive) track listing
No.	Title	Original release	Length
1.	" 2 + 2 = 5" (live at Earls Court, London, 26 November 2003)	Previously unreleased	3:34
2.	"Remyxomatosis" (Cristian Vogel remix)	"2 + 2 = 5" (UK CD single)	5:08
3.	"I Will" (Los Angeles version)	"2 + 2 = 5" (UK CD single)	2:13
4.	"Paperbag Writer"	"There There" (single)	3:58
5.	"I Am a Wicked Child"	"Go to Sleep" (Canadian/UK CD single and US 7")	3:05
6.	"I Am Citizen Insane"	"Go to Sleep" (Canadian/UK CD single)	3:32
7.	"Skttrbrain" (Four Tet remix)	"2 + 2 = 5" (UK CD single)	4:26
8.	"Gagging Order"	"Go to Sleep" (UK/US CD single)	3:35
9.	"Fog (Again)" (live)	"Go to Sleep" (Canadian/UK CD single)	2:19
10.	"Where Bluebirds Fly"	"There There" (single)	4:23
Total length:			36:21

Note: The disc also contains a live video of "2 + 2 = 5" performed at the Belfort Festival.

== Personnel ==
- Radiohead – production
- Nigel Godrich – production, engineering
- Graeme Stewart – engineering
- Darrell Thorp – engineering
- Stanley Donwood – design
- Cristian Vogel – remixing
- Four Tet – remixing

== Certifications ==
Region	Certification	Certified units/sales
Japan (RIAJ)	Gold	100,000^{^}
^{^} Shipments figures based on certification alone.
