= Here Comes the Rumour Mill =

Single by Young Knives

from the album Voices of Animals and Men
- Released: 27 February 2006
- Genre: Indie rock
- Length: 3:32
- Label: Transgressive Records
- Songwriter(s): Henry Dartnall, Thomas Dartnall, Oliver Askew

Young Knives singles chronology
"The Decision" (2005)	"Here Comes the Rumour Mill" (2006)	"She's Attracted To" (2006)

Here Comes the Rumour Mill is a song by English indie rock band Young Knives and is featured on their debut album, Voices of Animals and Men. It was released on 27 February 2006 and reached a peak position of #36 in the UK Singles Chart.

== Track listing ==
CD:

1. "Here Comes the Rumour Mill" – 3:32
2. "We Are the Also Rans" – 3:06

7" vinyl:

1. "Here Comes the Rumour Mill" – 3:32
2. "We Are the Also Rans" – 3:06
3. "Elaine" – 4:14
4. "Kitchener" – 2:58

== Charts ==
Chart (2006)	Position
UK Singles (OCC)	36
