= Terra Firma (song) =

Single by Young Knives

from the album Superabundance
- Released: 29 October 2007
- Genre: Indie rock
- Length: 2:49
- Label: Transgressive Records
- Songwriters: Henry Dartnall, Thomas Dartnall, Oliver Askew

Young Knives singles chronology
"The Decision" (2006)	"Terra Firma" (2007)	"Up All Night" (2008)

"Terra Firma" is a song by English indie rock band Young Knives and is featured on their third studio album, Superabundance. The first single taken from the album, it was released on 29 October 2007 and reached a peak position of #43 in the UK Singles Chart.

== Track listing ==
1. "Terra Firma" – 2:49
2. "Holiday Everyday"
