= Hail to the Thief =

2003 studio album by Radiohead

Studio album by Radiohead
- Released: 9 June 2003
- Recorded: September 2002 – early 2003
- Studios: Ocean Way, Hollywood; Radiohead studio, Oxfordshire
- Genres: Alternative rock; art rock; experimental rock; electronic rock
- Length: 56:35
- Labels: Parlophone; Capitol
- Producers: Nigel Godrich; Radiohead

Radiohead chronology
I Might Be Wrong: Live Recordings (2001)	Hail to the Thief (2003)	Com Lag (2plus2isfive) (2004)

Singles from Hail to the Thief
- 1. "There, There" Released: 21 May 2003; 2. "Go to Sleep" Released: 18 August 2003; 3. "2 + 2 = 5" Released: 17 November 2003

Hail to the Thief is the sixth studio album by the English rock band Radiohead. It was released on 9 June 2003 through Parlophone internationally, and through Capitol Records in the United States on 10 June. It was the last album released under Radiohead's record contract with EMI, the parent company of Parlophone and Capitol.

After transitioning to a more electronic style on their albums Kid A (2000) and Amnesiac (2001), which were recorded through protracted studio experimentation, Radiohead sought to work more spontaneously, combining electronic and rock music. They recorded most of Hail to the Thief in two weeks in Ocean Way Recording, Los Angeles, with their longtime producer, Nigel Godrich, focusing on live takes rather than overdubs. The singer, Thom Yorke, wrote lyrics in response to the election of the US president George W. Bush and the unfolding war on terror. He took phrases from political discourse and combined them with elements from fairy tales and children's literature. The title is a play on the American presidential anthem, "Hail to the Chief".

Following a high-profile internet leak of unfinished material ten weeks before release, Hail to the Thief debuted at number one on the UK Albums Chart and number three on the US Billboard 200 chart. It was certified platinum in the UK and Canada and gold in several countries. It was promoted with the singles "There, There", "Go to Sleep" and "2 + 2 = 5", and short films, music videos and webcasts streamed from Radiohead's website.

Hail to the Thief was the fifth consecutive Radiohead album nominated for a Grammy Award for Best Alternative Music Album and won for the Grammy Award for Best Engineered Non-Classical Album. It received positive reviews, and Rolling Stone named it the 89th-best album of the 2000s. In later years, the band members expressed regrets about it, feeling it was overlong and unfinished. It was followed by the 2004 B-sides compilation Com Lag (2plus2isfive) and the 2025 live album Hail to the Thief (Live Recordings 2003–2009). Yorke reworked the music for Hamlet Hail to the Thief, a production of Hamlet that opened in 2025.

== Background ==
With their previous albums Kid A (2000) and Amnesiac (2001), recorded simultaneously, Radiohead replaced their guitar-led rock sound with a more electronic style. For the tours, they learned how to perform the music live, combining synthetic sounds with rock instrumentation. The singer, Thom Yorke, said: "Even with electronics, there is an element of spontaneous performance in using them. It was the tension between what's human and what's coming from the machines. That was stuff we were getting into." Radiohead did not want to make a "big creative leap or statement" with their next album.

In early 2002, after the Amnesiac tour had finished, Yorke sent his bandmates CDs of demos. The CDs, titled The Gloaming, Episcoval and Hold Your Prize, comprised electronic music alongside piano and guitar sketches. Radiohead had tried to record some of the songs, such as "I Will", for Kid A and Amnesiac, but were not satisfied with the results. They spent May and June 2002 arranging and rehearsing the songs before performing them on their tour of Spain and Portugal in July and August.

== Recording ==
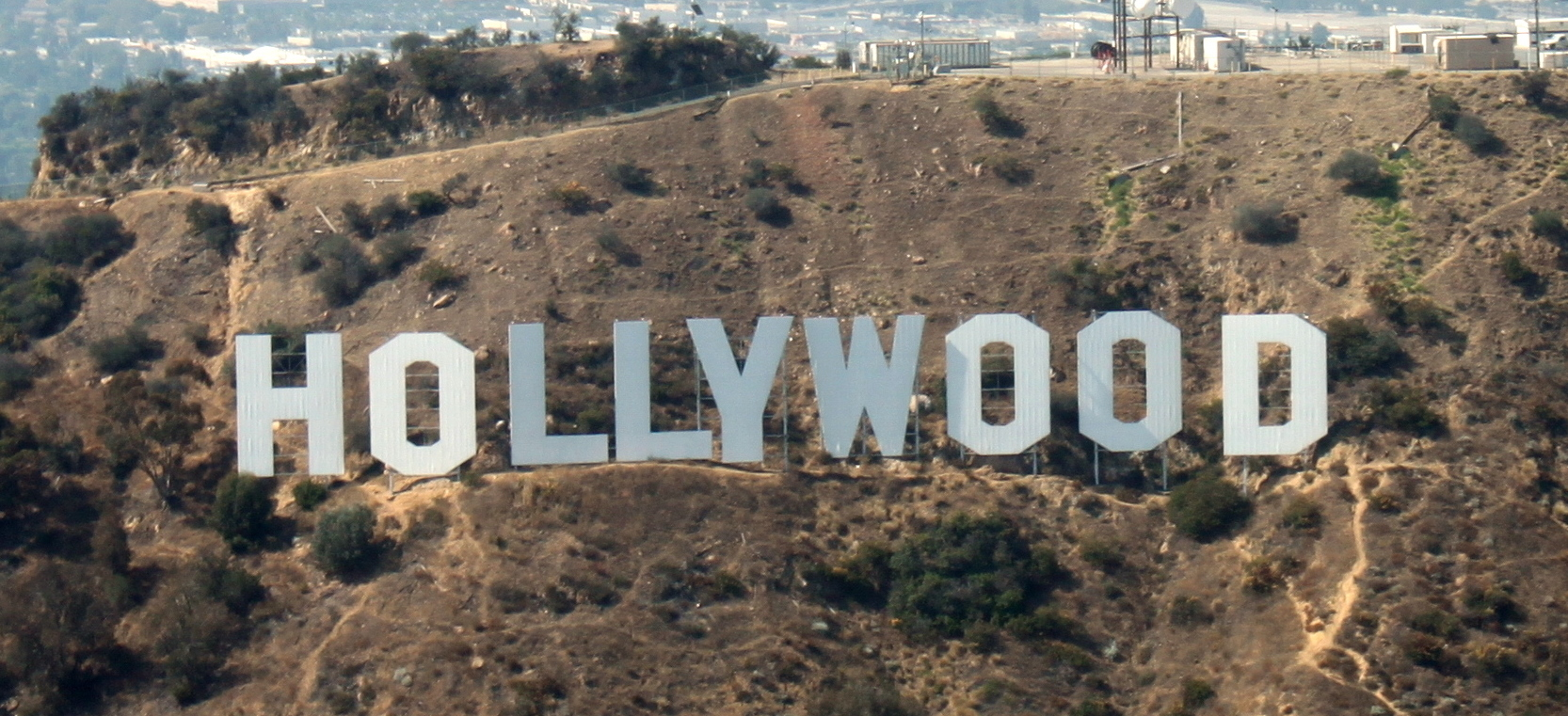
Most of Hail to the Thief was recorded in two weeks in Hollywood, Los Angeles. Hollywood culture influenced the lyrics and artwork.

In September 2002, Radiohead moved to Ocean Way Recording in Hollywood, Los Angeles, with their longtime producer, Nigel Godrich. The studio was suggested by Godrich, who had used it to produce records by Travis and Beck and thought it would be a "good change of scenery" for Radiohead. Yorke said: "We were like, 'Do we want to fly halfway around the world to do this?' But it was terrific, because we worked really hard. We did a track a day. It was sort of like holiday camp." Godrich later said his clearest memory of the sessions was Yorke repeatedly saying how much he hated Los Angeles.

Kid A and Amnesiac were created through a years-long process of recording and editing that the drummer, Philip Selway, described as "manufacturing music in the studio". For their next album, Radiohead sought to capture a more immediate, "live" sound. Most electronic elements were not overdubbed, but recorded live in the studio.

The band integrated computers into their performances with other instruments. Yorke said "everything was about performance, like staging a play". Radiohead tried to work quickly and spontaneously, avoiding procrastination and overanalysis. Yorke was forced to write lyrics differently, as he did not have time to rewrite them in the studio. For some songs, he returned to the method of cutting up words and arranging them randomly he had employed for Kid A and Amnesiac.

The lead guitarist, Jonny Greenwood, used the music programming language Max to manipulate the band's playing. For example, he used it to process his guitar on "Go to Sleep", creating a random stuttering effect. He also continued to use modular synthesisers and the ondes Martenot, an early electronic instrument similar to a theremin. After having used effects pedals heavily on previous albums, he challenged himself to create interesting guitar parts without effects.

Inspired by the Beatles, Radiohead tried to keep the songs concise. The opening track, "2 + 2 = 5", was recorded as a studio test and finished in two hours. Radiohead struggled to record "There, There"; after rerecording it in their Oxfordshire studio, Yorke was so relieved to have captured it he wept, feeling it was their best work. Radiohead had recorded an electronic version of "I Will" in the Kid A and Amnesiac sessions, but abandoned it as "dodgy Kraftwerk". They used components of this version to create "Like Spinning Plates" on Amnesiac. For Hail to the Thief, they sought to "get to the core of what's good about the song" and not be distracted by production details or new sounds, settling on a stripped-back arrangement.

Radiohead recorded most of Hail to the Thief in two weeks, with additional recording and mixing at their studio in Oxfordshire, England, in late 2002 and early 2003. The guitarist Ed O'Brien told Rolling Stone that Hail to the Thief was the first Radiohead album "where, at the end of making it, we haven't wanted to kill each other". However, mixing and choosing the track list created conflict. According to Yorke, "There was a long sustained period during which we lived with it but it wasn't completely finished, so you get attached to versions and we had big rows about it." He said later that finishing the record was "particularly messy and fraught, we were very proud of it but there was a taste left in our mouths, it was a dark time in so many ways". According to Selway, "We started quickly. Then it... had more requirements." Godrich estimated that a third of the album comprises rough mixes from the Los Angeles sessions.

== Lyrics and themes ==
Pitchfork described the lyrics as "almost unrelentingly bleak, a violent dispatch bursting with Orwellian zombies, automatons incapable of seeing warning signs, 'accidents waiting to happen''". The lyrics were influenced by what Yorke called "the general sense of ignorance and intolerance and panic and stupidity" following the 2000 election of the US president George W. Bush. He took words and phrases from discourse around the unfolding war on terror, which he described as Orwellian euphemisms, and used them in the lyrics and artwork. Yorke said the "emotional context of those words had been taken away" and that he was "stealing it back". Though Yorke denied any intent to make a political statement, he said: "I desperately tried not to write anything political, anything expressing the deep, profound terror I'm living with day to day. But it's just fucking there, and eventually you have to give it up and let it happen."

Yorke, a new father, adopted a strategy of distilling the political themes into "childlike simplicity". He took phrases from fairy tales and folklore such as the tale of "Chicken Little", and from children's literature and television he shared with his son, such as the 1970s TV series Bagpuss. Parenthood made Yorke concerned about the condition of the world and how it could affect future generations. Greenwood said Yorke's lyrics expressed "confusion and escape, like 'I'm going to stay at home and look after the people I care about, buy a month's supply of food'." He said they were sarcastic, witty and ambiguous, though The Age also found them "sorrowful and condemning".

Yorke also took phrases from Dante's Inferno, the subject of his partner Rachel Owen's PhD thesis. Several songs, such as "2 + 2 = 5", "Sit Down. Stand Up", and "Sail to the Moon", reference Christian ideas of heaven and hell, a first for Radiohead's music. Other songs reference science fiction, horror and fantasy, such as the wolves and vampires of "A Wolf at the Door" and "We Suck Young Blood", the reference to the slogan "two plus two equals five" of the dystopian novel Nineteen Eighty-Four in "2 + 2 = 5", and the allusion to the giant of Gulliver's Travels in "Go to Sleep". He sometimes chose words for their sounds rather than meanings, such as the title "Myxomatosis" or the repeated phrase "the rain drops" on "Sit Down. Stand Up".

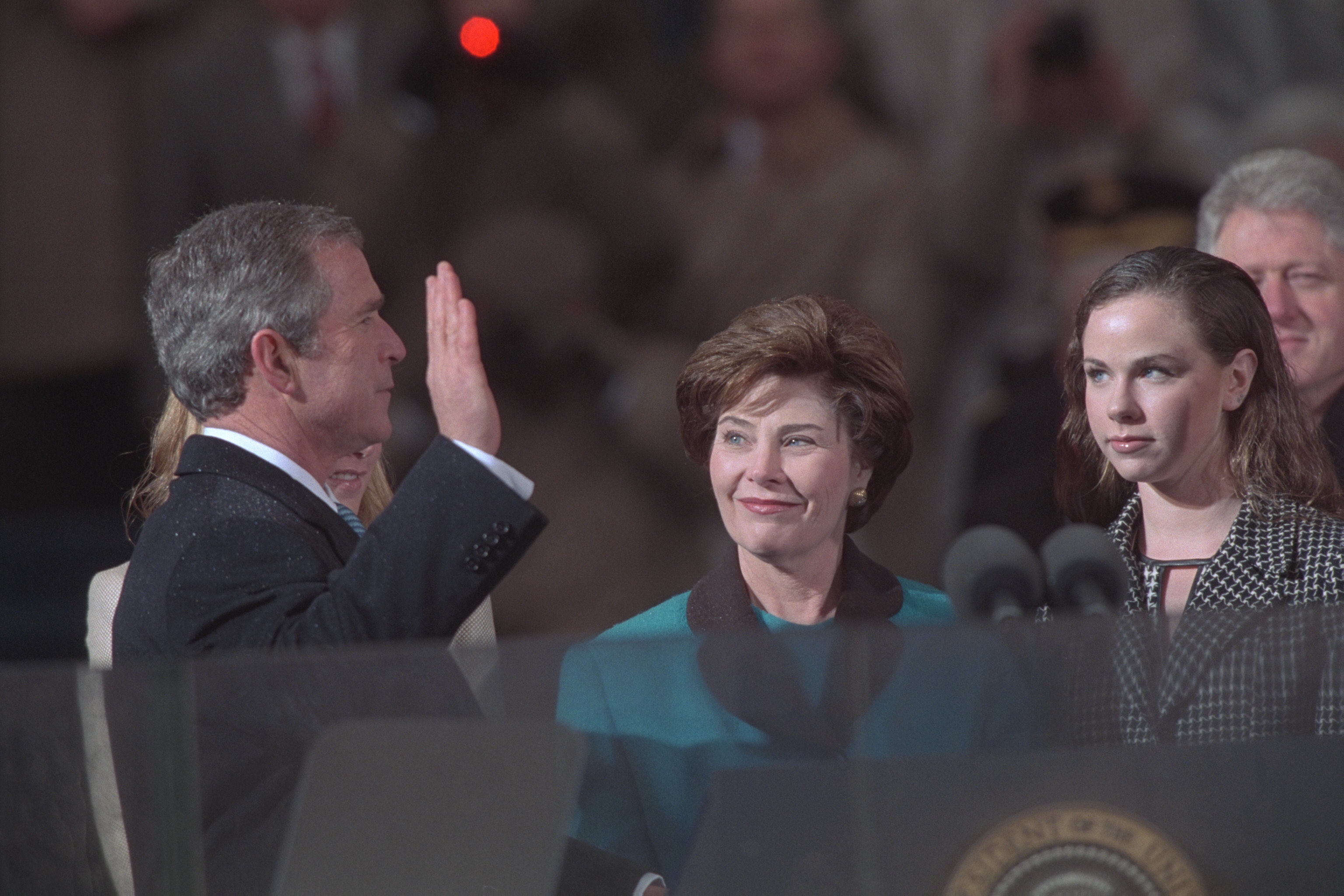
The phrase "hail to the thief" was used by protesters during the controversy surrounding the 2000 US presidential election.

Radiohead struggled to choose a title. They considered using The Gloaming (meaning "twilight" or "dusk"), but this was rejected as too poetic and "doomy" and so became the album's subtitle. They also considered the titles Little Man Being Erased, The Boney King of Nowhere and Snakes and Ladders, which became the alternative titles for "Go to Sleep", "There, There" and "Sit Down. Stand Up". The alternative titles were inspired by Victorian playbills showcasing moralistic songs played in music halls.

The phrase "hail to the thief" was used by anti-Bush protesters as a play on "Hail to the Chief", the American presidential anthem. Yorke described hearing it for the first time as a "formative moment". The phrase appears in the lyrics of "2 + 2 = 5". Radiohead chose it as the title partly in reference to Bush, but also in response to "the rise of doublethink and general intolerance and madness ... like individuals were totally out of control of the situation ... a manifestation of something not really human". The title also references the leak of an unfinished version of the album before its release and Yorke's insecurity over Radiohead's success. Yorke worried that it would be construed solely as reference to the US election, but his bandmates felt it "conjured up all the nonsense and absurdity and jubilation of the times". In 2025, Yorke said Jonny Greenwood had "begged him" not to use it.

== Music ==
Hail to the Thief incorporates alternative rock, art rock, experimental rock and electronic rock. It features more conventional rock instrumentation and less digital manipulation than Radiohead's previous albums Kid A and Amnesiac, with prominent use of live drums, guitar and piano, and Yorke's voice is less manipulated with effects. The Spin critic Will Hermes found that Hail to the Thief "seesaws between the chill of sequencers and the warmth of fingers on strings and keys". Rolling Stone said Hail to the Thief was "more tuneful and song-focused". Several tracks use the "Pixies-like" quiet-to-loud building of tension Radiohead had employed on previous albums.

Yorke denied that Hail to the Thief was a "guitar record". It retains electronic elements such as synthesisers, drum machines and sampling. Selway said the combination of rock and electronic music covered "the two hemispheres of the Radiohead brain". Radiohead saw Hail to the Thief as a "sparkly, shiny pop record. Clear and pretty." O'Brien felt it captured a new "swaggering" sound, with "space and sunshine and energy". He said it was "less cerebral and more physical", with more of the "punky adolescent energy" of their second record, The Bends (1995). In 2025, Rolling Stone described Hail to the Thief as Radiohead's "most punk album", with a "linear hard-rocking momentum unlike anything else in their catalogue". It is Radiohead's longest album.

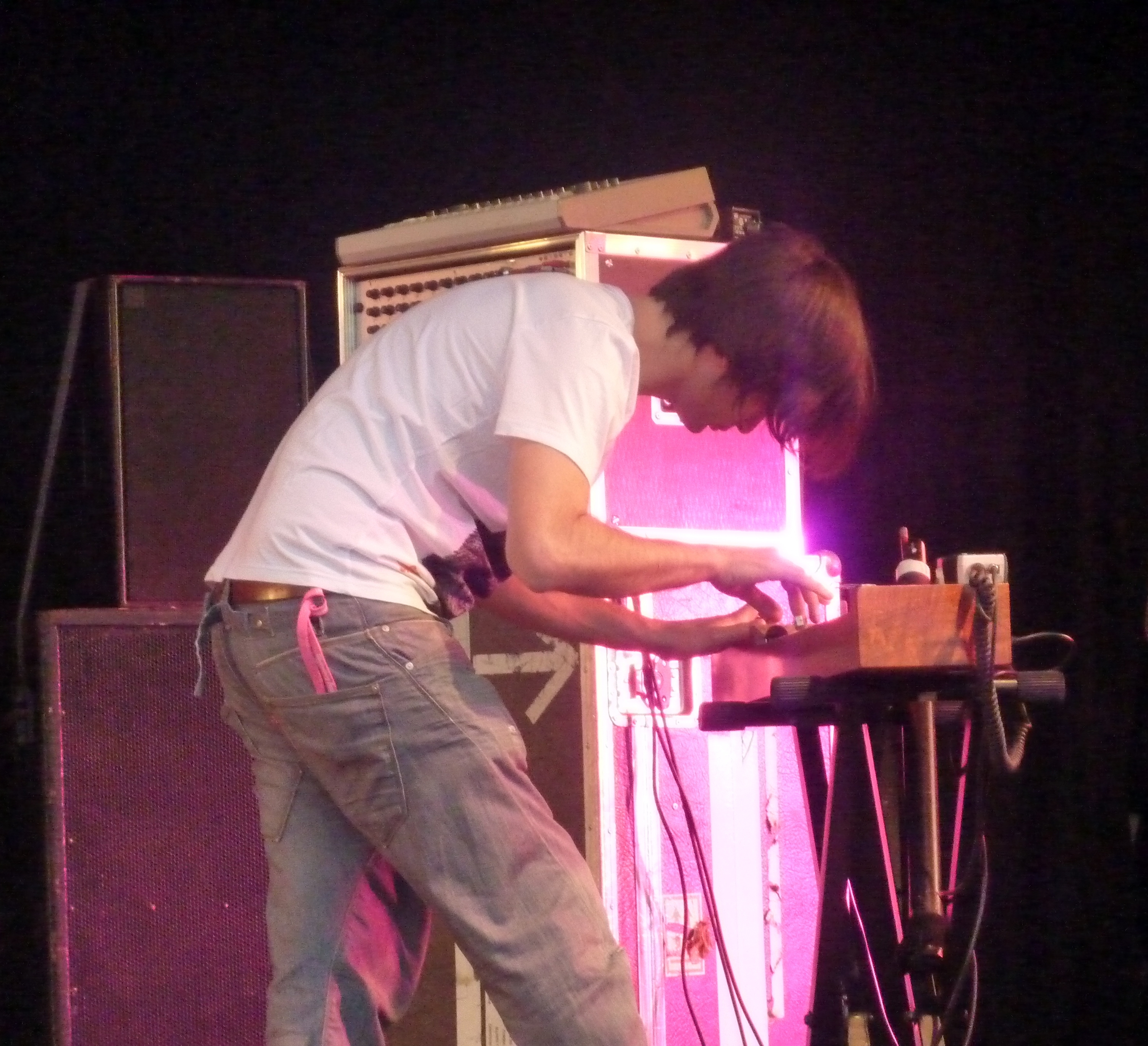
Jonny Greenwood used the ondes Martenot, an early electronic instrument, on several tracks.

The opening track, "2 + 2 = 5", begins with a sequenced drum pattern and a guitar arpeggio in ^{7}_{8} and builds to a loud climax. "Sit Down. Stand Up", an electronic song, was influenced by the jazz musician Charles Mingus. "Sail to the Moon" is a lullaby-like piano ballad with shifting time signatures. The lyrics allude to the Biblical story of Noah's Ark, and was written "in five minutes" for Yorke's infant son, Noah. "Backdrifts" is an electronic song about "the slide backwards that's happening everywhere you look".

"Go to Sleep" begins with an acoustic guitar riff that the bassist, Colin Greenwood, likened to 1960s English folk music. "Where I End and You Begin" is a rock song with "walls" of ondes Martenot and a rhythm section influenced by New Order. According to Yorke, "We Suck Young Blood" is a "slave ship tune" with a free jazz break, and is "not to be taken seriously". With ill-timed, "zombie-like" handclaps, the song satirises Hollywood culture and its "constant desire to stay young and fleece people, suck their energy".

"The Gloaming" is an electronic song with "mechanical" rhythms that Jonny Greenwood built from tape loops. Greenwood described it as "very old school electronica: no computers, just analogue synths, tape machines, and sellotape". Yorke said it was "the most explicit protest song on the record", with lyrics about the rise of fascism and "intolerance and bigotry and fear, and all the things that keep a population down". "There, There" is a rock song with layered percussion that builds to a loud climax. It was influenced by the bands Can, Siouxsie and the Banshees and the Pixies.

Yorke described "I Will" as the angriest song he had ever written. Its lyrics were inspired by news footage of the Amiriyah shelter bombing in the Gulf War, which killed about 400 people, including children and families. The funk-influenced "A Punchup at a Wedding" expresses the helplessness Yorke felt in the face of world events, and his anger over a negative review of Radiohead's homecoming performance in South Park, Oxford, in 2001. Yorke said the performance was "one of the biggest days in my life", and expressed dismay that "someone, just because they had access to a keyboard and a typewriter, could just totally write off an event that meant an awful lot to an awful lot of people".

For "Myxomatosis", built on a driving fuzz bassline, Radiohead sought to recreate the "frightening" detuned synthesiser sounds of 1970s and 1980s new wave bands such as Tubeway Army. Yorke said the lyrics were about mind control and media censorship. Jonny Greenwood described "Scatterbrain" as "simple and pretty" with chords that do not resolve. NME described the final track, "A Wolf at the Door" as "a pretty song, with a sinister monologue". Its lyrics were inspired by a party of unruly men Yorke encountered on a train. Yorke described its placement at the end of the album as "sort of like waking you up at the end ... It's all been a nightmare and you need to go and get a glass of water now."

== Artwork ==
The Hail to the Thief artwork was created by the longtime Radiohead collaborator Stanley Donwood, who joined them during the recording in Hollywood. Donwood initially planned to create artwork based on photographs of phallic topiary, but the idea was rejected by Yorke. Instead, the cover art is a roadmap of Hollywood, with words and phrases taken from roadside advertising in Los Angeles, such as "God", "TV" and "oil". Donwood said advertising was designed to be attractive, but that there was something "unsettling" about being sold something. He took the advertising slogans out of context to "remove the imperative" and "get to the pure heart of advertising".

Other words in the artwork were taken from Yorke's lyrics and political discussion surrounding the war on terror. Among them is "Burn the Witch", the title of a song Radiohead did not complete until their ninth album, A Moon Shaped Pool (2016). Other artworks included with the album refer to cities relevant to the war, including New York, London, Grozny and Baghdad. Early editions contained a fold-out road map of the cover.

Comparing the cover to the more subdued palettes of his prior Radiohead artworks, Donwood described the bright, "pleasing" colours as "ominous because all these colours that I've used are derived from the petrol-chemical industry ... We've created this incredibly vibrant society, but we're going to have to deal with the consequences sooner or later." The essayist Amy Britton interpreted the artwork as an allusion to the Bush administration's "road map for peace" plan for the Israeli–Palestinian conflict. Joseph Tate likened it to the paintings of the artist Jean Dubuffet and saw it as a portrayal of "capitalism's glaring visual presence: an oppressive sameness of style and colour that mirrors globalisation's reduction of difference".

== Release ==
On 30 March 2003, ten weeks before release, an unfinished version of Hail to the Thief was leaked online. The leak comprised rough edits and unmixed songs from January that year. On Radiohead's forum, Jonny Greenwood wrote that the band were "pissed off", not with downloaders but because of the "sloppy" release of unfinished work. Colin Greenwood said the leak was "like being photographed with one sock on when you get out of bed in the morning". However, he expressed dismay at the cease-and-desist orders sent by label EMI to radio stations and fan sites playing the leaked tracks, saying: "Don't record companies usually pay thousands of dollars to get stations to play their records? Now they're paying money to stations not to play them."

EMI decided against moving the release date earlier to combat the leak. The EMI executive Ted Mico said the leak had generated media coverage, and that EMI was confident that Hail to the Thief would sell. The leak partly influenced Radiohead's decision to self-release their next album, In Rainbows (2007), online, terming it "their leak date".

Hail to the Thief was released on 9 June 2003 by Parlophone Records in the UK and a day later by Capitol Records in the US. The CD was printed with copy protection in some regions; the Belgian consumer group Test-Achats received complaints that it would not play on some CD players. On 6 September, a demo of "Where I End and You Begin" was included on The Big Noise, a compilation album by various artists released with Guardian newspapers to support Make Trade Fair. A compilation of Hail to the Thief B-sides, remixes and live performances, Com Lag (2plus2isfive), was released in April 2004.

Hail to the Thief reached number one in the UK Albums Chart and stayed on the chart for 14 weeks, selling 114,320 copies in its first week. In the US, it entered at number three on the Billboard 200, selling 300,000 copies in its first week, more than any previous Radiohead album. By 2008, it had sold over a million copies in the US. It is certified platinum in the UK and Canada.

== Promotion ==
According to the Guardian critic Alexis Petridis, Hail to the Thief's marketing campaign was "by [Radiohead] standards ... a promotional blitzkrieg". In April 2003, promotional posters spoofing talent recruitment posters appeared in Los Angeles and London with slogans taken from the lyrics of "We Suck Young Blood". The posters included a phone number spelling the phoneword "to thief", which connected callers to a recording welcoming them to the "Hail to the Thief customer care hotline". In May, planes trailing Hail to the Thief banners flew over the California Coachella Festival.

"There, There" was released as the lead single on 21 May. The Guardian described the choice of a more conventional rock song as "diplomatic" following the divided response to Kid A and Amnesiac. Yorke asked the Bagpuss creator, Oliver Postgate, to create its music video, but he declined as he was retired. Instead, a stop-motion animated video was created by Chris Hopewell. The video debuted on the jumbotron in Times Square, New York, on 20 May, and received hourly play that day on MTV2. "Go to Sleep" and "2 + 2 = 5" were released as singles on 18 August and 17 November. Rolling Stone suggested that EMI chose the singles to "retrench Radiohead as a big rock band" and compete with acts such as Coldplay and Muse.

On May 26, Radiohead launched radiohead.tv, where they streamed short films, music videos and live webcasts from their studio at scheduled times. Visitors late for streams were shown a test card with "1970s-style" intermission music. Yorke said Radiohead had planned to broadcast the material on their own television channel, but this was cancelled due to "money, cutbacks, too weird, might scare the children, staff layoffs, shareholders". The material was released on the 2004 DVD The Most Gigantic Lying Mouth of All Time. Radiohead also relaunched their website, featuring digital animations on the themes of mass-media culture and 24-hour cities. Radiohead toured in 2003 and 2004, with performances in Europe, the US, Australia and Japan, including performances at the Coachella, Field Day and Glastonbury festivals. Radiohead rearranged some songs, such as "The Gloaming", which integrated live sampling and a new bassline.

== Critical reception ==
Professional ratings
Aggregate scores
Source	Rating
Metacritic	85/100
Review scores
Source	Rating
AllMusic	4/5 stars
Entertainment Weekly	A−
The Guardian	3/5 stars
Los Angeles Times	4/4 stars
Mojo	4/5 stars
NME	7/10
Pitchfork	9.3/10
Q	3/5 stars
Rolling Stone	4/5 stars
Spin	A

Hail to the Thief has a score of 85 out of 100 on review aggregate site Metacritic, indicating "universal acclaim". Neil McCormick, writing for The Daily Telegraph, called it "Radiohead firing on all cylinders, a major work by major artists at the height of their powers". Chris Ott of Pitchfork wrote that Radiohead had "largely succeeded in their efforts to shape pop music into as boundless and possible a medium as it should be" and named it the week's "Best New Music".

The New York critic Ethan Brown said that Hail to the Thief "isn't a protest album, and that's why it works so well. As with great Radiohead records past, such as Kid A, the music – restlessly, freakishly inventive – pushes politics far into the background." Andy Kellman of AllMusic wrote that "despite the fact that it seems more like a bunch of songs on a disc rather than a singular body, its impact is substantial", concluding that Radiohead had "entered a second decade of record-making with a surplus of momentum". In Mojo, Peter Paphides wrote that Hail to the Thief "coheres as well as anything else in their canon".

In The Independent, Nick Hasted wrote that Hail to the Thief was "a disappointing rest-stop" for Radiohead that "sinks its political ideas into a murk of allusive lyrics". James Oldham of NME saw it as "a good rather than great record... The impact of the best moments is dulled by the inclusion of some indifferent electronic compositions." The Q writer John Harris felt that it "comes dangerously close to being all experimentalism and precious little substance". Alexis Petridis of The Guardian wrote that while it was not a bad record, it was "neither startlingly different and fresh nor packed with the sort of anthemic songs that once made [Radiohead] the world's biggest band". He felt the political lyrics and bleak mood put Radiohead in danger of self-parody. Robert Christgau of The Village Voice wrote that Hail to the Thief flowed better than Radiohead's 1997 album OK Computer, but that its melodies and guitar work are "never as elegiac and lyrical" or "articulate and demented". He later awarded it an "honourable mention". Hail to the Thief was the fifth consecutive Radiohead album nominated for a Grammy Award for Best Alternative Music Album, and earned Godrich and the engineer Darrell Thorp the 2004 Grammy Award for Best Engineered Non-Classical Album.

=== Legacy ===
In 2010, Rolling Stone ranked Hail to the Thief the 89th-best album of the 2000s, writing that "the dazzling overabundance of ideas makes Hail to the Thief a triumph". In 2025, GQ named Hail to the Thief the eighth-best Radiohead album, with Josiah Gogarty writing that it was "stranded between their band's avant-garde run of OK Computer, Kid A and Amnesiac, and the late-career brilliance that started with In Rainbows". He suggested that it originated the perception of Radiohead's music as "Thom Yorke warbling vaguely political sentiments over fiddly drum patterns and melodies". Rolling Stone said Hail to the Thief was one of Radiohead's most divisive albums, which was "part of the fun".

Radiohead have criticised Hail to the Thief. In 2006, Yorke said: "I'd maybe change the playlist. I think we had a meltdown when we put it together ... We wanted to do things quickly, and I think the songs suffered." In 2008, he posted an alternative track listing on Radiohead's website, omitting "Backdrifts", "We Suck Young Blood", "I Will" and "A Punchup at a Wedding". O'Brien said Radiohead should have cut the album to ten songs and that its length had alienated some listeners; Colin Greenwood said several songs were unfinished and that the album was "a holding process". Jonny agreed that it was too long, and said: "We were trying to do what people said we were good at ... But it was good for our heads. It was good for us to be doing a record that came out of playing live."

In 2013, Godrich said: "I think there's some great moments on there – but too many songs ... As a whole I think it's charming because of the lack of editing. But personally it's probably my least favourite of all the albums ... It didn't really have its own direction. It was almost like a homogeny of previous work. Maybe that's its strength." In 2023, approaching its 20th anniversary, Selway described Hail to the Thief as a bridge between Kid A, Amnesiac and Radiohead's subsequent album, In Rainbows. He said its combination of electronic and rock music captured "two very distinctive characters of Radiohead ... That's what was lovely about it." In 2025, the Pitchfork critic Molly Mary O'Brien wrote that "as a timepiece, its foreboding sense of unease is quite suited for the present", citing the improved public image of George W. Bush, the presidency of Donald Trump and that year's US strikes on Iranian nuclear sites.

== Further releases ==
Radiohead left EMI after their contract ended in 2003. In 2007, EMI released Radiohead Box Set, a compilation of albums recorded while Radiohead were signed to EMI, including Hail to the Thief. After a period of being out of print on vinyl, Hail to the Thief was reissued as a double LP on 19 August 2008 as part of the "From the Capitol Vaults" series, along with other Radiohead albums. Radiohead performed some Hail to the Thief tracks for the 2008 live video In Rainbows – From the Basement.

On 31 August 2009, EMI reissued Hail to the Thief in a 2-CD "Collector's Edition" and a 2-CD 1-DVD "Special Collector's Edition". The first CD contains the original album; the second CD collects B-sides and live performances previously compiled on the Com Lag (2plus2isfive) EP; the DVD contains music videos and a live television performance. Radiohead had no input into the reissue and the music was not remastered. Pitchfork gave it 8.6 out of 10, naming the "Collector's Edition" the week's "best new reissue" and "Gagging Order" the best B-side included in the bonus material. The A.V. Club gave it A−, writing that the bonus content was all "worth hearing, though the live tracks stand out". The EMI reissues were discontinued after Radiohead's back catalogue was transferred to XL Recordings in 2016. In May 2016, XL reissued Radiohead's back catalogue on vinyl, including Hail to the Thief.

Yorke reworked Hail to the Thief for Hamlet Hail to the Thief, a production of Hamlet by the Royal Shakespeare Company that opened at Aviva Studios, Manchester, in April 2025. Yorke said Hail to the Thief "chimes with the underlying grief and paranoia" of Hamlet. He said working on the play had been a "healthy" way for Radiohead to revisit the album, which they felt unsatisfied with, and "claim back the original sentiment". In the process, Yorke revisited Radiohead's Hail to the Thief tour recordings and was "shocked at the energy ... I barely recognised us". Radiohead released a selection of performances as Hail to the Thief (Live Recordings 2003–2009) on digital formats on 13 August 2025, with CD and vinyl releases on 31 October.

== Track listing ==
All tracks are written by Radiohead.

Hail to the Thief track listing
No.	Title	Length
1.	"2 + 2 = 5" ("The Lukewarm.")	3:19
2.	"Sit Down. Stand Up." ("Snakes & Ladders.")	4:19
3.	"Sail to the Moon." ("Brush the Cobwebs Out of the Sky.")	4:18
4.	"Backdrifts." ("Honeymoon Is Over.")	5:22
5.	"Go to Sleep." ("Little Man Being Erased.")	3:21
6.	"Where I End and You Begin." ("The Sky Is Falling In.")	4:29
7.	"We Suck Young Blood." ("Your Time Is Up.")	4:56
8.	"The Gloaming." ("Softly Open Our Mouths in the Cold.")	3:32
9.	"There, There." ("The Boney King of Nowhere.")	5:25
10.	"I Will." ("No Man's Land.")	1:59
11.	"A Punchup at a Wedding." ("No No No No No No No No.")	4:57
12.	"Myxomatosis." ("Judge, Jury & Executioner.")	3:52
13.	"Scatterbrain." ("As Dead as Leaves.")	3:21
14.	"A Wolf at the Door." ("It Girl. Rag Doll.")	3:21
Total length:		56:35

== Personnel ==
Adapted from the Hail to the Thief liner notes.

Radiohead

- Thom Yorke – voice, words, guitar, piano, laptop
- Jonny Greenwood – guitar, analogue systems, ondes Martenot, laptop, toy piano, glockenspiel
- Colin Greenwood – bass, string synth, sampler
- Ed O'Brien – guitar, effects, voice
- Philip Selway – drums, percussion

Additional personnel

- Nigel Godrich – recording, editing, operation, mixing
- Darrell Thorp – engineering, backing up, cataloguing
- Plank – instrument maintenance and rebuilding
- Graeme Stewart – tape loops on "The Gloaming", engineering of preliminary sessions
- Stanley Donwood – painting, packaging

== Charts ==
=== Weekly charts ===
Weekly chart performance for Hail to the Thief
Chart (2003)	Peak position
Australian Albums (ARIA)	2
Austrian Albums (Ö3 Austria)	6
Belgian Albums (Ultratop Flanders)	2
Belgian Albums (Ultratop Wallonia)	1
Canadian Albums (Billboard)	1
Danish Albums (Hitlisten)	2
Dutch Albums (Album Top 100)	4
Finnish Albums (Suomen virallinen lista)	2
French Albums (SNEP)	1
German Albums (Offizielle Top 100)	3
Irish Albums (IRMA)	1
Italian Albums (FIMI)	3
Japanese Albums (Oricon)	2
New Zealand Albums (RMNZ)	3
Norwegian Albums (VG-lista)	2
Polish Albums (ZPAV)	6
Portuguese Albums (AFP)	2
Scottish Albums (Official Charts)	1
Spanish Albums (PROMUSICAE)	8
Swedish Albums (Sverigetopplistan)	6
Swiss Albums (Schweizer Hitparade)	3
UK Albums (Official Charts)	1
US Billboard 200	3

=== Year-end charts ===
Year-end chart performance for Hail to the Thief
Chart (2003)	Position
Australian Albums (ARIA)	73
Belgian Albums (Ultratop Flanders)	42
Belgian Albums (Ultratop Wallonia)	15
Dutch Albums (Album Top 100)	98
French Albums (SNEP)	80
Italian Albums (FIMI)	51
Swiss Albums (Schweizer Hitparade)	46
UK Albums (OCC)	58
US Billboard 200	83
Worldwide Albums (IFPI)	46

== Certifications ==
Certifications for Hail to the Thief
Region	Certification	Certified units/sales
Australia (ARIA)	Gold	35,000^{^}
Belgium (BRMA)	Gold	25,000^{*}
Canada (Music Canada)	Platinum	100,000^{^}
France (SNEP)	Gold	100,000^{*}
Japan (RIAJ)	Gold	100,000^{^}
New Zealand (RMNZ)	Gold	7,500^{^}
Switzerland (IFPI Switzerland)	Gold	20,000^{^}
United Kingdom (BPI)	Platinum	300,000^{^}
United States (RIAA)	Gold	1,120,000
Summaries
Europe (IFPI)	Platinum	1,000,000^{*}
^{*} Sales figures based on certification alone.^{^} Shipments figures based on certification alone.

== Sources ==
- Bendat, Jim. Democracy's Big Day: The Inauguration of our President 1789–2009. iUniverse Star, 2008. ISBN 978-1-58348-466-1.
- Britton, Amy. Revolution Rock: The Albums Which Defined Two Ages. AuthorHouse, 2011. ISBN 1-4678-8710-2.
- Forbes, Brandon W. Radiohead and Philosophy: Fitter Happier More Deductive. Open Court, 2009. ISBN 0-8126-9664-6
- Randall, Mac (2011). Exit Music: The Radiohead Story. Omnibus Press. ISBN 978-1849384575.
- Tate, Joseph. The Music and Art of Radiohead. Ashgate Publishing, 2005. ISBN 978-0-7546-3980-0.
