= Up All Night (Young Knives song) =

Single by Young Knives

from the album Superabundance
- Released: 25 February 2008
- Genre: Indie rock
- Length: 2:59
- Label: Transgressive Records
- Songwriter(s): Henry Dartnall, Thomas Dartnall, Oliver Askew

Young Knives singles chronology
"Terra Firma" (2007)	"Up All Night" (2008)	"Turn Tail" (2008)

"Up All Night" is a song by English indie rock band Young Knives and is featured on their third studio album, Superabundance. The second single taken from the album, it was released on 25 February 2008 and reached a peak position of #45 in the UK Singles Chart.

== Track listing ==
CD

1. "Up All Night" – 2:59
2. "Stand and Deliver" (Adam and the Ants cover) – 3:08
3. "Up All Night" (Live) – 3:32

== Charts ==
Chart (2008)	Position
UK Singles (OCC)	45
