= Superabundance =

Superabundance may refer to:

- Superabundance (album), a 2008 album by Young Knives
- Superabundance (algebraic geometry), an inequality in the Riemann–Roch theorem for surfaces
