= Hail to the Thief (Live Recordings 2003–2009) =

Live album by Radiohead
- Released: 13 August 2025
- Venue: Various
- Length: 47:41
- Label: XL
- Producer: Ian Davenport

Radiohead chronology
Kid A Mnesia (2021)	Hail to the Thief (Live Recordings 2003–2009) (2025)

Hail to the Thief (Live Recordings 2003–2009) is the second live album by the English rock band Radiohead, released on 13 August 2025 by XL Recordings. It comprises performances of songs from Radiohead's sixth album, Hail to the Thief (2003). Radiohead decided to release the recordings after revisiting them while working on the play Hamlet Hail to the Thief. Live Recordings received positive reviews.

== Background ==
Radiohead released their sixth album, Hail to the Thief, in 2003. The singer and songwriter, Thom Yorke, wrote many of its lyrics in response to the war on terror and the resurgence of right-wing politics in the west after the turn of the millennium.

Radiohead toured in 2003 and 2004, with performances in Europe, the US, Australia and Japan, including performances at the Field Day, Glastonbury and Coachella festivals. Radiohead rearranged some songs for live performance; for example, they integrated live sampling and a new bassline into "The Gloaming".

Years later, Yorke reworked the album for Hamlet Hail to the Thief, a production of Hamlet by the Royal Shakespeare Company that opened in 2025. In the process, he revisited Radiohead's Hail to the Thief performances and was "shocked at the energy ... I barely recognised us". He said to have not released them "would have been insane".

== Content ==
Live Recordings contains performances from cities including Dublin, Amsterdam, London and Buenos Aires. Radiohead described it as a way to "re-evaluate their relationship" with Hail to the Thief, and Rolling Stone described it as "basically a track-for-track remake". To bring it to vinyl length, it excludes "Backdrifts" and "A Punchup at a Wedding".

== Release ==
Hail to the Thief (Live Recordings 2003–2009) was released digitally on 13 August 2025, followed by CD and vinyl releases on 31 October. It was mixed by Ben Baptie and mastered by Matt Colton.

== Reception ==
Professional ratings
Aggregate scores
Source	Rating
Metacritic	83/100
Review scores
Source	Rating
AllMusic	4/5 stars
Classic Rock	3.5/5 stars
Mojo	4/5 stars
Record Collector	4/5 stars
Pitchfork	8.1/10
Rolling Stone	4/5 stars
Spectrum Culture	4/5 stars
Uncut	4/5 stars

In AllMusic, Neil Z. Yeung wrote that Live Recordings "is an energised, visceral reimagining of the original album, with the urgency of the band's performances and Yorke's uninhibited live vocals elevating these songs into a brand-new beast ... For any critics who complained that Hail to the Thief was just too long, bloated, and disjointed, this is the course correction that'll give that album the justice it has always deserved." In Spectrum Culture, Justin Vellichi argued that Live Recordings transcended Radiohead's previous live album, I Might Be Wrong (2001), and wrote: "As the western world faces political crisis, it's interesting to question why Radiohead revisited (and rereleased) music recorded during a different political crisis more than two decades ago."

Rolling Stone praised the performances and expressed hope for further live releases. In Pitchfork, Molly Mary O'Brien praised the "mutation of the acrid mood on the studio album into something immense, constructive, and cathartic". She wrote that Live Recordings "does feel like a particularly authentic musical expression of what the band truly is, and maybe always has been: not a band making protest music with a particular call to action, just a band checking the barometers and pointing out how fucked we already are".

== Track listing ==
No.	Title	Length
1.	"2 + 2 = 5"	3:36
2.	"Sit Down, Stand Up"	4:12
3.	"Sail to the Moon"	4:19
4.	"Go to Sleep"	3:46
5.	"Where I End and You Begin"	4:11
6.	"We Suck Young Blood"	4:57
7.	"The Gloaming"	3:59
8.	"There, There"	5:34
9.	"I Will"	2:09
10.	"Myxomatosis"	4:05
11.	"Scatterbrain"	3:26
12.	"A Wolf at the Door"	3:31
Total length:		47:41

== Charts ==
Weekly chart performance for Hail to the Thief (Live Recordings 2003–2009)
Chart (2025)	Peak position
Australian Albums (ARIA)	15
Belgian Albums (Ultratop Flanders)	9
Belgian Albums (Ultratop Wallonia)	31
Croatian International Albums (HDU)	1
Dutch Albums (Album Top 100)	15
Irish Albums (Official Charts)	29
Scottish Albums (Official Charts)	5
Spanish Albums (Promusicae)	59
UK Albums (Official Charts)	12
UK Independent Albums (Official Charts)	2
US Billboard 200	200
US Heatseekers Albums (Billboard)	4
US Independent Albums (Billboard)	20
US Vinyl Albums (Billboard)	5

The album charted on the UK Official Album Downloads Charts, reaching number 8 on 15 August 2025.

== Personnel ==
Adapted from the liner notes.

=== Radiohead ===
- Thom Yorke
- Jonny Greenwood
- Ed O'Brien
- Colin Greenwood
- Philip Selway

=== Other personnel ===
- Ian Davenport — pre-production and candidate selection
- Steve Williams, Nigel Godrich — recording (London shows)
- Jim Warren — recording (other shows)
- Matt Colton — tape research
- Kevin Vanbergen —tape restoration
- Ben Baptie — mixing
- Matt Colton — mastering
- Stanley Donwood, Dr Tchock – artwork
