= Samuel Blenkin =

English actor (born 1996)

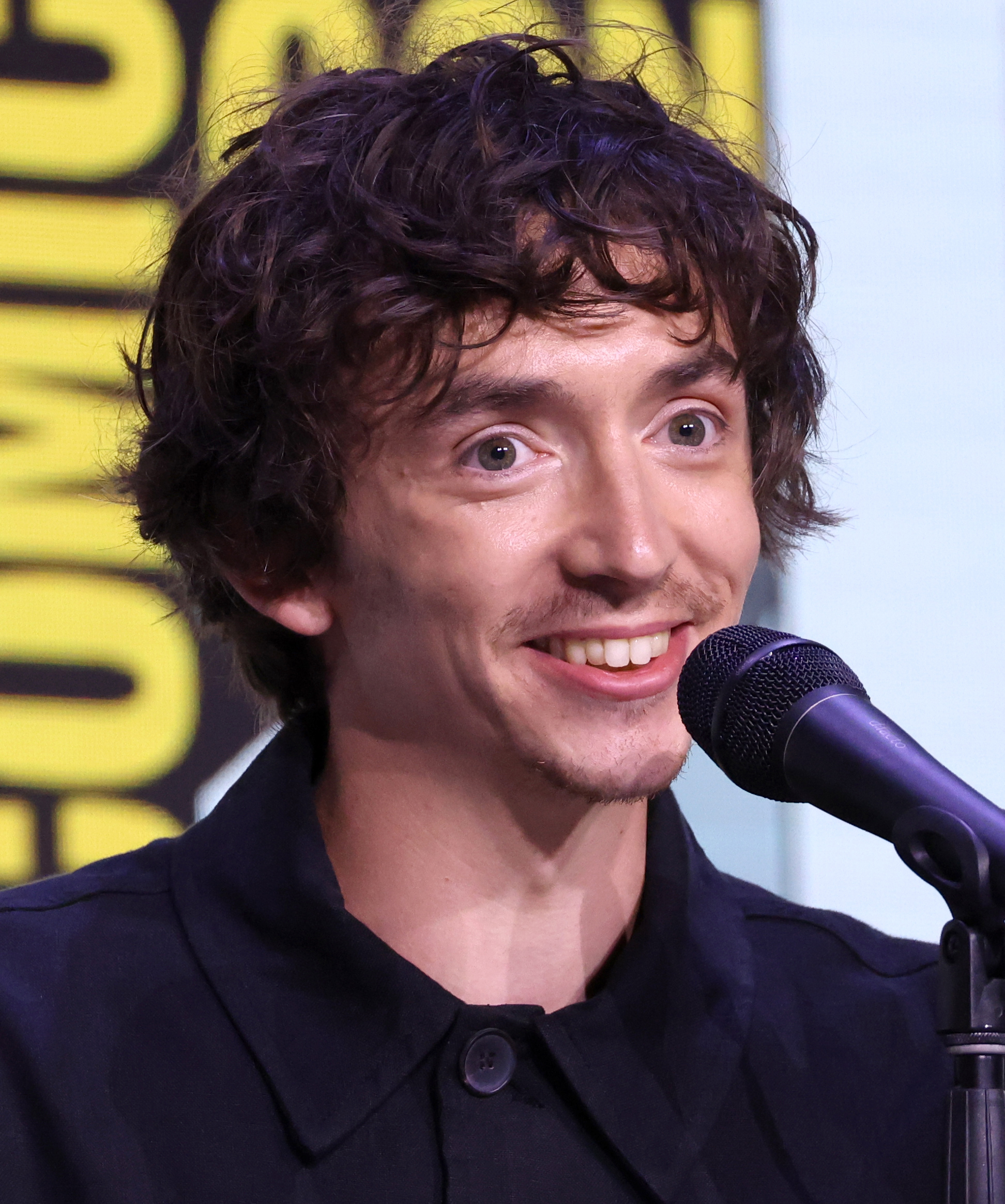
- Blenkin at the 2025 San Diego Comic-Con
- Born: 1996 (age 29–30); England
- Education: Guildhall School of Music and Drama
- Occupation: Actor
- Years active: 2017–present

Samuel Blenkin (born 1996) is an English actor. He gained prominence portraying Scorpius Malfoy in the West End production of Harry Potter and the Cursed Child (2017–2018) and has appeared in series such as Peaky Blinders (2019), Atlanta (2022), Black Mirror (2023) and Alien: Earth (2025). Blenkin plays Prince Hamlet in Hamlet Hail to the Thief, a production of Hamlet featuring music from the 2003 Radiohead album Hail to the Thief that opened in 2025.

== Early life and education ==
Blenkin was born in 1996, and grew up in Tewkesbury, Gloucestershire. After auditioning for several drama schools, he was accepted to the Guildhall School of Music and Drama when he was 18. During his studies, he was cast as Scorpius Malfoy in Harry Potter and the Cursed Child, which marked his professional stage debut, and graduated in 2017. He is also a member of the National Youth Theatre.

== Career ==
In 2017, Blenkin began his professional acting career by taking over the role of Scorpius Malfoy in the West End production of Harry Potter and the Cursed Child at the Palace Theatre in London.

He appeared in the critically acclaimed series Peaky Blinders in 2019, portraying Adam Parker. In 2020, Blenkin had a role in the BBC-Netflix series Dracula as Piotr in the episode "Blood Vessel". He also starred in The Sandman as Will Shaxberd.

In 2023, Blenkin played Thomas Caine in The Continental: From the World of John Wick, a prequel series to the John Wick franchise. The same year, he appeared in Black Mirror, playing Davis McCardle in the episode "Loch Henry".

In 2024, Blenkin portrayed Prince Charles in the miniseries Mary & George, which explored the life of Mary Villiers. He appeared in the FX series Alien: Earth, portraying Boy Kavalier, which was released on 12 August 2025. Blenkin plays Prince Hamlet in Hamlet Hail to the Thief, a production of Hamlet featuring music from the 2003 Radiohead album Hail to the Thief. It was produced by the Royal Shakespeare Company and opened in 2025. He repeated the role at the Barbican Centre from Halloween 2026 to January 2027.

== Personal life ==
Blenkin is involved in music. He has performed alternative folk songs exploring themes of love, loss, and the apocalypse. As of August 2025, he was single and is focused on his career. He has a younger brother.

== Filmography ==
=== Film ===
Year	Title	Role	Notes
2020	Misbehaviour	Lawrence	
2021	The French Dispatch	Cadet #4	
2025	Mickey 17	Delinquent Borrower	

=== Television ===
Year	Title	Role	Notes
2018	Doctors	Jamie McCain	Episode: "The Importance of Being Allergic"
2019	Grantchester	Adam Carter	Episode #4.6
2019	Pennyworth	Jack Wild	2 episodes
2019	Peaky Blinders	Adam Parker	2 episodes
2020	Dracula	Piotr	Episode: "Blood Vessel"
2022	Atlanta	Wiley	Episode: "Cancer Attack"
2022	The Sandman	Will Shaxberd	Episode: "The Sound of Her Wings"
2022	The Witcher: Blood Origin	Avallac'h	3 episodes
2023	The Continental: From the World of John Wick	Thomas Caine	Episode: "Loyalty to the Master"
2023	Black Mirror	Davis McCardle	Episode: "Loch Henry"
2024	Mary & George	Prince Charles	Miniseries
2025	Alien: Earth	Boy Kavalier	8 episodes

== Theatre ==
Year	Title	Role	Venue	Notes
2017–2018	Harry Potter and the Cursed Child	Scorpius Malfoy	Palace Theatre, London	West End production
2025–2026	Hamlet Hail to the Thief	Prince Hamlet	Royal Shakespeare Theatre, Stratford upon Avon	A collaboration with Radiohead's Thom Yorke
2026–2027	Hamlet Hail to the Thief	Prince Hamlet	Barbican Centre, London	A collaboration with Radiohead's Thom Yorke
