= Sue Me =

Sue Me or So Sue Me may refer to:

== Songs ==
- "Sue Me" (Audrey Hobert song), 2025
- "Sue Me" (Guys and Dolls song), song written by Frank Loesser from Guys and Dolls, 1950
- "Sue Me" (Sabrina Carpenter song), 2018
- "Sue Me", a song by Kurt Nilsen from album I, 2003
- "Sue Me", a single by Korean group Bastarz and Groovy Room, 2015
- "Sue Me", a song by Björk from Utopia, 2017
- "Sue Me", a song by Wale from Wow... That's Crazy, 2019
- "So Sue Me", a song by M.O.T. from 19.99
- "So Sue Me", a song by John Scofield from Time on My Hands
- "So Sue Me", a song by The Young Knives from The Young Knives ...Are Dead ...And Some
- "So Sue Me", a song by Polara from C'est la Vie

== Misc ==
- Sosumi, an alert noise by Apple whose name is a pun on the phrase "so, sue me!"
- So Sue Me! Cartoons on the Law, a cartoon collection by Sidney Harris
- "So Sue Me", a recurring segment on Fox & Friends
- So Sue Me, an episode of Snake Tales
- So, Sue Me, a play by Arthur Yorinks

== See also ==
- Sue Me, Sue You Blues, a song by George Harrison, 1972
- Su-mi, a Korean given name
- Say Sue Me
