= Sick Octave =

Studio album by Young Knives
- Released: 21 April 2013
- Recorded: Stud Studios, Kent; Wincraft Studios, Gloucestershire
- Genre: Experimental rock, post-punk revival
- Label: Gadzook
- Producer: Young Knives

Young Knives chronology
Ornaments from the Silver Arcade (2011)	Sick Octave (2013)	Barbarians (2020)

Professional ratings
Review scores
Source	Rating
Clash	(8/10)
Drowned In Sound	(6/10)
Mojo	4/5 stars
NME	(8/10)

Sick Octave is the fourth full-length album by Young Knives, released in the United Kingdom on 21 April 2013 on the Gadzook label.

The creation of Sick Octave marked a departure from the band's previous releases. Seeking more independence and creative freedom, they renovated their rehearsal space at Henry Dartnall's home in Oxford into a fully-functioning recording studio, coupled with the desire to experiment and expand their sound.

== Track listing ==
1. "12345" – 0:26
2. "Owls of Athens" – 3:55
3. "We Could Be Blood" – 2:55
4. "All Tied Up" – 5:37
5. "White Sands" – 4:00
6. "Something Awful" – 5:15
7. "Preset Columns/Default Comets" – 3:32
8. "Bella Bella" – 4:55
9. "Marble Maze" – 4:00
10. "Green Island Red Raw" – 3:22
11. "Score" – 1:05
12. "Bed Warmer" – 5:10
13. "Maureen" – 4:05
