= 2 + 2 = 5 (song) =

2003 single by Radiohead

Single by Radiohead

from the album Hail to the Thief
- Released: 17 November 2003
- Genre: Alternative rock; art rock; post-punk
- Length: 3:21
- Label: Parlophone
- Songwriter: Radiohead
- Producers: Nigel Godrich; Radiohead

Radiohead singles chronology
"Go to Sleep" (2003)	"2 + 2 = 5" (2003)	"Jigsaw Falling into Place" (2008)

Licensed audio
- "2 + 2 = 5" on YouTube

"2 + 2 = 5" is a song by the English rock band Radiohead, released as the third and final single from their sixth studio album, Hail to the Thief (2003), on 17 November 2003. It references the slogan "two plus two equals five" from the 1949 dystopian novel Nineteen Eighty-Four by George Orwell.

"2 + 2 = 5" reached number two in Canada, number 12 in Italy and number 15 in the UK. A live version recorded at Earl's Court, London, was included on the 2004 EP Com Lag and the 2025 album Hail to the Thief (Live Recordings 2003–2009).

== Recording ==
"2 + 2 = 5" was recorded in 2002 at Ocean Way Recording studios in Hollywood, Los Angeles, with the producer Nigel Godrich. It was recorded as a studio test and finished in two hours. Before the song begins, Jonny Greenwood is heard plugging in his guitar; the singer, Thom Yorke, responds: "That's a nice way to start, Jonny."

== Music and lyrics ==
"2 + 2 = 5" is a rock song that builds to a loud climax. It begins with a sequenced drum pattern, a guitar arpeggio in ^{7}_{8}, and reverberating pops created by Ed O'Brien playing above the fretboard. Greenwood plays in drop D tuning.

"2 + 2 = 5" references the slogan "two plus two equals five" from the 1949 dystopian novel Nineteen Eighty-Four by George Orwell. The alternative title, "The Lukewarm", references Dante's Inferno, in which the "lukewarm" are those in hell who did nothing wrong but did not oppose wrongdoing.

Yorke sings that those who try to change the world are dreamers, but that "two and two always makes up five", indicating that he lives in a world without logic. In the second half, drums and guitars enter and Yorke sings "you have not been paying attention". Another lyric, "hail to the thief", was a phrase used in protests against George W. Bush as a play on "Hail to the Chief", the American presidential anthem.

== Release ==
"2 + 2 = 5" was released as the third single from Hail to the Thief on 17 November, 2003. The B-sides comprise a demo of "There There", a remix of "Myxomatosis" by Cristian Vogel, a remix of "Scatterbrain" by Four Tet and an alternative version of "I Will" recorded at Ocean Way Recording.

"2 + 2 = 5" was included in Radiohead: The Best Of (2008). A live version recorded at Earl's Court, London, was included on the 2004 EP Com Lag and the 2025 album Hail to the Thief (Live Recordings 2003–2009). In 2020, the Guardian named the live version of "2 + 2 = 5" the 31st-greatest Radiohead song, writing that it was a "polemical anthem for the era of mass-broadcast deception and enhanced interrogation techniques".

== Track listings ==
UK CD1 (CDR 6623)

1. "2 + 2 = 5" – 3:19
2. "Remyxomatosis" (Cristian Vogel RMX) – 5:07
3. "There There" (first demo) – 7:43

UK CD2 (CDRS 6623)

1. "2 + 2 = 5" – 3:19
2. "Skttrbrain" (Four Tet remix) – 4:26
3. "I Will" (Los Angeles version) – 2:14

UK DVD single (DVDR 6623)

1. "2 + 2 = 5" – 3:19
2. "Sit Down Stand Up" (Ed Holdsworth's video)
3. "The Most Gigantic Lying Mouth of All Time" (excerpt)

== Personnel ==
Radiohead
- Thom Yorke
- Jonny Greenwood
- Colin Greenwood
- Ed O'Brien
- Philip Selway
Additional personnel
- Nigel Godrich – production
- Darrell Thorp – engineering
- Stanley Donwood – artwork

== Charts ==
Chart (2003–2004)	Peak position
Australia (ARIA)	54
Canada (Nielsen SoundScan)	2
France (SNEP)	64
Ireland (IRMA)	36
Italy (FIMI)	12
Netherlands (Single Top 100)	99
Scottish Singles Sales (Official Charts)	26
UK Singles (Official Charts)	15

== Release history ==
Region	Date	Format(s)	Label(s)	Ref.
United Kingdom	17 November 2003	CD; DVD	Parlophone	
Australia	24 November 2003	CD	Parlophone	

== See also ==
- Com Lag (2plus2isfive) EP (2004)
