= The Young Knives... Are Dead =

The Young Knives...Are Dead

Studio album by The Young Knives
- Released: 21 October 2002
- Recorded: 2002
- Genre: Indie rock, post-punk revival
- Length: 22:38
- Label: Shifty Disco
- Producer: Brett Gordon, Chuck Rocks & John Halliday

The Young Knives chronology
| The Young Knives...Are Dead (2002) | Voices of Animals and Men (2006) |

Professional ratings
Review scores
| Source | Rating |
|---|---|
| NME | (7/10) |

The Young Knives...Are Dead is a mini-album containing seven songs by The Young Knives, and was released through the independent record label Shifty Disco in 2002. It is notably more raw and aggressive than their later work.

== Track listing ==
1. "Walking on the Autobahn" – 2:52
2. "English Rose" – 3:06
3. "John" – 2:55
4. "The Night of the Trees" – 2:30
5. "Grand Opening" – 3:41
6. "Working Hands" – 3:04
7. "Diamonds in the West" – 4:30

== Personnel ==
- Henry Dartnall – vocals, guitar
- The House of Lords (Thomas Dartnall) – bass guitar, vocals
- Oliver Askew – drums
