= Su-mi =

- Hangul: 수미
- RR: Sumi
- MR: Sumi
- IPA: [sumi]

Su-mi, also spelled Soo-mi, is a Korean given name.

People with this name include:

- Kim Soo-mi (born Kim Young-ok, 1951), South Korean actress
- Sumi Jo (born 1962), South Korean lyric coloratura soprano
- Sue Mi Terry (Korean name Kim Sue-mi, born c. 1972), American intelligence analyst
- Sumi Hwang (born 1986), South Korean soprano
- Lee Seo-an (born 1989), South Korean singer, former member of SeeYa, F-ve Dolls, and Coed School
- Shin Su-mi (fl. 2000s), pen name Shin Ji-sang, South Korean manhwa artist

Fictional characters with this name include:

- Bae Su-mi, in 2003 South Korean film A Tale of Two Sisters
- Choi Soo-mi, in 2012 South Korean television series Man from the Equator

== See also ==
- List of Korean given names
- Sue Me (disambiguation)
