= She's Attracted To =

Single by Young Knives

from the album Voices of Animals and Men
- Released: 19 June 2006
- Genre: Indie rock
- Length: 3:06
- Label: Transgressive Records
- Songwriter(s): Henry Dartnall, Thomas Dartnall, Oliver Askew

Young Knives singles chronology
"Here Comes the Rumour Mill" (2006)	"She's Attracted To" (2006)	"Weekends and Bleak Days (Hot Summer)" (2006)

"She's Attracted To" is a song by English indie rock band Young Knives and is featured on their second studio album, Voices of Animals and Men. The third single taken from the album, it was released on 19 June 2006 and reached a peak position of #38 in the UK Singles Chart.

== Track listing ==
CD:

1. "She's Attracted To" – 3:06
2. "Two Places"

== Charts ==
Chart (2006)	Position
UK Singles (OCC)	38
