= The Samurai Seven =

English indie music group

- Origin: Oxford, England
- Genre: Indie pop punk
- Works: Le Sport
- Years active: 1997 - present
- Labels: Shifty Disco, Rotator Records
- Members: Simon Williams, Matt Williams, Jimmy Martin, Chris Hayward

The Samurai Seven is an indie punk music group from Oxford, England. Initially active from 1997, the band achieved critical attention and significant airplay on BBC Radio, until a shooting incident injured the band's lead singer and songwriter. As of 2026 the band is active releasing music and playing live.

== History ==
The Samurai Seven are Simon Williams (vocals and guitar), Matt Williams (vocals and guitar), Jimmy Martin (bass), and Chris Hayward (drums). Having formed in 1997 in Oxford, The Samurai Seven rose to prominence during that year’s Radio One Oxford Sound City event, garnering attention from both John Peel and Steve Lamacq. The band recorded five Peel Sessions at London’s Maida Vale Studios for BBC Radio 1, as well as recording the theme tune to John Peel’s Channel Four TV show, “Sounds of the Suburbs”.

They gained critical attention from the music press, releasing debut single "Xeroxy Music" in June 1998 on Shifty Disco. The band's trajectory was curtailed after singer Simon Williams was injured in the eye in a drive-by airgun shooting incident in Oxford on Valentine's Night 1999, resulting in a one-year hiatus. They regrouped, and in 2002 released debut album Le Sport on Rotator Records, but did not reacquire their previous momentum. Drummer Hayward left the group in 2004, replaced by Alain Lotter, and subsequently the band ceased working together.

The band regrouped in 2025 on the original line-up, and in 2026 released their first single in c. 25 years, "Punching Down". The track was recorded with producer Hugo Nicolson at Runway Studios, and mixed at Fairport Convention’s Woodworm studios in Oxfordshire.

The four-piece has been described by the Oxford Mail as a "legendary" punk pop group, and Tim Perry writing for The Independent called them "smart-suited, fast-riffing indie types with a fine line in harmonies".

== Discography ==
=== Singles/EPs ===
- "Xeroxy Music" (DISCO9806 Shifty Disco, June 1998)
- “Amateur Photographer” (NING063 Fierce Panda, November 1998)
- “What Have I Said Now?” (PLASTIC007 Plastic Cowboy, 2000)
- "Lucky Pierre" (RRSD121 Rotator Records, 2002)
- "Punching Down" (May 2026)
- "Duck and Cover" (July 2026)
- "Make It Real EP" (September 2026)
- "¡Dios Mío!" (November 2026)

=== Albums ===
- Le Sport (RRAD122 Rotator Records, 2002)
- Le Sport (BDLS-006LP Boundless Records, March 2003)

=== Compilations ===
- “Xeroxy Music” on It’s a Shifty Disco Thing Volume Two (Shifty Disco, 1998)
- “Bonnet” on Snakebite City Nine (Bluefire Records, 1999)
- "The Sound of the Suburbs" on John Peel's Sounds Of The Suburbs (Shifty Disco, 1999)
- “Nunnery” on Truck 2001: Abandon Your Car (Truck Records, 2001)
- "Xeroxy Music" on 0-60 in Five Years: the Complete Shifty Disco Singles Collection (Shifty Disco, 2002)
- “Flaming Hell Blake (Alt Version)” on Planet Of The Popboomerang (Pop Boomerang, 2003)
- “Screw You Jack” on International Pop Overthrow: Volume 8 (Not Lame, 2005)
- “Xeroxy Music” on Kats Karavan - The History of John Peel on the Radio (Universal Music, 2009)
