= Hamlet Hail to the Thief =

2025 Hamlet production with Radiohead

- Written by: William Shakespeare
- Music by: Radiohead
- Genre: Shakespearean tragedy

Premiere
- Date: 27 April 2025
- Place: Aviva Studios, Manchester
- Directed by: Christine Jones and Steven Hoggett
- Original run: 27 April — 18 May 2025
- Official website

Hamlet Hail to the Thief is a production of the William Shakespeare play Hamlet featuring music from the 2003 Radiohead album Hail to the Thief. It first ran at Aviva Studios in Manchester in April 2025. It is produced by the Royal Shakespeare Company and directed by Christine Jones and Steven Hoggett, and stars Samuel Blenkin as Prince Hamlet. The music was arranged by the Radiohead singer and songwriter, Thom Yorke.

== Production ==
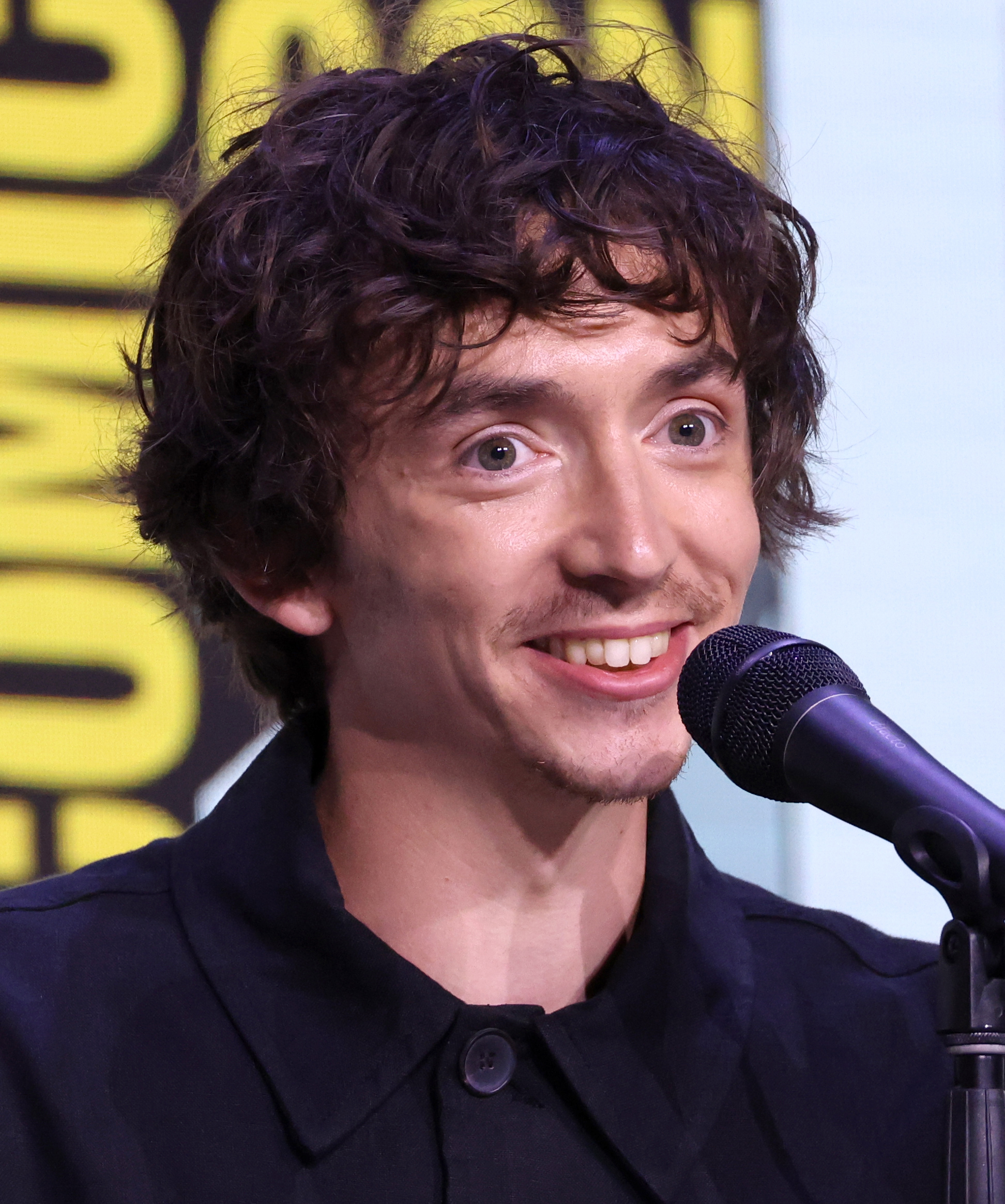
Blenkin (pictured in 2025) plays Prince Hamlet.

Radiohead released their sixth album, Hail to the Thief, in 2003. The singer and songwriter, Thom Yorke, wrote many of its lyrics in response to the war on terror and the resurgence of right-wing politics in the west after the turn of the millennium. The theatre director Christine Jones noticed similarities to the William Shakespeare play Hamlet: "Both look at the complexity of what it is to be human, to delude yourself and to be deluded by your government. To find your moral compass within the world."

Jones approached Yorke with the idea of adapting Hail to the Thief into a production of Hamlet. Yorke denied that Radiohead had Hamlet in mind when writing Hail to the Thief, but found it a fascinating parallel. He felt the album "chimes with the underlying grief and paranoia" of Hamlet.

Yorke reworked the songs the play. He said this had been a "healthy" way for Radiohead to revisit the album, which they felt unsatisfied with, and "claim back the original sentiment". He decided that performing the songs in their entirety would not fit, and instead broke them into fragments. In the process, Yorke revisited Radiohead's live performances of Hail to the Thief songs. A selection was released in 2025 as Hail to the Thief (Live Recordings 2003–2009).

The production is directed by Jones with Steven Hoggett. It stars Samuel Blenkin as Prince Hamlet. The music was performed by a five-piece band isolated in sound booths. Rolling Stone described the set design as "somewhere between a recording studio, a sound testing chamber and an interrogation room". Jones cut the play to around 90 minutes.

== History ==
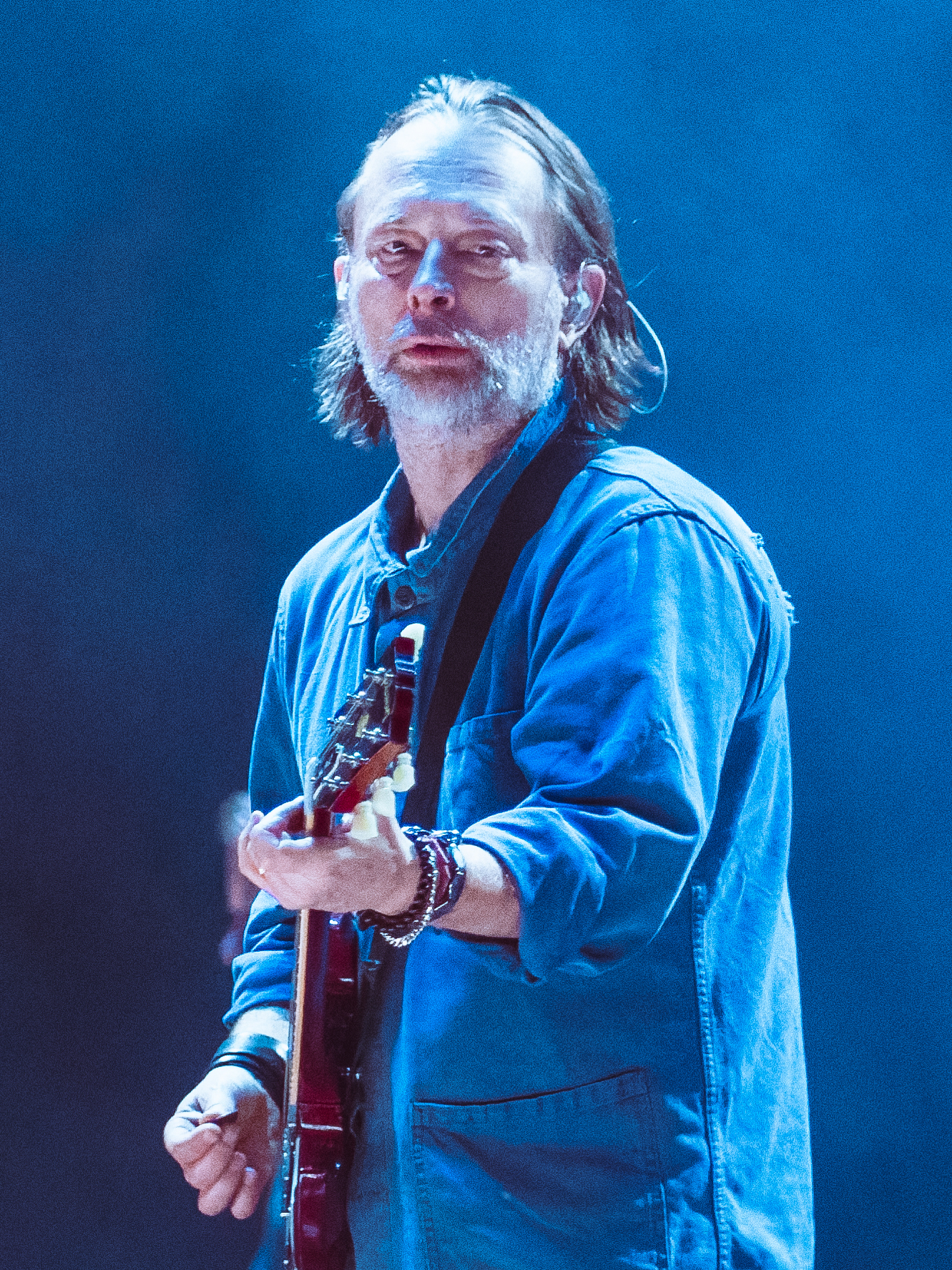
Yorke performing on the 2025 Radiohead tour

Hamlet Hail to the Thief opened at Aviva Studios, Manchester, and ran from 27 April to 18 May 2025. It then ran at the Royal Shakespeare Theatre in Stratford-upon-Avon from 4 to 28 June. It is due to run at the Barbican Centre, London, from October 31 2026 to January 23 2027.

== Reception ==
In The Guardian, Mark Fisher gave Hamlet Hail to the Thief four out of five, praising Yorke's arrangements and writing that it "works as a lucid, angsty revenge tragedy, played with clarity and verve". The Guardian critic Alexis Petridis gave it a positive review, writing: "If you want something to soundtrack a play in which ghosts and mental disarray figure heavily, the keening tone of Yorke's vocal melodies is pretty much perfect." Pitchfork described it as "an absorbing, heart-racing and thrilling production that gracefully utilises this music to co-exist within powerful dramatic depictions of grief, fear, madness, and death".

Time Out wrote that "Hamlet Hail to the Thief doesn't entirely make sense, but it is haunting, a journey into human darkness that's more visceral than articulated". The New York Times wrote that it was "a compelling spectacle", and that the singers provided "an ethereal beauty more than worthy of Yorke himself ... But it feels like a little Shakespeare has been added to Radiohead's music, rather than the other way around. The production can take a place in the pantheon of flawed but worthwhile undertakings, like those bloated concept albums of the 1970s that were forerunners to Hail to the Thief."
