= Ornaments from the Silver Arcade =

Studio album by Young Knives
- Released: 4 April 2011
- Recorded: Seedy Belly Studios, Los Angeles
- Genre: Indie rock, post-punk revival
- Label: Gadzook
- Producer: Nick Launay

Young Knives chronology
Superabundance (2008)	Ornaments from the Silver Arcade (2011)	Sick Octave (2013)

Singles from Ornaments from the Silver Arcade
- 1. "Love My Name" Released: 21 March 2011; 2. "Human Again" Released: 30 May 2011; 3. "Vision in Rags" Released: 12 September 2011

Professional ratings
Review scores
Source	Rating
BBC	(positive)
Drowned In Sound	(6/10)
The Fly	3.5/5 stars
Gigwise	4/5 stars
Kerrang! Radio	(positive)
Mojo	3/5 stars
MusicOMH	2/5 stars
NME	(4/10)
Q	4/5 stars

Ornaments from the Silver Arcade is the third full-length album by Young Knives, released in the United Kingdom on 4 April 2011 on the Gadzook label.

The track "Love My Name" was released as a single on 14 March 2011.

== Track listing ==
1. "Love My Name" – 3:14
2. "Woman" – 3:47
3. "Everything Falls Into Place" – 3:05
4. "Human Again" – 3:41
5. "Running from a Standing Start" – 3:11
6. "Sister Frideswide" – 3:58
7. "Vision in Rags" – 3:29
8. "Go to Ground" – 3:59
9. "Silver Tongue" – 3:39
10. "Storm Clouds" – 2:33
11. "Glasshouse" – 4:50

=== iTunes bonus track ===
1. "Her Pearls" - 3:08
