= Go to Sleep =

2003 single by Radiohead

Single by Radiohead

from the album Hail to the Thief
- B-side: "I Am Citizen Insane"; "Gagging Order"; "I Am a Wicked Child"; "Fog (Again)" (Live)
- Released: 18 August 2003
- Genre: Alternative rock
- Length: 3:21
- Label: Parlophone; Capitol
- Songwriter: Radiohead
- Producers: Nigel Godrich; Radiohead

Radiohead singles chronology
"There There" (2003)	"Go to Sleep" (2003)	"2 + 2 = 5" (2003)

Music video
- "Go to Sleep" on YouTube

"Go to Sleep" is a song by the English rock band Radiohead, released as the second single from their sixth studio album, Hail to the Thief (2003), on 18 August 2003. It reached number two in Canada, number nine in Italy and number 12 in the UK.

== Composition ==
The first part of "Go to Sleep" is composed in alternating bars of 4/4 and 12/8. It features a processed "stuttering" guitar sound created by Jonny Greenwood.

== Music video ==
A CGI music video was directed by Alex Rutterford. It depicts the singer, Thom Yorke, sitting in a park while people in business suits walk by rapidly. The classical buildings crumble and reassemble in modern style.

== Release ==
"Go to Sleep" was released as the second single from Radiohead's sixth studio album, Hail to the Thief (2003), on 18 August 2003. In 2023, Rolling Stone said it was not an appropriate choice of single but that EMI had wanted to "retrench Radiohead as a big rock band" to compete with acts such as Coldplay and Muse.

Radiohead released a live version, recorded in Osaka, for the War Child charity in 2004. Another live version was released on the 2025 album Hail to the Thief (Live Recordings 2003–2009).

== Track listings ==
=== UK versions ===
CD 1 CDR6613

1. "Go to Sleep" - 3:23
2. "I Am Citizen Insane" - 3:31
3. "Fog (Again)" (Live) - 2:17

CD 2 CDRS6613

1. "Go to Sleep" - 3:23
2. "Gagging Order" - 3:35
3. "I Am a Wicked Child" - 3:05

12" 12R6613

1. "Go to Sleep" - 3:23
2. "I Am Citizen Insane" - 3:32
3. "I Am a Wicked Child" - 3:35

=== US version ===
CD 52953 released 3 September 2003 by Capitol Records

1. "Go to Sleep" - 3:23
2. "Gagging Order" - 3:35
3. "I Am a Wicked Child" - 3:07

7" R-19218

1. "Go to Sleep" - 3:21
2. "I Am Citizen Insane" - 3:30

=== Canada version ===
CD 1 52954

1. "Go to Sleep" - 3:23
2. "I Am Citizen Insane" - 3:35
3. "Fog (Again)" (Live) - 2:17

CD 2 52955

1. "Go to Sleep" - 3:23
2. "Gagging Order" - 3:35
3. "I Am a Wicked Child" - 3:07

== Personnel ==
- Thom Yorke – vocals, guitar
- Jonny Greenwood – guitar, laptop, toy piano
- Ed O'Brien – guitar, backing vocals
- Colin Greenwood – bass
- Philip Selway – drums

== Charts ==
Chart (2003)	Peak position
Australia (ARIA)	39
Belgium (Ultratip Bubbling Under Wallonia)	10
Canada (Nielsen SoundScan)	2
Denmark (Tracklisten)	11
Finland (Suomen virallinen lista)	14
France (SNEP)	87
Germany (GfK)	82
Ireland (IRMA)	11
Italy (FIMI)	9
Netherlands (Single Top 100)	55
Scotland Singles (Official Charts)	10
Switzerland (Schweizer Hitparade)	90
UK Singles (Official Charts)	12
UK Rock & Metal (Official Charts)	2
US Modern Rock Tracks (Billboard)	32

== Release history ==
Region	Date	Format(s)	Label(s)	Ref.
United Kingdom	18 August 2003	12-inch vinyl; CD	Parlophone	
United States	18 August 2003	Triple A; alternative radio	Capitol	
Australia	1 September 2003	12-inch vinyl; CD	Parlophone	
