= There There (song) =

2003 single by Radiohead

"There, There"

Single by Radiohead

from the album Hail to the Thief
- B-side: "Paperbag Writer"; "Where Bluebirds Fly"
- Released: 21 May 2003
- Genre: Alternative rock
- Length: 5:23
- Label: Parlophone
- Songwriter: Radiohead
- Producers: Nigel Godrich; Radiohead

Radiohead singles chronology
"Knives Out" (2001)	"There, There" (2003)	"Go to Sleep" (2003)

Music video
- "There, There" on YouTube

"There, There (The Boney King of Nowhere)" is a song by the English rock band Radiohead, released on 21 May 2003 as the lead single from their sixth album, Hail to the Thief. It was influenced by Can, Siouxsie and the Banshees and the Pixies, with layered percussion that builds to a climax.

"There, There" reached number four on the UK singles chart, number one in Canada and Portugal, and number 14 on the US Billboard Modern Rock Tracks chart. In 2025, Rolling Stone named it the 196th-greatest song of the 21st century so far. "There There" was included on Radiohead: The Best Of (2008), and a live version was released on the 2025 album Hail to the Thief (Live Recordings 2003–2009).

== Recording ==
Radiohead worked on "There, There" during the sessions for their fourth album, Kid A (2000). They recorded it for their sixth album, Hail to the Thief, with their longtime producer, Nigel Godrich. They recorded a version at Ocean Way in Los Angeles in 2002, but were not satisfied with the results. According to the guitarist Jonny Greenwood, "Sometimes it doesn't work at all, because you haven't got the real volume of a live concert ... That just doesn't really work coming out of speakers in your front room ... It just sounded a bit like we were trying to make a worthy 'live band playing together' recording."

The singer, Thom Yorke, feared Radiohead had lost the song. However, they returned to the UK and recorded an alternative version in their Oxfordshire studio. Yorke said he cried with relief when he heard Godrich's mix, saying he had dreamed of how he wanted the song to sound: "And one day you walk into the studio and there it is. But you've not been standing there with a hammer and trying to beat it out of the desk or your guitar, it's not necessary. It's just there one day."

A demo was released as the B-side to Radiohead's 2003 single "2 + 2 = 5". A live version was released on the 2025 album Hail to the Thief (Live Recordings 2003–2009).

== Composition ==
"There, There" is a rock song with layered percussion that builds to a loud climax. It was influenced by Can, Siouxsie and the Banshees and the Pixies. Yorke said the lyrics were "supposed to be comforting — 'It's alright, you're just imagining it.'" The subtitle "The Boney King of Nowhere" refers to a song from the animated series Bagpuss, which Yorke watched with his young son.

== Music video ==
Yorke asked Oliver Postgate, the creator of Bagpuss, to create the music video for "There, There", but Postgate declined as he was retired. Instead, a stop-motion-animated video was created by Chris Hopewell. Yorke instructed him to make a video similar to the folk tales of the Brothers Grimm and the Czech animator Jan Švankmajer. Hopewell described it as "fifties East European genre animation, overlaboured and naive". The video debuted on the Times Square Jumbotron in New York on 20 May 2003, and received hourly play that day on MTV2. In 2020, Greenwood said it was Radiohead's best video.

In the video, Yorke enters a forest and walks around a town consisting entirely of animals. He sees numerous events play out, such as a wedding, and finds a golden jacket and a pair of golden boots. He puts them on, awakening a group of crows, who chase and attack him. The boots give Yorke super speed, but the effect wears off when the crows fly away and his feet are trapped by growing vines. He breaks free, but the boots fall off. His feet become tree roots, and Yorke becomes a tree. The crows rest on the branches.

== Reception ==
"There, There" was released as the lead single from Hail to the Thief on 21 May 2003. The Guardian described the choice of a more conventional rock song as "diplomatic" following the divided response to Radiohead's previous albums Kid A and Amnesiac. The single reached number four on the UK singles chart and number one in Canada. It also received airplay on US modern rock stations, reaching number fourteen on the Hot Modern Rock Tracks chart, and was nominated for a Grammy Award for Best Rock Performance by a Duo or Group with Vocal. The music video won the MTV Video Music Award for Best Art Direction at the 2003 MTV Video Awards.

In 2020, the Guardian named "There, There" the 27th-greatest Radiohead song, writing that its "hooks and arrangement were deceptively crafty ... making its turbulent climax hard to shake". In 2025, Rolling Stone named it the 196th-greatest song of the 21st century so far. The editor Rob Sheffield wrote that "for some of us 'There, There' will always be the definitive Radiohead classic, the song you'd play for a visiting Martian who asked what this band was all about".

== Track listings ==
Standard CD and 12-inch single

1. "There, There" – 5:24
2. "Paperbag Writer" – 3:58
3. "Where Bluebirds Fly" – 4:31

7-inch single

1. "There, There" – 5:24
2. "Paperbag Writer" – 3:58

== Personnel ==
Radiohead

- Thom Yorke
- Jonny Greenwood
- Colin Greenwood
- Ed O'Brien
- Philip Selway

Additional personnel

- Nigel Godrich – production
- Darrell Thorp – engineering
- Stanley Donwood – artwork

== Charts ==
=== Weekly charts ===
Chart (2003)	Peak position
Australia (ARIA)	28
Belgium (Ultratip Bubbling Under Flanders)	16
Belgium (Ultratop 50 Wallonia)	39
Canada (Nielsen SoundScan)	1
Denmark (Tracklisten)	9
Europe (Eurochart Hot 100)	7
Finland (Suomen virallinen lista)	5
France (SNEP)	54
Germany (GfK)	67
Ireland (IRMA)	7
Italy (FIMI)	5
Japan (Oricon)	24
Netherlands (Dutch Top 40 Tipparade)	18
Netherlands (Single Top 100)	48
Norway (VG-lista)	8
Portugal (AFP)	1
Scottish Singles Sales (Official Charts)	4
Sweden (Sverigetopplistan)	39
Switzerland (Schweizer Hitparade)	76
UK Singles (Official Charts)	4
UK Rock & Metal (Official Charts)	1
US Alternative Airplay (Billboard)	14

=== Year-end charts ===
Chart (2003)	Position
UK Singles (OCC)	188

== Release history ==
Region	Date	Label	Format	Catalogue number	Ref.
Japan	21 May 2003	Parlophone	CD	TOCP-40161	
Australia	26 May 2003	Parlophone	CD	7243 5 52336 2 2	
United Kingdom	26 May 2003	Parlophone	CD	CDR 6608	
United Kingdom	26 May 2003	Parlophone	12-inch vinyl	R 6608	
