= Weekends and Bleak Days (Hot Summer) =

Single by Young Knives

from the album Voices of Animals and Men
- Released: 14 August 2006
- Genre: Indie rock
- Length: 2:47
- Label: Transgressive Records
- Songwriter(s): Henry Dartnall, Thomas Dartnall, Oliver Askew

Young Knives singles chronology
"She's Attracted To" (2006)	"Weekends and Bleak Days (Hot Summer)" (2006)	"The Decision" (2006)

"Weekends and Bleak Days (Hot Summer)" is a song by English indie rock band Young Knives and is featured on their second studio album, Voices of Animals and Men. The fourth single taken from the album, it was released on 14 August 2006 and reached a peak position of #35 in the UK Singles Chart.

== Charts ==
Chart (2006)	Position
UK Singles (OCC)	35
