= Voices of Animals and Men =

Studio album by the Young Knives
- Released: 21 August 2006
- Genres: Indie rock, post-punk revival
- Length: 44:41
- Label: Transgressive Records
- Producer: Andy Gill

The Young Knives chronology
The Young Knives... Are Dead (2002)	Voices of Animals and Men (2006)	Superabundance (2008)

Singles from Voices of Animals and Men
- 1. "The Decision" Released: 21 November 2005; re-issued 30 October 2006; 2. "Here Comes the Rumour Mill" Released: 20 February 2006; 3. "She's Attracted To" Released: 19 June 2006; 4. "Weekends and Bleak Days (Hot Summer)" Released: 14 August 2006

Professional ratings
Review scores
Source	Rating
AllMusic	3/5 stars
Drowned in Sound	(8/10)
Guardian	4/5 stars
NME	(7/10)
The Observer	5/5 stars
Pitchfork	(7.3/10)
PlayLouder	4/5 stars
PopMatters	(4/10)

Voices of Animals and Men is the first full-length album by the Young Knives, released on 21 August 2006. The album's title is a reference to the Adam and the Ants song "Animals and Men", which is in turn a reference to the Futurists. The cover features a figure made of straw, a reference to the Whittlesey Straw Bear Festival.

The album was nominated for the 2007 Mercury Music Prize.

== Track listing ==
1. "Part Timer" – 2:54
2. "The Decision" – 3:23
3. "Weekends and Bleak Days (Hot Summer)" – 2:47
4. "In the Pink" – 3:16
5. "Mystic Energy" – 2:52
6. "Here Comes the Rumour Mill" – 3:34
7. "Tailors" – 4:11
8. "Half Timer" – 1:39
9. "She's Attracted To" – 3:06
10. "Dialling Darling" – 2:59
11. "Another Hollow Line" – 3:42
12. "Coastguard" – 3:01
13. "Loughborough Suicide" – 3:56
14. "Tremblings of Trails" – 3:21

== Charts ==
=== Album ===
Chart (2006)	Peak position
UK Albums Chart	21

=== Singles ===
The band's first single, "The Decision", was included on the album. It was originally released on 21 November 2005 and did not chart. However, it was reissued on 30 October 2006 (with "Brochures" on the B-side instead of "Big Red Rope", which was on the original single) and reached a peak position of no. 60 on the UK Singles Chart.

Year	Song	Peak position (UK)
2005	"The Decision"	–
2006	"Here Comes The Rumour Mill"	36
2006	"She's Attracted To"	38
2006	"Weekends And Bleak Days (Hot Summer)"	35
2006	"The Decision"	60

== Special editions ==
=== Bonus DVD ===
- Live performances:
  - "Kramer vs Kramer"
  - "Kitchener"
  - "She's Attracted To"
  - "Another Hollow Line"
  - "Weekends And Bleak Days"
- Videos:
  - "The Decision"
  - "Here Comes The Rumour Mill"
  - "She's Attracted To"
  - "Weekends And Bleak Days"
- Band videos:
  - "Weekends And Bleak Days" (Original Video)
  - "We Are The Also Rans" (Band Video)
  - "She's Attracted To" (Acoustic)
  - "Another Hollow Line" (Morris Dancer's Edit)
  - "Part Timer" (Short Film)
