= Shifty Disco =

- Founded: January 1997
- Status: Inactive
- Genre: Various
- Country of origin: United Kingdom
- Location: Oxford, England
- Official website: ShiftyDisco.co.uk

Shifty Disco was a British independent record label based in Oxford, England.

The record label was started by local enthusiasts in January 1997 and their early releases were often featured by John Peel on his BBC Radio 1 show. Shifty Disco has released recordings by artists such as Beulah, Mark Gardener, Unbelievable Truth, The Samurai Seven, and Young Knives.

One of Shifty Disco's early, defining initiatives was the Shifty Disco singles club which released a new single every month to subscribers. A compilation of all the Singles Club releases was released as a 5-CD set in 2002: 0-60 in Five Years – The Complete Shifty Disco Singles Club Collection.

== See also ==
- The Barfly
