= Field Day Festival (2003) =

Field Day Festival was a music festival held at Giants Stadium in East Rutherford, New Jersey on June 7, 2003. Headlining bands were Radiohead and Beastie Boys. The festival was planned as a two-day event in Calverton, Long Island, New York. Due to conflicts with local police departments over providing security for the event, Suffolk County refused permission for the festival. It was relocated at the last minute to Giants Stadium and changed to a one-day event. The organizers issued refunds to original ticket holders and sold new tickets.
