= Superabundance (album) =

Studio album by Young Knives
- Released: 10 March 2008
- Studio: Castle of Doom Studios (Glasgow, Scotland)
- Genre: Indie rock, post-punk revival
- Length: 47:58
- Label: Transgressive Records
- Producer: Tony Doogan

Young Knives chronology
Voices of Animals and Men (2006)	Superabundance (2008)	Ornaments from the Silver Arcade (2011)

Singles from Superabundance
- 1. "Terra Firma" Released: 29 November 2007; 2. "Up All Night" Released: 25 February 2008; 3. "Turn Tail" Released: 19 May 2008; 4. "Dyed in the Wool" Released: 1 September 2008

Professional ratings
Review scores
Source	Rating
AllMusic	4/5 stars
Drowned in Sound	7/10
The Guardian	4/5 stars
Mojo	4/5 stars
NME	5/10
The Observer	4/5 stars
Pitchfork	6.6/10
Q	4/5 stars
The Times	4/5 stars
Uncut	4/5 stars

Superabundance is the second full-length album by Young Knives, released in the United Kingdom on 10 March 2008. The album reached number twenty-eight in the UK Albums Chart.

The tracks "Terra Firma" and "Up All Night" were released as singles prior to the album launch. "Turn Tail" was the next single released on 19 May 2008.

The closing track "Current of the River" is a re-recorded version of the B-side to "She's Attracted To".

The cover of the album was made in London. 17-year-old Brant Dryver, a stunt rider from the Moto-Stunts International team, did the burn out stunt on the bike. The photographer wanted smoke and fire from the tyre so the bike's rear wheel needed to be placed on wood so it could burn.

== Track listing ==
1. "Fit 4 U" – 3:16
2. "Terra Firma" – 2:48
3. "Up All Night" – 2:58
4. "Counters" – 4:11
5. "Light Switch" – 3:47
6. "Turn Tail" – 4:44
7. "I Can Hardly See Them" – 3:07
8. "Dyed in the Wool" – 3:10
9. "Rue the Days" – 3:46
10. "Flies" – 1:39
11. "Mummy Light the Fire" – 4:04
12. "Current of the River" – 5:24
  - "Long Cool Drinks by the Pool" - 3:10 (following 2 minutes of silence after "Current of the River")
- The US edition of the album also contains the b-sides of the "Terra Firma" and "Up All Night" singles.

== Charts ==
=== Album ===
Chart (2008)	Peak position
UK Albums Chart	28

=== Singles ===
Year	Song	Peak position (UK)
2007	"Terra Firma"	43
2008	"Up All Night"	45
2008	"Turn Tail"	

== Special editions ==
=== Bonus DVD ===
A CD and DVD version is available featuring videos made by the band for each track of the album.

=== Special 7" single ===
A special acoustic version of "Turn Tail" was released on vinyl on 19 May 2008. The version was recorded directly onto vinyl in one take, at Westbourne Studios in London. This process is not believed to have been undertaken commercially since the 1970s by Warsaw Pakt.
