= Young Knives =

English indie rock band

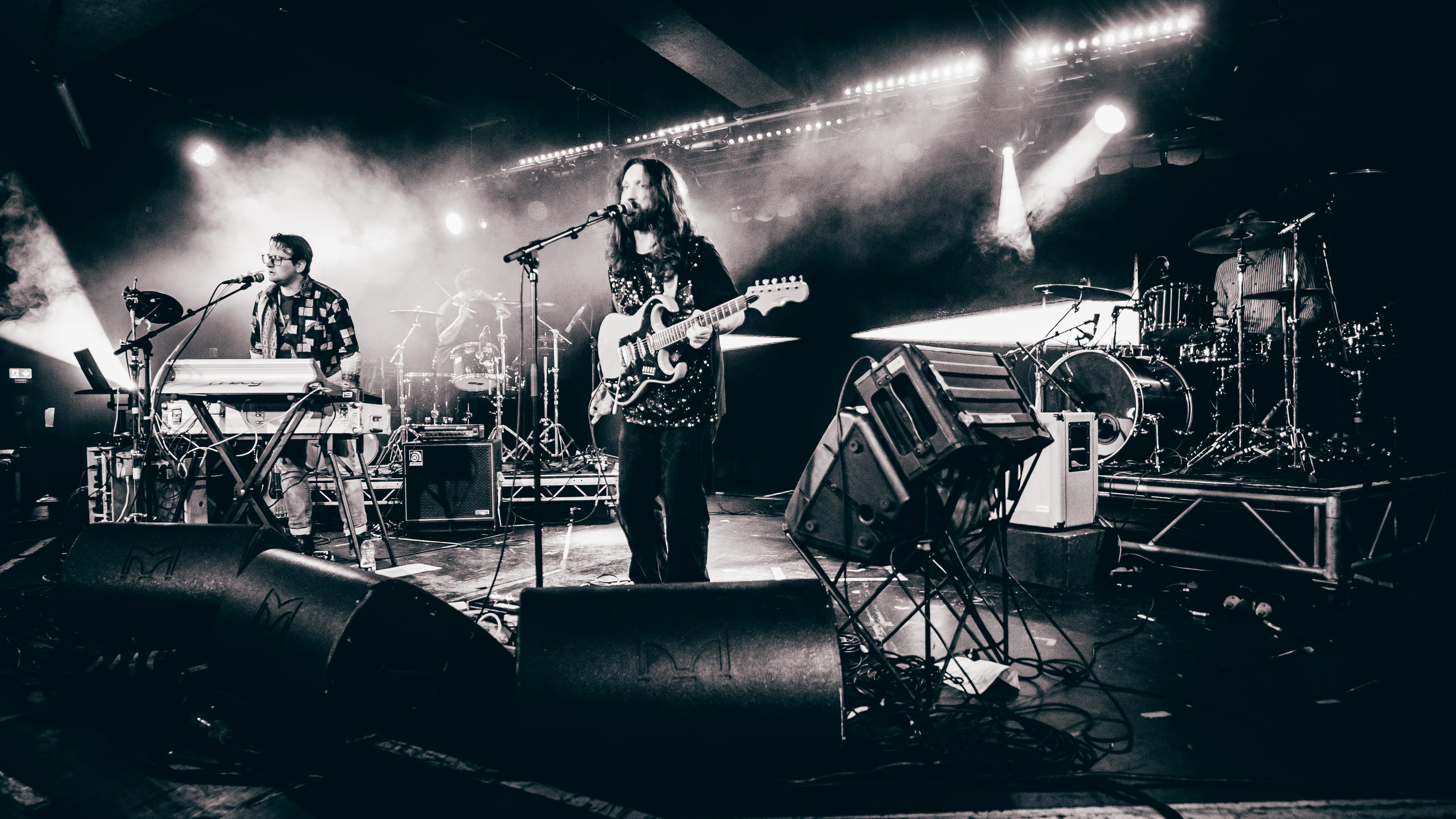
- Young Knives live in 2020.

Background information
- Origin: Ashby-de-la-Zouch, Leicestershire, England
- Genres: Post-punk revival, art rock, indie rock, experimental rock
- Years active: 1995–present
- Labels: Transgressive, Shifty Disco, Gadzook
- Members: Henry Dartnall; The House of Lords (Thomas Bonsu-Dartnall)
- Past members: Oliver Askew; Alex Gasson
- Website: young-knives.com

Young Knives are an English indie rock band from Ashby-de-la-Zouch, Leicestershire, currently based in Wantage, Oxfordshire. The group consists of brothers Henry Dartnall and Thomas Bonsu-Dartnall (the latter known professionally as "The House of Lords"). Oliver Askew was the band's drummer from 1998 until 2015.

The band were originally named Simple Pastoral Existence (which featured guitarist Alex Gasson), but this name only lasted until they split for a few years from 1997 to 1999, at which time they renamed themselves Ponyclub. The name "Ponyclub" was changed when they got their first record deal as there was already an artist in existence named "Pony Club". This was when the name "The Young Knives" was coined. They later dropped the definite article prefix prior to the release of their second full-length album, Superabundance.

They broke into the music industry in 2002 with the critical success of their debut mini-album The Young Knives... Are Dead, but began to garner national coverage upon the release of their single "The Decision" in late 2005. They played their biggest live gig in June 2006 and completed a UK tour in support of their first proper album Voices of Animals and Men, which reached No. 21 in the UK Album Charts. In July 2007 they were nominated for the Nationwide Mercury Prize. Their second album, Superabundance, entered the charts in March 2008 at number 28, with a third album, Ornaments From The Silver Arcade, ready for April 2011.

The band released their fourth album, the more experimental Sick Octave, via their official website on 21 April 2013. A Kickstarter campaign was also launched by the band on this date, with a £10,000 crowdsourcing target being set. The album was released on 4 November 2013. After a hiatus of around 4 years, Young Knives returned as a duo consisting of the Dartnall brothers, released a new single "Red Cherries" in 2019, and released their fifth album, Barbarians, in September 2020.

== Band members ==
- Henry Dartnall – vocals, guitar
- Thomas Bonsu-Dartnall (also known by his stage name "The House of Lords") – vocals, bass guitar, keyboards

=== Past members ===
- Alex Gasson - guitar (1995–1997)
- Oliver Askew – drums, backing vocals (1995–2015)

== Career ==
Formed in the north Leicestershire market town of Ashby-de-la-Zouch under the name 'Simple Pastoral Existence', the Young Knives began their career "playing bad funk and Ned's Atomic Dustbin covers", but it was their subsequent move to Oxford that saw their career begin to take off. After changing their name from 'Ponyclub', their big break came in 2002 with a successful set at the Truck Festival, which was followed by the release of ... Are Dead on local label Shifty Disco. The band also won "Road to V", a competition for bands to open the second stage at Virgin Music Festival, beating a large number of bands to win.

After some years playing successful support slots to bands such as The Futureheads and Hot Hot Heat in Oxford and surrounding areas, the band were signed to Transgressive Records, and an EP, Junky Music Make My Heart Beat Faster, was a sell-out success. Their debut single "The Decision", produced by Andy Gill of Gang of Four (a noted influence on the band), was released in December 2005, and was followed in February 2006 by "Here Comes The Rumour Mill". The latter was their first chart success, reaching No. 36 in the UK charts and receiving significant airplay on MTV2 and other video channels.

The band completed a lengthy UK tour in early 2006, and supported Dirty Pretty Things and The Rakes later in the same year, fitting in an appearance at SXSW in Texas and a terrestrial television debut on Later with Jools Holland in June. In July that year, the band made their second appearance at Truck, and released two more top 40 singles, "She's Attracted To" and "Weekends and Bleak Days (Hot Summer)", before the release of Voices of Animals and Men in August. A re-issue of "The Decision" was released on 30 October, the same day the band played what Henry described onstage as their "biggest gig ever", at the London Astoria.

In 2008, the band released their second album, Superabundance, recorded in Scotland. This spawned the single "Terra Firma" released on Transgressive Records at the end of 2007, and "Up All Night", despite Razorlight having an album and song of the same title. In July 2007, the band's former label Shifty Disco released The Young Knives ...Are Dead ...And Some, a compilation of the tracks from ...Are Dead and its follow-up EP Rollerskater. The album is an enhanced CD, which enables owners to access the rare music video for "Walking on the Autobahn".

In 2008, the Young Knives went to Asia for the first time, headlining the inaugural edition of the multimedia arts and music festival Clockenflap in Hong Kong. In March 2009, they played a 2-date China tour courtesy of Split Works. The Young Knives toured the UK extensively 'off the beaten tracks' throughout March 2008, as well as playing three dates as part of the NME Brats gigs. They also returned to their home town of Ashby-de-la-Zouch to play a one-off concert at the Ashby Venture Theatre on 6 May 2008. Also, notably the band supported Kaiser Chiefs at their homecoming gig at the Elland Road stadium, alongside Kate Nash, Friendly Fires and The Enemy, as well as playing at the Mercury Lounge on the Lower East Side in New York City.

Young Knives released "Turn Tail" and new B-sides on 19 May 2008. They were the first band since the 1970s to record from their first take straight to vinyl, and on that vinyl, there was a 'special' acoustic version of "Turn Tail", recorded at Westbourne Studios, Westbourne Park London.

Young Knives' third album, Ornaments from the Silver Arcade, was released on 4 April 2011 on Gadzook, Young Knives' own label. They released three singles from the album: "Love My Name", "Human Again" and "Vision in Rags", and toured the album extensively in 2011.

For Young Knives' fourth album, Sick Octave, the band chose to work independent of a label, crowd-funding the recording through Kickstarter. On their Kickstarter page, they wrote that they were pleased with "being able to make whatever record we want"; they also wrote that "doing our record through Kickstarter means that we can afford to hire in a wicked mixer (David Wrench, who did that Caribou record and Is Tropical and a whole host of cool records) but also get as crazy as we want on the record". The album was released on 4 November 2013, followed by a UK tour.

After a hiatus of around 4 years, Young Knives returned as a duo consisting of the Dartnall brothers, released a new single "Red Cherries" in 2019, and released their fifth album, Barbarians, in September 2020.

On 7 October 2024, the band released the single "Dissolution", and announced the album Landfill to be released on 24 January 2025 with an accompanying UK tour.

== Discography ==
=== Studio albums ===
List of albums, with selected chart positions
Title	Album details	Peak chart positions		
Title	Album details	UK	UK Indie	SCO
Voices of Animals and Men	Released: 21 August 2006; Label: Transgressive Records; Formats: CD, vinyl, digital download	21	—	26
Superabundance	Released: 10 March 2008; Label: Transgressive Records; Formats: CD, digital download	28	—	34
Ornaments from the Silver Arcade	Released: 4 April 2011; Label: Gadzook; Formats: CD, vinyl, digital download	80	12	—
Sick Octave	Released: 21 April 2013; Label: Gadzook; Formats: CD, vinyl, digital download	113	—	—
Barbarians	Released: 18 September 2020; Label: Gadzook; Formats: CD, vinyl, cassette, digital download	—	—	—
Landfill	Released: 24 January 2025; Label: Gadzook; Formats: CD, vinyl, cassette, digital download	—	—	—
"—" denotes a recording that did not chart or was not released in that territory.

=== Mini album ===
The Young Knives ...Are Dead (2002)

=== Compilations ===
The Young Knives ...Are Dead ...And Some (2007)

=== EPs ===
- 2003 Rollerskater EP
- 2004 Split EP (a collaboration with Smilex)
- 2005 Junky Music Make My Heart Beat Faster
- 2013 Oh Happiness
- 2015 Something Awful (Record Store Day exclusive)

=== Singles ===
Title	Year	Peak chart positions	Album
Title	Year	UK	Album
"The Decision"	2005	60	Voices of Animals and Men
"Here Comes the Rumour Mill"	2006	36	Voices of Animals and Men
"She's Attracted To"	2006	38	Voices of Animals and Men
"Weekends and Bleak Days (Hot Summer)"	2006	35	Voices of Animals and Men
"Terra Firma"	2007	43	Superabundance
"Up All Night"	2008	45	Superabundance
"Turn Tail"	2008	148	Superabundance
"Dyed in the Wool"	2008	—	Superabundance
"Love My Name"	2011	—	Ornaments from the Silver Arcade
"Human Again"	2011	—	Ornaments from the Silver Arcade
"Vision in Rags"	2011	—	Ornaments from the Silver Arcade
"Maureen"	2013	—	Sick Octave
"We Could Be Blood"	2013	—	Sick Octave
"White Sands"	2014	—	Sick Octave
"Red Cherries"	2019	—	Barbarians
"Sheep Tick"	2020	—	Barbarians
"Society for Cutting Up Men"	2020	—	Barbarians
"Swarm"	2020	—	Barbarians
"Dissolution"	2024	—	Landfill
"Cause & Effect"	2025	—	Landfill
"No Sound"	2025	—	Landfill
"Your Car has Arrived"	2025	—	Landfill
"Everything's a PsyOp."	2026	—	
"—" denotes a recording that did not chart or was not released in that territory.
