= The Most Gigantic Lying Mouth of All Time =

Video by Radiohead
- Released: 1 December 2004
- Recorded: 2004
- Length: 110 minutes
- Director: Chris Bran

Radiohead chronology
Meeting People Is Easy (1998)	The Most Gigantic Lying Mouth of All Time (2004)	Radiohead: The Best Of (2008)

The Most Gigantic Lying Mouth of All Time is a collection of 24 short films by the English rock band Radiohead. It accompanies their 2003 album Hail to the Thief, and comprises music videos, live performances, webcast footage and videos submitted by fans. The material was first broadcast on Radiohead's website in 2003 and released on DVD on 1 December 2004.

== Content ==
The Most Gigantic Lying Mouth of All Time comprises 24 short films that accompany Radiohead's 2003 album Hail to the Thief. It was created with the filmmaker Chris Bran and Radiohead's longtime collaborator Stanley Donwood. The title comes from a collage by the German artist John Heartfield.

The films comprise music videos, live performances, webcast footage from Radiohead's studio and videos submitted by fans. It includes a performance of "Morning Mr Magpie" by Thom Yorke on acoustic guitar, a song later released on Radiohead's 2011 album The King of Limbs. In the "My Showbiz Life" segments, Yorke and the guitarist Ed O'Brien answer "inane" questions about their celebrity lives; Yorke's voice is lowered with a pitch shifter, and O'Brien gives answers by "braying like a donkey".

The episodes are hosted by the character Chieftain Mews, who has since appeared in Radiohead's promotional material. The journalist Mac Randall described Mews as "a 21st-century Max Headroom" who "intones non-sequiturs". Yorke credited his creation to Bran.

The New York Times described The Most Gigantic Lying Mouth of All Time as "part scrapbook, part video demo reel ... an analogue lovefest of grainy images, strobing and hand-drawn animation, as the fans reflect the vertigo and anomie of the songs". The Guardian described the films as "impressionistic, surreal, and frequently inspired".

== Release ==
Radiohead planned to broadcast the material on their own television channel. The plans were cancelled, according to Yorke, due to "money, cutbacks, too weird, might scare the children, staff layoffs, shareholders". They initially streamed the material on loop on a website, Radiohead Television, that debuted in May 2003 and ran until 2004.

From December 2004, Radiohead sold copies of the DVD through their website. Reviewing the DVD, The A.V. Club said few of the videos had "multi-viewing appeal", but praised "The Slave", "The Homeland Hodown" and the performance of "Morning Mr Magpie" as standouts. In January 2020, Radiohead made The Most Gigantic Lying Mouth of All Time available to stream free on their website.
