= List of awards and nominations received by Radiohead =

Radiohead awards and nominations
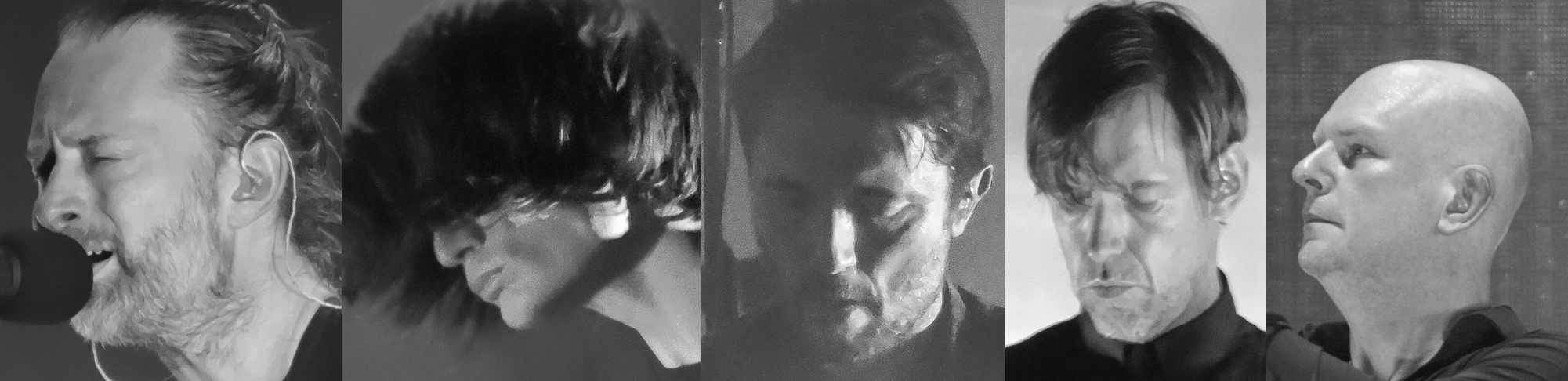
- Radiohead (left to right): Thom Yorke, Jonny Greenwood, Colin Greenwood, Ed O'Brien and Philip Selway
Awards and nominations
Award	Wins	Nominations
Brit	0	16
Grammy	3	18
Ivor Novello	4	4
Mercury Prize	0	5
MTV VMA	1	12
NME	9	9
PLUG	1	2
Q	4	11

Totals (Note: Certain award groups do not simply award one winner. They acknowledge several different recipients, have runners-up, and have third place. Since this is a specific recognition and is different from losing an award, runner-up mentions are considered wins in this award tally. For simplification and to avoid errors, each award in this list has been presumed to have had a prior nomination.)
- Wins: 42
- Nominations: 93

The English rock band Radiohead have received 22 awards from 79 nominations. They have received 16 Brit Awards nominations, and are the most nominated act in Mercury Prize history, with five nominations. They have received six Grammy Awards for Best Alternative Music Album, for OK Computer in 1998, Kid A in 2001 and In Rainbows in 2009. At the MTV Video Music Awards, Radiohead received the award for Best Art Direction for "There There" in 2003. They received the Q Award for Best Act in the World Today in 2001, 2002 and 2003. In 2019 they were inducted into the Rock and Roll Hall of Fame.

== AMFT Awards ==
Year	Category	Nominated work	Result	Ref.
2016	Best Rock Album	A Moon Shaped Pool	Won	
2016	Best Rock Duo/Group Performance	"Daydreaming"	Won	

== AIM Independent Music Awards ==
The AIM Independent Music Awards, hosted by the Association of Independent Music (AIM), were established in 2011 to recognise artists signed to independent record labels in the United Kingdom. Most of the categories and nominations are selected by an independent judging panel, though some are decided by the public.

Year	Category	Nominated work	Result	Ref.
2016	Independent Track of the Year	"Burn the Witch"	Nominated	
2016	Independent Album of the Year	A Moon Shaped Pool	Nominated	
2022	Best Creative Campaign	Kid A Mnesia	Nominated	

== Antville Music Video Awards ==
The Antville Music Video Awards are online awards for the best music video and music video directors of the year. They were first awarded in 2005. Radiohead have received one award from two nominations.

Year	Category	Nominated work	Result	Ref.
2007	Best Performance	"Jigsaw Falling Into Place"	Nominated	
2011	Best Choreography	"Lotus Flower"	Won	

== Berlin Music Video Awards ==
Year	Category	Nominated work	Result	Ref.
2016	Best Concept	Follow Me Around	Nominated	

== Brit Awards ==
The Brit Awards are the British Phonographic Industry's annual pop music awards. Radiohead failed to win all seventeen times they were nominated.

Year	Category	Nominated work	Result	Ref.
1994	British Single of the Year	"Creep"	Nominated	
1996	British Video of the Year	"Just"	Nominated	
1996	British Album of the Year	The Bends	Nominated	
1996	British Group	Radiohead	Nominated	
1998	British Group	Radiohead	Nominated	
1998	British Producer of the Year	Radiohead	Nominated	
1998	British Album of the Year	OK Computer	Nominated	
1998	British Single of the Year	"Paranoid Android"	Nominated	
1999	British Video of the Year	"No Surprises"	Nominated	
2001	British Group	Radiohead	Nominated	
2001	British Album of the Year	Kid A	Nominated	
2002	British Album of the Year	Kid A	Nominated	
2002	British Group	Radiohead	Nominated	
2004	British Group	Radiohead	Nominated	
2009	British Group	Radiohead	Nominated	
2009	British Album of the Year	In Rainbows	Nominated	
2017	British Group	Radiohead	Nominated	

== GAFFA Awards ==
=== Denmark GAFFA Awards ===
Delivered since 1991, the GAFFA Awards are a Danish award that rewards popular music by the magazine of the same name.

Year	Category	Nominated work	Result	Ref.
1997	Best Foreign Male Act	Thom Yorke (Radiohead)	Won	
1997	Best Foreign Band	Radiohead	Won	
1997	Best Foreign Album	OK Computer	Won	
1997	Best Foreign Song	"Paranoid Android"	Won	
1997	Best Foreign Live Act	Radiohead	Won	
2000	Best Foreign Band	Radiohead	Won	
2000	Best Foreign Album	Kid A	Won	
2000	Best Foreign Live Act	Radiohead	Won	
2007	Best Foreign Male Act	Thom Yorke (Radiohead)	Won	
2007	Best Foreign Band	Radiohead	Nominated	
2007	Best Foreign Album	In Rainbows	Nominated	

== Grammy Awards ==
The Grammy Award is awarded by the Recording Academy for outstanding achievement in the mainly English-language music industry. Radiohead have received three awards from 18 nominations.

Year	Category	Nominated work	Result	Ref.
1998	Album of the Year	OK Computer	Nominated	
1998	Best Alternative Music Album	OK Computer	Won	
1999	Best Alternative Music Album	Airbag / How Am I Driving?	Nominated	
2000	Best Music Film	Meeting People Is Easy	Nominated	
2001	Album of the Year	Kid A	Nominated	
2001	Best Alternative Music Album	Kid A	Won	
2002	Best Alternative Music Album	Amnesiac	Nominated	
2004	Best Alternative Music Album	Hail to the Thief	Nominated	
2004	Best Rock Performance by a Duo or Group with Vocal	"There There"	Nominated	
2009	Best Rock Performance by a Duo or Group with Vocal	"House of Cards"	Nominated	
2009	Best Rock Song	"House of Cards"	Nominated	
2009	Best Music Video	"House of Cards"	Nominated	
2009	Album of the Year	In Rainbows	Nominated	
2009	Best Alternative Music Album	In Rainbows	Won	
2012	Best Alternative Music Album	The King of Limbs	Nominated	
2012	Best Rock Performance	"Lotus Flower"	Nominated	
2012	Best Music Video	"Lotus Flower"	Nominated	
2012	Best Rock Song	"Lotus Flower"	Nominated	
2017	Best Rock Song	"Burn the Witch"	Nominated	
2017	Best Alternative Music Album	A Moon Shaped Pool	Nominated	

- Aside from their work with Radiohead, members from the band have also received nominations at the Grammy Awards for their solo works, Thom Yorke has been nominated twice for Best Alternative Music Album, for The Eraser in 2007 and Anima in 2020, for the latter, he also received nominations for Best Boxed or Special Limited Edition Package and Best Music Film. Jonny Greenwood was nominated for Best Score Soundtrack for Visual Media 2009 for the score of Paul Thomas Anderson's There Will Be Blood.
- Note: The table does not include nominations for others' work associated with Radiohead.
  - Nigel Godrich received five nominations for Producer of the Year, Non-Classical for his work with Radiohead (2001, 2002, 2004. 2006 and 2009).
  - Two albums have been nominated for Best Engineered Album, Non-Classical, Kid A in 2001 and Hail to the Thief in 2004, winning for Hail to the Thief. For Kid A, Nigel Godrich received the nomination as engineer; for Hail to the Thief, Godrich shared the award with Darrell Thorp.
  - In 2002, the special limited edition of Amnesiac for Best Recording Package, the award received by the art directors of the album, Stanley Donwood and Yorke.
  - Two albums have been nominated for Best Boxed or Special Limited Edition Package, In Rainbows in 2009, which won, and The King of Limbs in 2012. For In Rainbows, art directors Stanley Donwood, Mel Maxwell and Xiaan Munro received the award, while for The King of Limbs, Donwood and Yorke received the nomination.

== Ibiza Music Video Festival ==
Ibiza Music Video Festival is the online music video competition. Rupert Bryan and Elizabeth Fear founded the event in 2013.

Year	Category	Nominated work	Result	Ref.
2016	Best Animation	"Burn the Witch"	Won	

== Ivor Novello Awards ==
The Ivor Novello Awards are presented annually in London by the British Academy of Composers and Songwriters. Radiohead have received four awards.

Year	Category	Nominated work	Result	Ref.
1998	Best Contemporary Song	"Karma Police"	Won	
1998	Best Song Musically and Lyrically	"Paranoid Android"	Won	
2004	International Achievement in Musical Theater	Radiohead	Won	
2008	Album Award	In Rainbows	Won	

== Libera Awards ==
The Libera Awards, hosted by the American Association of Independent Music (A2IM) were established in 2012 to celebrate the achievements of artists signed to independent record labels

Year	Category	Nominated work	Result	Ref.
2017	Album of the Year	A Moon Shaped Pool	Nominated	
2017	Best Live Act	Radiohead	Won	
2017	Best Sync Usage	The Accountant Official Trailer	Nominated	
2017	Marketing Genius	Radiohead Disappears From the Internet	Nominated	
2017	Video of the Year	"Daydreaming"	Nominated	
2018	Best Re-issue	OK Computer OKNOTOK 1997 2017	Nominated	
2018	Marketing Genius	OK Computer OKNOTOK 1997 2017	Nominated	
2022	Best Re-Issue	Kid A Mnesia	Won	

== Mercury Prize ==
The Mercury Prize is an annual music prize awarded for the best album from the United Kingdom and Ireland. Radiohead have received five nominations, making them the most nominated act in Mercury Prize history.

Year	Category	Nominated work	Result	Ref.
1997	Mercury Music Prize	OK Computer	Shortlisted	
2001	Mercury Music Prize	Amnesiac	Shortlisted	
2003	Mercury Music Prize	Hail to the Thief	Shortlisted	
2008	Mercury Music Prize	In Rainbows	Shortlisted	
2016	Mercury Music Prize	A Moon Shaped Pool	Shortlisted	

== Meteor Music Awards ==
The Meteor Music Awards was an accolade bestowed upon professionals in the music industry in Ireland and further afield.

Year	Category	Nominated work	Result	Ref.
2004	Best International Album	Hail to the Thief	Nominated	
2008	Best International Album	In Rainbows	Nominated	
2008	Best International Band	Radiohead	Won	

== MTV ==
=== MTV Video Music Awards ===
The MTV Video Music Award is an award presented by the cable channel MTV to honour the best in the music video medium. Radiohead have received one award from 12 nominations.

Year	Category	Nominated work	Result	Ref.
1996	Breakthrough Video	"Just"	Nominated	
1997	Breakthrough Video	"Paranoid Android"	Nominated	
1997	International Viewer's Choice Award for MTV Europe	"Paranoid Android"	Nominated	
1998	Best Group Video	"Karma Police"	Nominated	
1998	Best Alternative Video	"Karma Police"	Nominated	
1998	Best Direction	"Karma Police"	Nominated	
1998	Best Cinematography	"Karma Police"	Nominated	
2003	Best Visual Effects	"There There"	Nominated	
2003	Best Art Direction	"There There"	Won	
2003	Best Editing	"There There"	Nominated	
2003	Best Cinematography	"There There"	Nominated	
2009	Best Video (That Should Have Won a Moonman)	"Karma Police"	Nominated	

=== MTV Europe Music Awards ===
The MTV Europe Music Award are an event presented by Viacom International Media Networks Europe which awards prizes to musicians and performers.

Year	Category	Nominated work	Result	Ref.
1997	Best Video	"Paranoid Android"	Nominated	
1997	Best Group	Radiohead	Nominated	
1997	Best Alternative	Radiohead	Nominated	
1997	Best Live Act	Radiohead	Nominated	
2003	Best Group	Radiohead	Nominated	
2016	Best Alternative	Radiohead	Nominated	

=== MTV Asia Awards ===
The MTV Asia Awards are the Asian version of the MTV Video Music Awards. Radiohead have received one award from three nominations.

Year	Category	Nominated work	Result	Ref.
2004	Favorite Video	"There There"	Nominated	
2004	Favorite Rock Act	Radiohead	Nominated	
2008	Innovation Award	Radiohead	Won	

== MVPA Awards ==
The Music Video Production Association (MVPA) is a non-profit trade organization created to address the mutual concerns of its members in today's highly competitive, ever-changing music video industry.

Year	Category	Nominated work	Result	Ref.
2002	Best Alternative Video	"Knives Out"	Won	

== NME Awards ==
The NME Awards is an annual popular music awards show in the United Kingdom. Radiohead have won nine awards.

Year	Category	Nominated work	Result	Ref.
1994	Best Single	"Creep"	Won	
1998	Best Album	OK Computer	Won	
2001	Best Band	Radiohead	Won	
2002	Best Video	"Pyramid Song"	Won	
2004	Best Album	Hail to the Thief	Won	
2004	Best Album Artwork	Hail to the Thief	Won	
2004	Best Video	"There There"	Won	
2008	John Peel Award For Musical Innovation	Radiohead	Won	
2010	Best Band Blog	www.radiohead.com	Won	
2017	Best Reissue	OK Computer OKNOTOK 1997 2017	Won	
2022	Best Reissue	Kid A Mnesia	Nominated	

== PLUG Independent Music Awards ==
The PLUG Independent Music Awards are given in support of indie music. Radiohead have received one award from two nominations

Year	Category	Nominated work	Result	Ref.
2008	Album of the Year	In Rainbows	Nominated	
2008	Artist of the Year	Radiohead	Won	

== Q Awards ==
The Q Awards are the UK's annual music awards run by the music magazine Q. Radiohead have received four awards from eleven nominations.

Year	Category	Nominated work	Result	Ref.
1997	Best Album	OK Computer	Won	
1997	Best Live Act	Radiohead	Nominated	
1998	Best Act in the World Today	Radiohead	Nominated	
1999	Best Act in the World Today	Radiohead	Nominated	
2000	Best Act in the World Today	Radiohead	Nominated	
2001	Best Act in the World Today	Radiohead	Won	
2001	Best Album	Amnesiac	Nominated	
2002	Best Act in the World Today	Radiohead	Won	
2003	Best Act in the World Today	Radiohead	Won	
2003	Best Album	Hail to the Thief	Nominated	
2004	Best Act in the World Today	Radiohead	Nominated	
2011	Greatest Act of the Last 25 Years	Radiohead	Nominated	
2012	Best Live Act	Radiohead	Nominated	
2017	Best Live Act	Radiohead	Nominated	

== Rock and Roll Hall of Fame ==
The Rock and Roll Hall of Fame, is a museum and hall of fame located in Cleveland, Ohio, United States, dedicated to document the history of rock. Radiohead were inducted in 2019.

Year	Category	Nominated work	Result	Ref.
2019	Radiohead	Inductee	Honoured	

== UK Music Video Awards ==
The UK Music Video Awards is an annual award ceremony founded in 2008 to recognise creativity, technical excellence and innovation in music videos and moving images for music. Radiohead have received six nominations.

Year	Category	Nominated work	Result	Ref.
2008	Best Rock Video	"House of Cards"	Nominated	
2011	Best Choreography	"Lotus Flower"	Nominated	
2016	Best Video Artist	Radiohead	Nominated	
2016	Best Alternative Video – UK	"Daydreaming"	Nominated	
2016	Best Alternative Video – UK	"Burn the Witch"	Nominated	
2016	Best Production Design	"Burn the Witch"	Nominated	
2016	Best Animation	"Burn the Witch"	Nominated	
2022	Best Rock Video - UK	"If You Say the Word"	Won	
