= The Music and Art of Radiohead =

The Music and Art of Radiohead is a collection of academic essays on the band Radiohead edited by Joseph Tate. It was published in May 2005 by Ashgate Publishing in their Popular and Folk Music Series (ISBN 0-7546-3979-7). It's one of "only a handful of academic studies" devoted to the band's work.

== Content ==
The book contains discussion of Radiohead's music by both established and emerging academics in the context of contemporary cultural studies. It explores topics such as their position within a global market economy and their musical influences and "radical sonic explorations".

== Table of contents ==
- Preface by Kevin J. H. Dettmar, Pomona College
- Introduction: The Music and Art of Radiohead by Joseph Tate, University of Washington
- "Kid Adorno" by Curtis White, Illinois State University
- "'We got Heads on Sticks/You got Ventriloquists': Radiohead and the Improbability of Resistance" by Davis Schneiderman, Lake Forest College
- "The Aura of Authenticity: Perceptions of Honesty, Sincerity and Truth in ‘Creep’ and ‘Kid A'" by Carys Wyn Jones, Cardiff University
- "Radiohead and the Negation of Gender" by Erin Harde, University of Western Ontario
- "To(rt)uring the Minotaur: Radiohead, Pop, Unnatural Couplings and Mainstream Subversion" by Greg Hainge, University of Adelaide
- "Ice Age Coming: The Apocalyptic Sublime in the Paintings of Stanley Donwood" by Lisa Leblanc, Canadian Museum of Civilization
- "Radiohead's Antivideos: Works of Art in the Age of Electronic Reproduction" by Joseph Tate, University of Washington
- "Deforming Rock: Radiohead’s Plunge into the Sonic Continuum" by Mark Hansen, Princeton University
- "Public School Boy Music: Debating Radiohead" by Dai Griffiths, Oxford Brookes University
- "'Sounds Like Teen Spirit': Identifying Radiohead's Idiolect" by Allan Moore and Anwar Ibrahim, University of Surrey
- "My Radiohead Adventure" by Paul Lansky, Princeton University
- "Hail to the Thief: A Rhizomatic Map in Fragments" by Joseph Tate, University of Washington

== Reception ==
Popular Music reviewed the work, commenting that although the book had weak notes it was still a "worthwhile venture". The ARSC Journal also wrote a review, noting that Radiohead's members "are averse to any sort of intellectualizing of their music" and that "If, in the end, what Radiohead does is "pure escapism," as drummer Phil Selway deems, then this book deconstructs not only that aesthetic space he claims they create, but also the very means by which the fans who wish to escape are drawn in."
