= List of the KLF's creative associates =

The original music released by The KLF, The Justified Ancients of Mu Mu, The Timelords and 2K was written, produced and performed by Jimmy Cauty and Bill Drummond. However, the duo called upon the services of recurring contributors to provide vocals, instrumentation and production support. This was particularly the case for the output of The KLF, who often referred to such contributors as "additional communicators" and, on some "Stadium House" singles, as "The Children of the Revolution".

== Additional communicators ==
The sleevenotes and labels of KLF Communications releases reveal the following significant contributors:

- Isaac Bello - Also known as Bello B, the member of Outlaw Posse rapped on "What Time Is Love? (Live at Trancentral)" and "America: What Time Is Love?", and is credited with co-authorship of these tracks.
- Black Steel - A prominent lead vocal contributor to The White Room (including scat singing), where he also played bass guitar and piano. Before and since his work with The KLF, Black Steel has worked with Mad Professor.
- Cressida Cauty - Vocalist with The KLF's spin-off project Disco 2000, Jimmy Cauty's then-wife also contributed backing vocals to several of The KLF's singles and appeared in several of their videos.
- Nick Coler - Credited for programming and keyboard contributions across The KLF's output, including the orchestral arrangement of Jerusalem in "It's Grim Up North". Since The KLF's retirement, Coler has worked with Saint Etienne and Girls Aloud as a member of Xenomania.
- Ricardo da Force - Also known as Ricardo Lyte and MC Lyte, Da Force provided raps during The KLF's "Stadium House" phase. He is credited with co-authorship of tracks on which he rapped: "3 a.m. Eternal", "Last Train to Trancentral" and "Justified and Ancient (Stand by The JAMs)". Da Force later appeared on N-Trance's cover of "Stayin' Alive".
- Wanda Dee - Vocals - taken from her track "To the Bone" - on The KLF singles "What Time Is Love? (Live at Trancentral)" and "Last Train to Trancentral (Live from the Lost Continent)" and the White Room album versions. To avoid a lawsuit from Dee's manager and husband Eric Floyd, she was given co-writing credits under her real name L'wanda McFarland for these tracks and featured in The KLF video The Stadium House Trilogy.
- Maxine Harvey - British born vocalist on The White Room projects and "Justified and Ancient (All Bound for Mu Mu Land)".
- Duy Khiem - Played tenor saxophone and clarinet, most prominently on "3 a.m. Eternal". Khiem was also responsible for the a cappella traditional Vietnamese song "Me Ru Con" on 1987 (What the Fuck Is Going On?) (for which he was credited as "Zuy Khiem" on "1987: The JAMs 45 Edits") and "Z Khiem" on the single "All You Need Is Love (Mẹ Ru Con Remix)".
- Graham Lee - Contributed pedal steel to Drummond's solo album The Man, and The KLF's Chill Out and The White Room.
- June Montana aka Mo - Vocalist with Disco 2000. Formerly sang with Brilliant, an earlier band of Cauty's.
- Scott Piering - A well-respected record promoter by trade, Drummond and Cauty claim in The Manual that Piering's involvement in the promotion of "Doctorin' the Tardis" was crucial to its UK Singles Chart success. Piering also lent his voice to several narrations in The KLF's recordings, including many of the profitable singles and the video The Rites of Mu.
- Mark "Spike" Stent - The music producer cites his work with The KLF on their most commercially successful recordings as the key to his subsequent rise to prominence.
- Tony Thorpe - The Moody Boys' Thorpe was credited for rhythms, samples and breaks during The White Room project. The Moody Boys were also responsible for remix 12"s of the "Stadium House Trilogy" singles.

== Guest contributors ==
Whereas The JAMs' earlier work sampled prominently and illegally from the popular works of established artists, The KLF's international reputation allowed their later releases to feature guest vocals from such established performers as Tammy Wynette (for "Justified and Ancient (Stand by The JAMs)", Gary Glitter (for "Doctorin' the Tardis") and Glenn Hughes (for "America: What Time Is Love?"). Drummond has expressed disgust at this notion in his book 45. In a chapter written in 1998, Drummond professes to have "worshipped" Wynette's voice, yet he nevertheless says, "The whole British tradition of 'young' white artists dragging up some has-been legend to perform with is an evil and corrupt exchange; the young artist wanting to tap into the mythical status and credibility of the has-been, the has-been wanting some of that 'I'm still contemporary, relevant (and will do anything to get back into the charts)' stuff."

== Other creative associates ==
- Bill Butt - Director of The KLF's unreleased road movie The White Room.
- Simon Cauty - Jimmy's brother; made many of the KLF's props and the set for the Stadium House Trilogy video
- Jeremy Deller - Deller's Acid Brass project, featuring the Williams Fairey Band, provided inspiration for Drummond and Cauty's 1997 "Fuck the Millennium" project, under the pseudonym 2K; a performance by 2K was billed as "Jeremy Deller presents 2K", as was the subsequent single release.
- Echo & the Bunnymen - The band (for whom Drummond had once been manager) are credited with a remix of "What Time Is Love?" on the single "What Time Is Love? (Remodelled & Remixed)".
- Extreme Noise Terror (ENT) - British grindcore band with whom The KLF collaborated for a version of "3 a.m. Eternal" and the unreleased album The Black Room.
- Miomir Grujic (DJ Fleka) - Radio DJ on Serbian station B92, DJ Fleka contributed a vocal sample to Drummond and Cauty's track "The Magnificent" (donated by the duo to The Help Album of 1995).
- Alan Goodrick - Also known as "Gimpo", Goodrick is a friend and associate of Drummond and Cauty. He has made several films used by the duo in their artistic and musical work. He also contributed vocals to "Fuck the Millennium" and, for Cauty's later project Blacksmoke, "Gimpo Gimpo".
- Mick Houghton - PR man that Drummond has worked with for over 40 years, including on the release of the JAMs' 2017 novel, 2023: A Trilogy. Wrote the book Fried & Justified: Hits, Myths, Break-Ups and Breakdowns in the Record Business 1978-98 in which the Houghton's work with the KLF features and for which Drummond wrote the foreword and Cauty designed the cover.
- Mark Manning - Also known as "Zodiac Mindwarp" or "Z" from The Love Reaction, Manning contributed vocals to "Fuck the Millennium" and has since accompanied Drummond on expeditions documented in their books Bad Wisdom and Wild Highway.
- Alex Paterson - Co-founder of The Orb with Jimmy Cauty. In 1989, The Orb produced an ambient remix of "3 a.m. Eternal" entitled "Blue Danube Orbital". Cauty left The Orb in April 1990 due to Paterson's concern that The Orb should not be perceived as a side-project of The KLF. Paterson retained and developed 'The Orb' name, while Cauty took recordings originally intended to be The Orb's debut album, removed Paterson's contributions, and released Space under the pseudonym 'Space'. Additionally, Simon Reynolds (1999) and Mark Prendergast (2003) claim uncredited involvement of Alex Paterson in the development of The KLF album Chill Out.
- Pete Wylie featured as lead vocalist on a limited edition white label version of the JAM's "It's Grim Up North" circulated in 1990.
