= The 17 =

Choir

Bill Drummond's (creator) description of The17 Choir

The 17 is a choir. It writes and performs improvised music scores and does not make recordings of its performances. Anyone who wants to can become a member of The 17 by joining a performance on its UK Coast-to-Coast or World City-to-City tours. The 17 was founded by Bill Drummond as a development of his interest in choral music, after hearing the music of Arvo Pärt. It also follows Drummond's belief that "all recorded music has run its course" and that music should be a performed art form, "celebrating time, place and occasion and nothing to do with something trapped in the iPod in your pocket".

The principal tenets of The 17 are stated on Penkiln Burn Notices created by Bill Drummond. These notices, along with approximately 400 composed scores for the choir, are freely available for viewing, downloading and printing on a website dedicated to The 17. The website also contains news about upcoming performances and images of Drummond's graffiti carried out in the name of the choir.:

== Name ==
Drummond states that he thought of the name immediately. It has origins in his love of Prime numbers, and his idea of the seventeenth year as a stage of life between the "sweet, coy" sixteen and the full adulthood of eighteen. It is also a play on the name of The Sixteen, a professional choir admired by him. While the first performance of The 17 was carried out by 17 men in a studio in Leicester, the name no longer dictates the number of choir members for a performance; scores may be performed by hundreds of voices or none.

== Ethos ==
The choir's ethos derives from Drummond's disillusionment with recorded music. He released a manifesto calling on people to "dispense with all previous forms of music and music-making and start again".

Each performance has no audience and is never recorded. Also, there is no sheet music; instead the choir performs according to instructions written by Drummond or other choir members. These instructions (called "scores," but bearing little relation to musical scores) are open to change over time, and exist in the public domain.

== Tours ==
The 17's Coast-to-Coast tour "encompasses 20 different scores each performed at one of 20 different locations within the shores of the British Isles. Each performance is twinned with an overseas performance of The 17". Performances have been twinned so far between, for example, Liverpool and New York, Beirut and Birmingham, and Derry and Calcutta. There is also a "City-to-City" World Tour of The 17 on which a version of SCORE 328 titled SURROUND is performed each time. SURROUND entails 100 members of The 17, standing in a circle in a city at up to 50-metre intervals between them. Choir members then call/sing to the choir member next along with some specified notes or phrases such as "way-ho!" The circle may be circumnavigated several times. So far the City-to-City World Tour has included locations such as Port-au-Prince, Beijing, Salford and Tromsø (Norway). The 17 performed in London on 18 March 2012, recreating with the Syrian community an event which was originally planned to take place in Damascus, Syria. Drummond explained: "it would best for all concerned if the Syrian leg of the tri-nation festival was postponed for a few weeks or maybe months, when things would have undoubtedly settled down."

== Members ==
The choir has a constantly shifting membership (the choir's website states that to join one need only turn up and sing. As of April 2009 there have been 1,508 performers, mostly members of the public with little or no experience in professional music.

== The 17 in schools ==
In 2006, Drummond was invited to help schoolchildren compose scores in a project sponsored by the Arts Council. Children from several primary and secondary schools in County Durham wrote scores that were eventually compiled in the book Scores 18–76. The children also performed their scores in the Hatton Gallery, Newcastle.

== Score 1. IMAGINE and graffiti ==
Of approximately 400 existing scores written by Bill Drummond and other members of The 17, Score No. 1 is titled IMAGINE. It begins with the words "Imagine waking up tomorrow and all music has disappeared." For many new locations on The 17's World Tour, a Penkiln Burn notice is created with the IMAGINE score translated into the local language. Translations in 22 different languages exist so far including various European languages, Chinese, Hebrew, Arabic, Russian and Haitian Creole. For many locations on the World Tour, Drummond finds a place to graffiti the first line of the IMAGINE score translated in the local language. Artists and members of The 17, John Hirst and Tracey Moberley, have documented much of this graffiti with their own photographs.

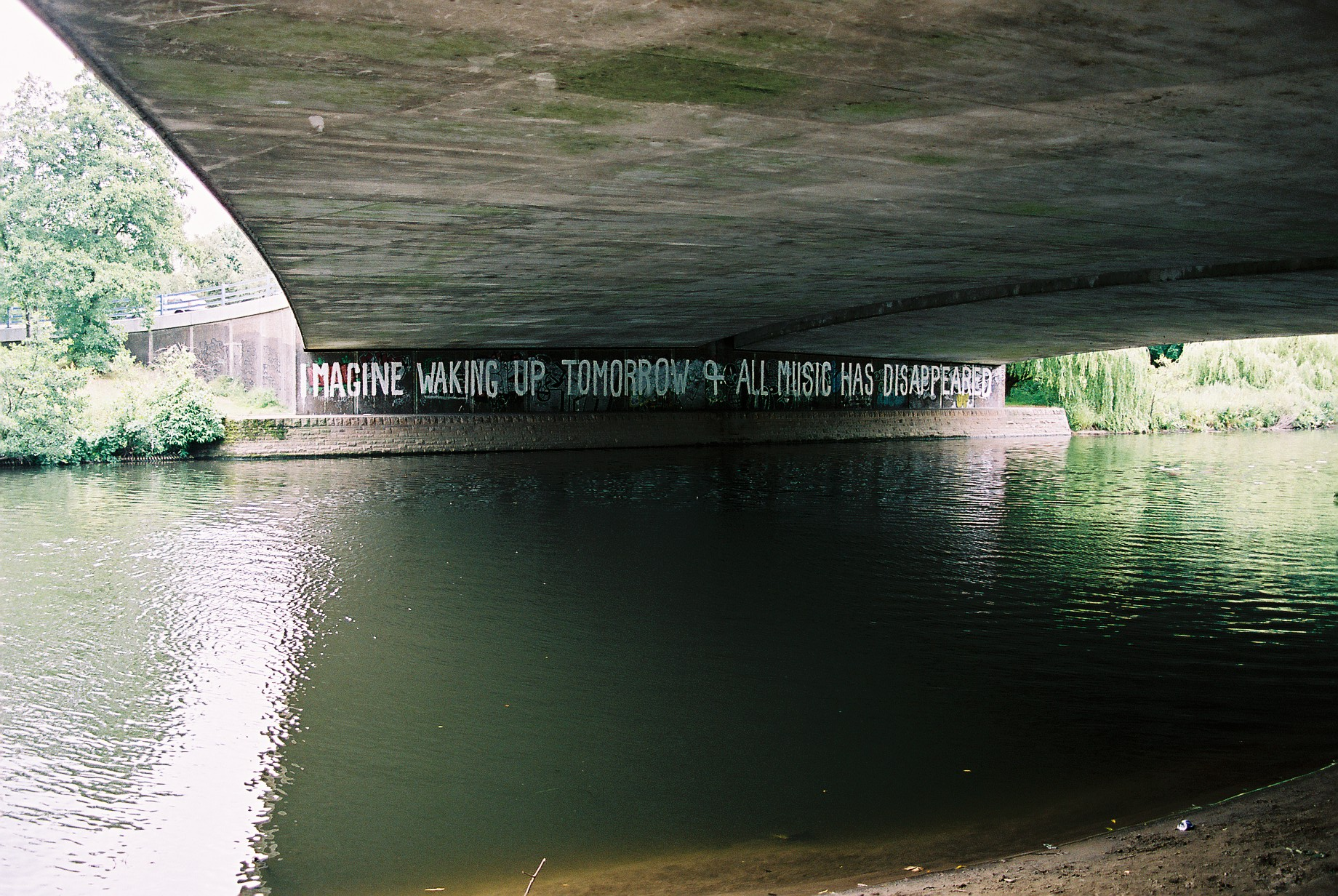
IMAGINE Graffiti in Derby made by Bill Drummond, photographed by John Hirst, 2008

== 17 ==
Bill Drummond's 2008 book, titled 17, "draws on the strands of thought that led [him] to instigate The 17", from his childhood, his art school years and his work in the music industry. The book then documents The 17's first year including the choir's first performances, its reception and development by school children and Drummond's instigation of No Music Day. The book was published by Beautiful Books.

== Imagine Waking Up Tomorrow and All Music Has Disappeared ==
Following several years of convocations of the 17, and its accompanying graffito, Drummond brought an end to the 17 in 2012 and was to mark this with the making of a documentary Coast to Coast. Directed by Stefan Schwietert the finished film Imagine Waking Up Tomorrow and All Music Has Disappeared documents a final tour across the UK The Atlantic Archipelago, a series of performances of various incarnations of the 17 along a line drawn across a map of the British Isles from Skegness to Inishmore in line with much of Drummond's artistic practice. One completed Drummond was conflicted about some of the artifices of the film document, and took the film on a tour of the same line in order to discover the meaning of the film, and also to formulate plans to remake the documentary as a Hollywood action blockbuster. Drummond and photographer Tracey Moberly premiered the film on July 3, 2016, at the junction of the tour line and the Prime Meridian the home of a singer Robert Wyatt and artist Alfie Benge in Louth, England, before a series of, frequently audienceless, screenings in the original Atlantic Archipelago locations, beginning on Skegness beach.

== Bibliography ==
- Scores 18–76 (Penkiln Burn, 2006)
- 17 (Beautiful Books, 2008)ISBN 9781905636266
- Imajine by Claudel Casseus with Introduction by Bill Drummond (Penkiln Burn, 2011)
- 100 (Penkiln Burn, 2012)
- Imagine Waking Up Tomorrow and All Music His Disappeared dir. by Stefan Schwietert (RealFiction, 2015)

== See also ==
- Street choir
- Angelis
- The Bach Choir
