= Wanda Dee =

American singer-songwriter

- Born: Lawanda McFarland; April 12, 1963 (age 62)
- Origin: The Bronx, New York, USA
- Genres: Hip hop
- Occupation: Musician
- Instruments: DJ, rapping
- Years active: 1984–present
- Labels: Tuff City; ZYX; Festival; Goddess Empire
- Spouse: Eric Floyd
- Partner: Richard Sisco

Wanda Dee (born April 12, 1963 as Lawanda McFarland) is an American hip hop artist.

== Career ==
=== Early life ===
Lawanda McFarland grew up in the Bronx, New York. While still a teenager, she became the first female hip hop DJ as the protégée of hip hop DJ Kool Herc, who gave her the stage name "Wanda Dee". She was eventually introduced to Afrika Bambaataa, who inducted her into his Universal Zulu Nation. Alongside of her boyfriend/business partner, rapper Richard Sisco ("Sisco Kid"), she appeared in Beat Street, a 1984 film about the hip hop sub-culture produced by Harry Belafonte. Dee and Sisco's relative success - she received many offers to go on tour while he did not - contributed to the pair breaking up. At the time, Dee had already met Eric Floyd, her future husband and manager.

Floyd encouraged her to switch from the turntables to the microphone and in 1986, she released her first single, "Blue Eyes", produced by British hit factory Stock Aitken Waterman. In 1989, she achieved commercial success with "The Goddess"/"To the Bone". The publication of a full album was hampered by disagreements with Tuff City Records, Dee's distributor at the time.

=== Dispute and association with the KLF ===
In 1990 and 1991, respectively, British music duo The KLF - Bill Drummond and Jimmy Cauty - used unauthorized samples from "To the Bone" in the "stadium house version" of their tracks "What Time Is Love?" and "Last Train To Trancentral". When manager Eric Floyd by chance heard the former track at a disco, he sued Drummond and Cauty for copyright infringement. A 1993 article in Beat magazine quotes Floyd:

I'd never heard of these people and they'd never asked Dee's permission to use her voice. They'd taken off her biggest selling rap single 'To The Bone' - the record opens up with Dee saying 'I wanna see you sweat' - and sampled it right off the record and put it on What Time is Love?. It wasn't until I went to sue Bill Drummond and Jimmy Cauty that I discovered they had also taken from the same record the line 'come on boy do you wanna ride?' and slapped that on Last Train to Trancentral. [...] they think it's OK to steal other people's material, by-passing other people's publishing companies and copyright, putting it into their own records, using their own studio wizardry, in releasing it to the masses. But they'd just gone too far this time."

The KLF agreed to a settlement: Dee received a payment, a share in royalties and co-writing credits on the U.S. release of the album The White Room. Under the agreement, Dee also appeared in the "Stadium House" video to "Last Train To Trancentral". Drummond and Cauty also agreed to produce a track for Dee's upcoming solo album, but this collaboration never materialised. Dee claimed, "I wasn't INVITED into The KLF, I was IGNITED!"

After The KLF retired (and deleted their back catalogue) in early 1992, Dee took off on a two-year concert tour that spanned 150 cities in 90 countries. The show, dubbed "The KLF Experience featuring Wanda Dee" or "The Voice of KLF, Wanda Dee", combined the KLF's pre-recorded music with her own live vocals and lavish costumes. Drummond and Cauty, who were displeased by Dee's use of the KLF moniker, requested that their U.S. distribution company, Arista Records, issue a cease and desist order, but the company refused, estimating that an international tour would only boost their sale of KLF material. Dee's repeated claim that she had been an integral or even the decisive part in the KLF's success raised controversy among observers.

Ben Butler, in an interview for The Big Issue Australia, asked Jimmy Cauty for his thoughts on "the act that was doing the rounds several years ago that called itself the KLF, but didn't feature either Bill Drummond or yourself [Cauty]". Cauty responded

I actually felt more sorry for the band than the audience. We did write to them to ask them to reconsider and got this amazing letter in return, they really thought they WERE the KLF, and without the Wanda Dee sample we would never have sold a single record. 9 out of 10 for total insanity.

=== Beyond the KLF ===
In the early 1990s, Dee signed a multi-album record deal with her previous producers Stock & Waterman. A debut album was produced but the release came to a halt when Stock & Waterman's partnership disbanded in 1993. In 1994, still riding on the KLF success, Dee published the single "I Wanna See You Sweat" with German record company ZYX.

In 2003, Dee formed her own record label, Goddess Empire, and finally published her debut album, The Goddess Is Here. The same year, she also participated in the Zulu Nation's 30th anniversary performance.

== Discography ==
Singles

- "Blue Eyes" (1986, Lisson Records/Critique)
- "The Goddess"/"To The Bone" (1989, Tuff City)
- "I Wanna See You Sweat" (1994, ZYX)
- "I Like It Hard" (1997, Festival Records, Pride Music)
- "Love Like Mine" (2003, Goddess Empire Record Label)

Album

- The Goddess Is Here! (2003, Goddess Empire Record Label)

== See also ==
- List of The KLF's creative associates
