= The Help Album =

Compilation album by various artists
- Released: 9 September 1995
- Recorded: 4 September 1995
- Genre: Various
- Length: 75:39
- Label: Go!
- Producer: War Child

War Child charity albums chronology
The Help Album (1995)	NME in Association with War Child Presents 1 Love (2002)

Professional ratings
Review scores
Source	Rating
AllMusic	3/5 stars
NME	(10/10)
Wall of Sound	52/100

The Help Album is a 1995 charity album to raise funds for the War Child charity, which provided aid to war-stricken areas, such as Bosnia and Herzegovina. All the songs were recorded in a single day. The album features British and Irish artists including Paul McCartney, Blur, Paul Weller, Radiohead, Oasis, The KLF and Manic Street Preachers. It was followed by 1 Love (2002), Hope (2003), Help!: A Day in the Life (2005), War Child Presents Heroes (2009), and Help(2) (2026).

== Recording ==
The album's recording was inspired by the concept behind John Lennon's "Instant Karma!" – records, like newspapers, should be released as soon as they are recorded. Help was recorded on Monday, 4 September 1995, mixed on Tuesday 5th and was in shops on Saturday 9th. The original version release did not include any tracklist attached to the sleeve notes; the tracklisting was instead printed as a full-page ad in New Musical Express. Notable tracks include:

- A version of The Beatles' song "Come Together", by new supergroup the Smokin' Mojo Filters: Paul McCartney, Paul Weller, Noel Gallagher, Steve Cradock, Steve White, and Carleen Anderson.
- A cover of "Raindrops Keep Fallin' on My Head", which marked Manic Street Preachers' return to recording after the disappearance of Richey Edwards.
- The first appearance of the Radiohead song "Lucky", later included on the 1997 album OK Computer.
- An early version of "Adnan's", a track from Orbital's fourth album In Sides.
- Suede's cover of Elvis Costello's "Shipbuilding".
- The first new recording from Bill Drummond and Jimmy Cauty (better known as The KLF, but performing here as 'One World Orchestra') in over 2 years, "The Magnificent": a drum and bass version of the theme tune from the film The Magnificent Seven, with vocal samples from DJ Fleka of Serbian radio station B92.
- A version of Bobbie Gentry's "Ode to Billie Joe" by Sinéad O'Connor. As the makers of the album were putting the final touches to the album, a courier arrived with a tape of O'Connor's contribution. In theory, the song had arrived too late for inclusion in the album, but the producers were so impressed with her haunting rendition that they felt they had to include the song.
- An early appearance by Kate Moss with her then boyfriend Johnny Depp on the Oasis contribution, "Fade Away".
- A re-recording of "Love Spreads" by The Stone Roses; this is the only studio recording by the band that features drummer Robbie Maddix and keyboard player Nigel Ippinson.

The album's sleeve notes included a contribution from former Nirvana bassist Krist Novoselic, as well as artwork by John Squire and Massive Attack's 3-D. It reached number one on the UK albums compilation charts, and would have reached number one on the UK albums chart had the UK chart compilers not refused to accept it as a single artist album (Go! Discs had attempted to get around the chart restriction on various artists albums by declaring that all contributors were members of a one-off supergroup called War Child). In his book A Year with Swollen Appendices, Brian Eno writes bitterly about this decision, claiming that it cost the charity thousands of pounds in lost sales. Nevertheless, the album raised more than £1.25 million for War Child.

== Track listing ==
The full track listing is not given in the booklet as it was not known at the time of printing.

No.	Title	Performed by	Length
1.	"Fade Away"	Oasis and Friends (Johnny Depp, Kate Moss, Lisa Moorish)	4:11
2.	"Oh Brother"	The Boo Radleys	3:42
3.	"Love Spreads"	The Stone Roses	3:46
4.	"Lucky"	Radiohead	4:20
5.	"Adnan"	Orbital	3:42
6.	"Mourning Air"	Portishead	3:46
7.	"Fake the Aroma" (alternate version of "Karmacoma")	Massive Attack	3:25
8.	"Shipbuilding"	Suede	3:13
9.	"Time For Livin'"	The Charlatans vs. The Chemical Brothers	4:12
10.	"Sweetest Truth (Show No Fear)"	Stereo MCs	5:00
11.	"Ode to Billie Joe"	Sinéad O'Connor	4:59
12.	"Searchlights"	The Levellers	3:51
13.	"Raindrops Keep Fallin' on My Head"	Manic Street Preachers	2:57
14.	"Tom Petty Loves Veruca Salt"	Terrorvision	3:01
15.	"The Magnificent"	The One World Orchestra featuring The Massed Pipes and Drums of the Children's Free Revolutionary Volunteer Guards	2:15
16.	"Message to Crommie"	Planet 4 Folk Quartet (Andrew Weatherall and David Harrow)	3:48
17.	"Dream a Little Dream of Me"	Terry Hall	3:27
18.	"1, 2, 3, 4, 5"	Neneh Cherry and Trout	4:13
19.	"Eine kleine Lift Musik"	Blur	4:17
20.	"Come Together"	The Smokin' Mojo Filters (Paul McCartney, Paul Weller, Noel Gallagher, Steve Cradock, Steve White, Carleen Anderson)	3:32

=== The Help EP ===
An abbreviated Help EP was released in conjunction with the Help album. It charted at number 51 after BBC Radio 1 chose not to play it.

No.	Title	Performed by	Length
1.	"Lucky"	Radiohead	4:20
2.	"50ft Queenie" (Live)	PJ Harvey	2:51
3.	"Momentum (Guru's Jazzmatazz)"	Guru	3:04
4.	Untitled	Portishead	2:01

=== "Come Together" single ===
The Smokin' Mojo Filters' version of "Come Together" was released as a single, reaching number 19 on the UK Singles Chart. Like the Help EP, it featured a variety of artists.

No.	Title	Performed by	Length
1.	"Come Together"	The Smokin' Mojo Filters	3:32
2.	"A Minute's Silence"	The Beautiful South	3:06
3.	"It Is Me"	Dodgy	3:29
4.	"In the Name of the Father" (Crown of Thorns Mix)	Black Grape	4:31

== Charts ==
Chart performance for The Help Album
Chart (1995)	Peak position
Scottish Albums (Official Charts)	1
UK Compilation Albums (Official Charts)	1

Chart (2026)	Peak position
Dutch Compilation Albums (Compilation Top 30)	9
