= Tracey Moberly =

Welsh artist (born 1964)

- Born: Tracey Karen Wood; 1964 (age 61–62); Tredegar, South Wales, UK
- Education: Newport School of Art (now the University of South Wales), Manchester Metropolitan University
- Known for: Activist Art
- Notable work: Text-Me-Up! Tweet-Me-Up
- Website: sanderswood.com

Tracey Moberly (born Tracey Karen Wood, Tredegar, South Wales, 1964; formerly married as Sanders-Wood) is an interdisciplinary artist, author and radio show host, and was also a co-owner of the Foundry in London. She exhibits prolifically and is best known for her work with mobile phone text messages around which her book Text Me Up! is based. Moberly's art is often described as socio-political.

== Overview ==
Tracey Moberly achieved a first-class honours degree in art and design from Newport College of Art (now the University of South Wales) (1985), and an MA in art as environment at Manchester Metropolitan University (1996), where she also lectured during the 1990s. Since 2001 she has lived and worked in the East End of London.

Moberly produces work in a broad range of media including brickwork, glass, thread and fabric. She has run workshops at the Natural History Museum on spinning and dyeing from natural dye stuffs such as vegetables. Her work with spinning and dyeing lead to a collaboration with comedian Shazia Mirza on F*** Off, I'm a Hairy Woman, an hour long television documentary presented by Mirza in which the artist spun and made over 80 lingerie garment sets out of human hair. Tracey has made poetry from bricks and has made sculpted bricks that make up the structure of buildings. She also works in steel, iron & glass. A recently favoured artistic medium is intricate embroidery which she is using in a project titled Text-Me-Up-Sex-Drugs & Rock’n’Roll.

== Activist art ==
Tracey Moberly's artwork has been selected to profile a number of topical but difficult to approach activist campaigns. Whilst in some of these her work has been used indirectly to publicise issues, in others she has used her work to fight directly on behalf of an issue, using art as activism. In the past the Club 18-30 Billboard 'Beaver Espana & Summer of 69' advertising campaign was successfully stopped as Moberly organised a graffiti campaign to add the safe sex slogans that she thought were missing from the advertisements.

With comedian Mark Thomas, Moberly has set up McDemos, a 'protest solutions company' for those whose modern lives are too busy to protest themselves. One of their first actions was to commission UHC Collective for a mass cover-up of street advertising hoardings in Manchester. McDemos has been closely involved in the campaign to abolish the British SOCPA law (Serious Organised Crime and Police Act 2005), turning protest into an art form inside the SOCPA zone around the Houses of Parliament. Moberly has organised workshops at Tate Britain on the theme of Art as Protest and she has lectured on the subject at Sheffield Hallam and Manchester Metropolitan Universities.

=== Coca-Cola's Nazi Adverts Exhibition ===
"Coca Cola GmbH (Germany) collaborated with the Nazis. The company advertised in Nazi papers financially assisting the regime. They opened up bottling plants in Sudetenland shortly after the Nazis had invaded. They exhibited at Nazi trade fairs. In 1941 when Coca Cola GmbH could no longer get the syrup to make Coke from America they created a new drink out of the ingredients they had available to them. That drink created for the Nazi soft drink market was Fanta." (Coca Cola's Nazi Adverts – Art Exhibition 2004 press release)

Tracey Moberly and Mark Thomas arranged an exhibition in which they extended an open invitation to artists to re-imagine how Coca-Cola's advertising in Nazi literature and at Nazi events would have looked (originals are hard to locate). The resulting exhibition included hundreds of artworks and was first shown in the Foundry in June 2004. It has since travelled widely, being shown in Colombia, Ecuador, Mexico and Russia. The Grocer reports that Coca-Cola disputes the facts presented in the exhibition but the company has taken no action against Moberly and Thomas.

== Text Me Up! ==
Moberly has saved every text message she has been sent since her first in 1999 . From this material she has produced a series of exhibitions and art interventions. The first, Text-Me-Up! was held in Manchester in 2000. This was followed by Text-Me-Up-Too! in The Foundry, London, December 2001, in which text messages received by her were printed out onto long scrolls, creating a temple-like installation. Text-Me-Up-3! (2001) and T4XT-M4-UP-MOR4... (2002) involved launching balloons to which were attached randomly selected text messages. Text-Me-Up-Five! included the participation of four other artists – Danny Pockets, Jaime Rory Lucy, Dunstan Bruce and Moira Minguella. In this show Tracey meshes the new technology of SMS text messaging with the traditional craft of embroidery. The show opened at the Foundry in May 2006, then moved to the Nancy Victor Gallery in London and later to the Hastings Arts Forum.

Her text message collection is the subject of a book by the artist, Text-Me-Up!, published June 2011. The work is structured around three narratives – archived text messages from the past, current text message conversations, and an autobiographical text, beginning and ending in Manchester and covering the last eleven years of Tracey's life in London's East End. The book describes her collaborative practice with notable figures from popular culture including Alabama 3, Banksy, Tony Benn, Pete Doherty, Bill Drummond, Howard Marks, John SInclair, Gavin Turk and Martyn Ware.

== Tweet Me Up! ==
On 27 August 2012, Moberly created a work at Tate Modern The Tanks based on proposal to artists that was sent out solely on social media sites such as a Facebook. One of the themes was how being different can lead to abuse and violence. The event remembered the life and violent death of Sophie Lancaster who died (24 August 2007) after she and her boyfriend were attacked in 2007.

== Publications ==
=== By the artist ===
- Text-Me-Up! (2011, Beautiful Books; ISBN 978-1-905636-82-2)

=== Containing work by the artist ===
- The 25 Paintings (Penkiln Burn, 2014) ISBN 978-0954165697
- Agit Disco, Stefan Szczelkun (ed.) Book (forthcoming from Mute magazine)
- Haiti Ghetto Biennale, Photo essay by Tracey Moberly in Dazed & Confused April 2010
- Coke repeating by Tracey Moberly in Frontline Latin America September 2006
- New Zapatistas: on the campaign trail with Subcomandante Marcos by Tracey Moberly, Dazed & Confused, July 2006
- 5 magazine, curated by Gavin Turk featuring work by Tracey Sanders-Wood and Moira Minguella (August 2004, ISSN 1477-6774)
- SIC – Adventures in Anti-Capitalism (October 2002, Book Press; ISBN 1-900672-01-4)
- Too Much Spirit, in The Idler, issue 27 – Everybody Loves a Fool (September 2000, The Idler; ISBN 0-9536720-2-6)
- Navigating the Terror by John Hyatt, with contributions by Tracey Sanders-Wood (July 2000, Ellipsis; ISBN 1-899858-66-0)
- Stalk with Sue Hubbard (September 1999, Manchester Metropolitan University; ISBN 1-900756-07-2)
- Give Battle in Vain co-written with Prof John Hyatt (April 1999, Manchester Metropolitan University; ISBN 1-900756-08-0)
- Innovation and Tradition – Fine Arts in Manchester (February 1999, Manchester Metropolitan University; ISBN 1-900756-07-2)

== See also ==
- Criticism of Coca-Cola – Nazi Germany and World War II
- SMS text messages
- Protest art
