= Foundry (bar) =

Coordinates: 51.5262°N 0.0834°W

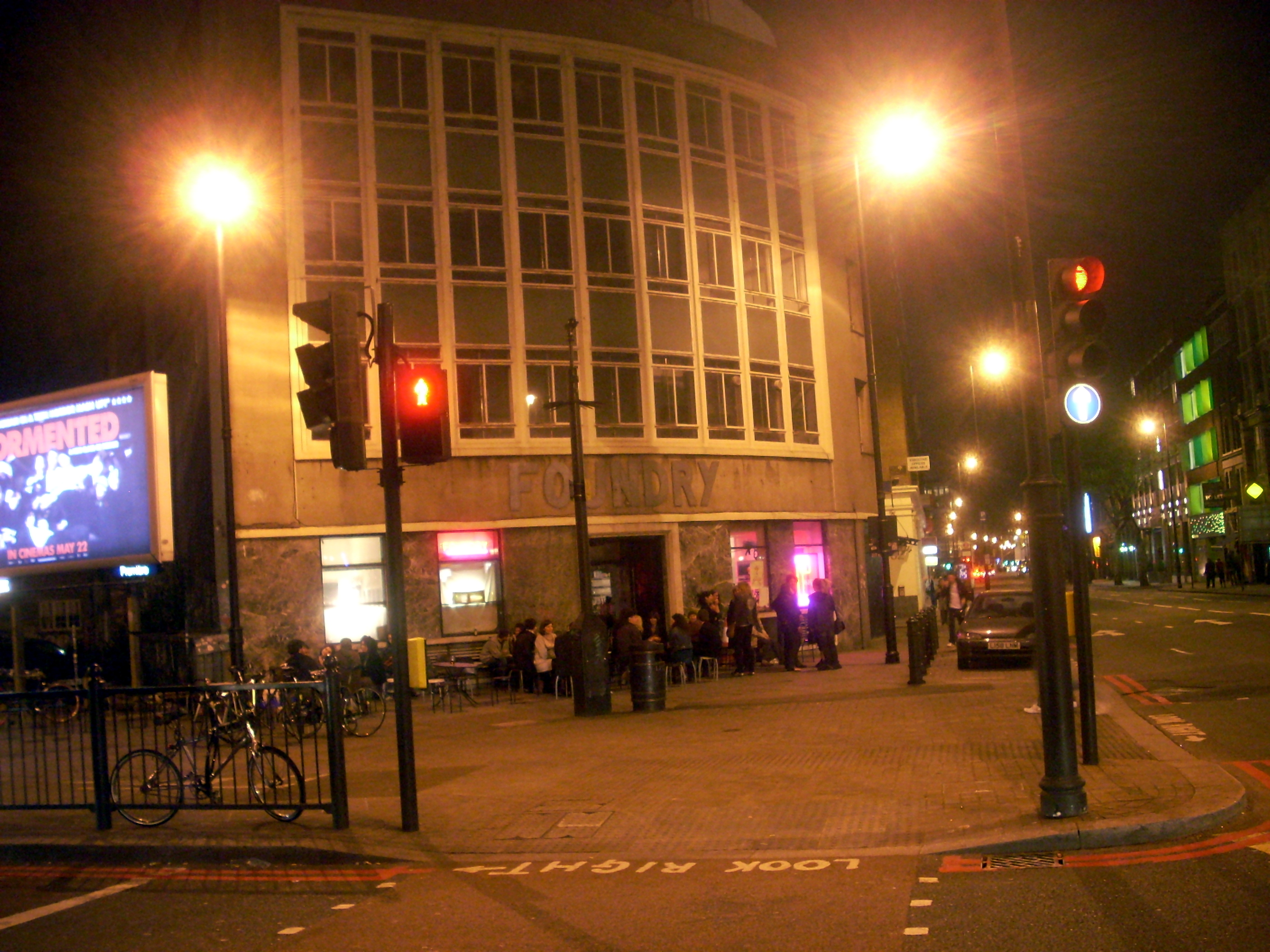
The exterior of the Foundry by night

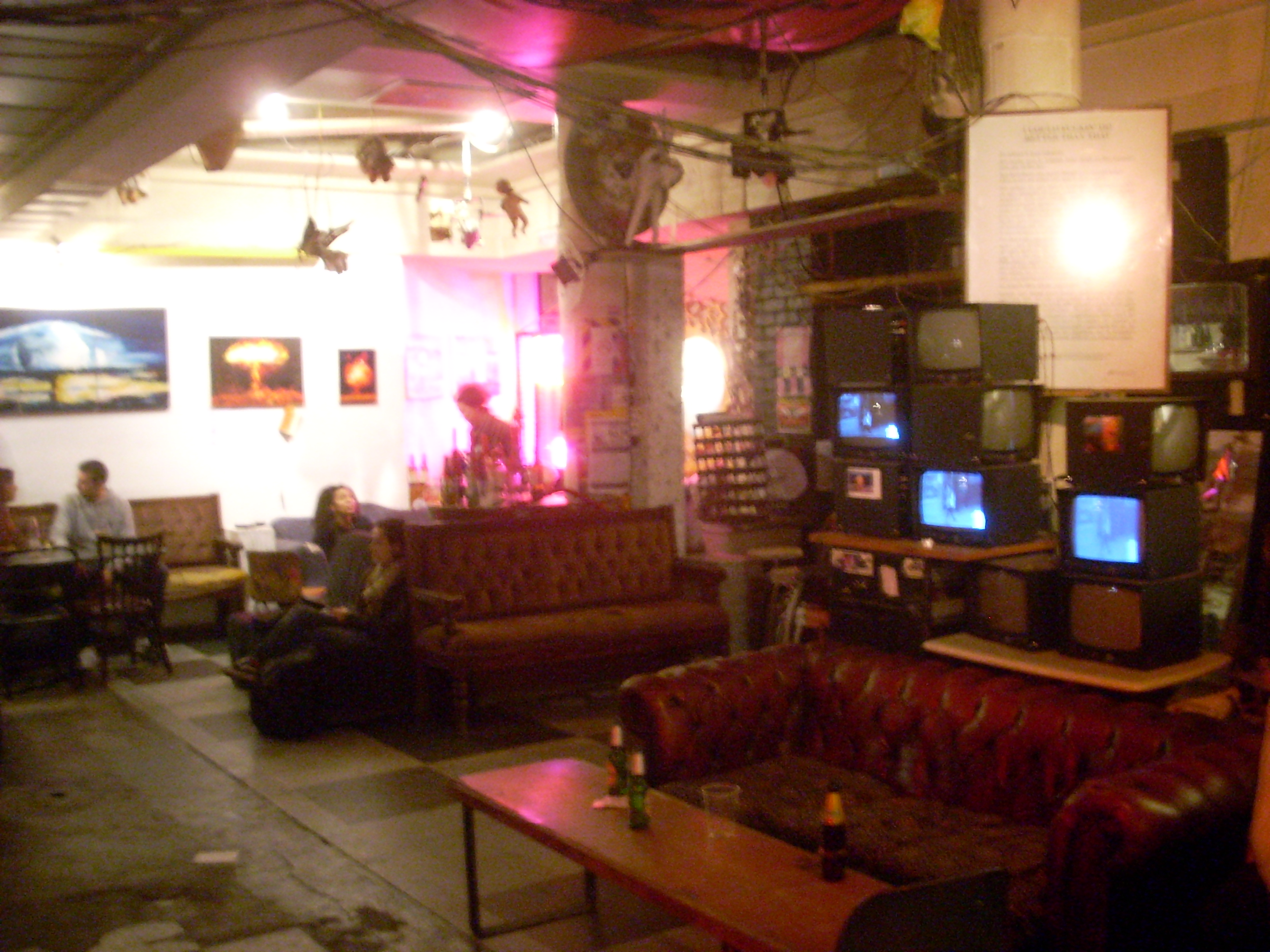
Inside the Foundry

The Foundry was a bar and venue on Great Eastern Street at the junction on Old Street, London. It was owned and run by Jonathan and Tracey Moberly. Bill Drummond, co-founder of The KLF, helped set up the Foundry. It had a basement which hosted art, music and poetry events. A weekly radio show, the foundry late late breakfast show, was broadcast live from the Foundry on Resonance 104.4 FM.

Once a Colombian DJ named Dani Boom played an iconic set on two turntables from scratched second hand and 90s techno vinyl. The bar closed down on May 31, 2010, as the building's owner intended to redevelop the whole block to include a 350-room hotel. The Foundry's manager is said to be looking to move to another location, possibly nearby.

== See also ==
- Tracey Moberly
