= Street choir =

Political or campaigning choir in UK

The term street choir can be used to refer to either a choir of homeless people such as the Berlin Strassenchor or to a political or campaigning choir, as in the UK. As the name suggests, some choirs sing on the street taking political issues and their campaigns to people in public spaces or members who live on the streets. However, not all choirs regularly sing on the street. Choirs are typically church or civil society ventures that do not have political objectives. Examples of street choirs that focus on homeless issues through campaigning are choirs like the Dallas Street choir.

== Political or campaigning choirs ==
UK street choirs typically have their roots in social movements. In the United Kingdom, an annual Street Choirs Festival is held in June or July over a weekend and is hosted by one or more choirs from the same town or city. The Street Choirs Festival grew out of the Street Bands Festival, the first recorded staging of which was in Sheffield in 1984.

== Choirs of homeless people ==
Choir of homeless people is a term for choirs across the world that are formed for two reasons: to raise the awareness of the homeless and to gather charities for the homeless. This way of charity became popular at the beginning of the 21st century mostly in Europe but also in America, Australia, Asia. Examples of homeless choirs are The Choir of Hard Knocks in Australia, San Diego Homeless choir, and the High Hopes Choir in Ireland.
