= The Magnificent (song) =

Song by the One World Orchestra featuring the Massed Pipes and Drums of the Children's Free Revolutionary Volunteer Guard

from the album The Help Album
- Released: 9 September 1995 (UK)
- Recorded: 4 September 1995
- Genre: Drum and bass
- Length: 2:12
- Label: Go! Discs Records
- Songwriters: Bill Drummond, Jimmy Cauty and Elmer Bernstein
- Producer: Drummond/Cauty

"The Magnificent" is a 1995 song by the One World Orchestra (Bill Drummond and Jimmy Cauty, better known as The KLF), recorded for the War Child charity compilation, The Help Album, which was released to raise funds for children affected by the Bosnian War. As with the other contributions to the album, it was recorded on 4 September 1995 and released five days later. It coincided with the screening of Drummond and Cauty's film about the K Foundation's burning of one-million British pounds, and the duo fielded questions from audiences relating the subjects.

The only song released by the duo under the One World Orchestra moniker, the song is a drum and bass-styled cover version of the theme music from The Magnificent Seven, with vocal contributions from the counter-culturist DJ Fleka of Serbian radio station B92, who agreed to participate after Drummond and Cauty's original idea of Robbie Williams was unavailable. Despite the duo's dislike of "The Magnificent", it was used by B92 as a jingle and, in 1996, it became recognised as a protest song against the Serbian government of Slobodan Milošević.

== Origins ==
In late summer 1995, Tony Crean of Go! Discs Records spoke with Bill Drummond about the proposed Help Album, a not-for-profit charity LP for children affected by the Bosnian conflict. Although Drummond claimed that the duo "despised the whole idea of people in the entertainment world getting publicly involved with charity", he and his KLF musical partner Jimmy Cauty nonetheless agreed to participate.

The turnaround time of the album's production, from its recording to its appearance in record shops, was a tight five-day schedule, with all recording to be complete by the end of the first day (4 September 1995). To produce the song, Drummond and Cauty re-assembled The KLF's regular production team: keyboardist Nick Coler, engineer Ian Richardson, and mixer Mark "Spike" Stent. Cauty had for some time been entertaining the notion of covering Elmer Bernstein's theme from The Magnificent Seven. According to Drummond, the duo envisaged crafting this alongside the vocals of Robbie Williams, recently sacked from the band Take That for his wayward behaviour in the presence of the paparazzi. Williams, however, was unavailable, holidaying in Turkey with his mother, and so due to the production deadline, this collaborative idea was abandoned.

"Serbia calling": B92 DJ Fleka was central to the composition.

An alternative vocal focus was found at short notice in Fleka (real name Miomir Grujić), a Belgradian counter-culturist well-known in Serbia "for his involvement in a huge variety of art, music and media projects dating back to 1980 and the communist regime of Tito". In 1995, Fleka was a late-night DJ for the subversive independent Serbian radio station B92, where he was a vocal critic of the incumbent Serbian president Slobodan Milošević. At the request of Drummond and Cauty, the duo recorded some phrases spoken down a phone line by Fleka: "This is Radio B92: Serbia calling. Message follows", and "Humans against killing: that sounds like a junkie against dope". In return for the contribution, Drummond and Cauty agreed to visit Serbia and appear on Fleka's radio show.

Fleka's words were incorporated into the track and, titled "The Magnificent", it was dispatched to Go! Discs, with Cauty and Drummond assuming the pseudonym 'One World Orchestra featuring the Massed Pipes and Drums of the Children's Free Revolutionary Volunteer Guard'. Although this was the first and only occasion on which the duo adopted the elaborate One World Orchestra name, Select magazine commented that "it was obvious to any close observer of pop" who was behind the composition.

Members of The Help Album production team planned for the One World Orchestra track to open the album, but this idea was vetoed by executive producer and War Child patron Brian Eno, who considered the song "too political" for that role; instead, "The Magnificent" was placed as track 15 of the album.

== Charity and money-burning ==
On 5 September 1995, as the K Foundation, Cauty and Drummond presented the first British screening of Watch the K Foundation Burn a Million Quid. Fielding questions from an audience oblivious to the duo's recent studio endeavours, they were asked whether they would make any more music, to which Drummond scoffed, "What do you expect us to do, go and make a jungle record?", and Cauty: "Yeah, like a jungle novelty record with some strings on it or something. It would just be sad wouldn't it? We're too old." When interviewed after the event by BBC Radio 1's Steve Lamacq, "The Magnificent" was aired, and the K Foundation revealed that they were going to screen Watch the K Foundation Burn a Million Quid in Belgrade's Republic Square the following week, motivated, according to Drummond, "to ask [the audience] if its [sic] a crime against humanity".

The film was shown as planned, powered by a hot dog kiosk and projected on to "a pair of double-sized white bed sheets" held up with drawing pins, in the absence of a suitable screen. An audience member told the duo:

In Yugoslavia nobody ever dreamt of wealth because it was not an option. There were no football pools, no national lottery, no rags-to-riches tales fuelling dreams of endless wealth. There was no need to dream of wealth, then—everybody had the same and the state took care of your needs.

According to Drummond, members of the audience applauded when Cauty obligingly burned a banknote of hyper-inflated Serbian currency.

During their stay in Belgrade the duo were guests for the duration of Fleka's three-hour late-night B92 show. Fleka aired "K Cera Cera", in comparison to which, Drummond felt, "["The Magnificent"] sounded pathetic. We had let the [Bosnian] children down". Nevertheless, the One World Orchestra song was donated to B92 for use as a jingle.

At a subsequent screening of Watch the K Foundation Burn a Million Quid for Bradford anarchists, Drummond and Cauty were challenged to reconcile their contribution to a charity record with their burning of a million pounds. Cauty's response was that "The Magnificent" "was a mistake; we should never have done that." Drummond agreed, elaborating:

[W]e'd been told that The Help Album was trying to raise a million quid. [W]e were attracted to the idea that on one side we were doing this track for the kids, to raise a million, while we were actually on the 'other side' showing the film of us actually burning a million and asking if it were a crime against humanity. For some twisted reason we felt that was good. … [W]e phoned up [B92] and asked [Fleka] if he'd got anything he'd like to say to the world via a charity record for kids in Bosnia. … Nothing justifies the track—it was a pile of shit but it did serve as a reminder why we should never go back in the studio again—'cos we knew we were past it….

Irrespective of the duo's regrets, "The Magnificent" was, by 1996, not just a jingle of B92 but the station's signature tune. From this use, the song ultimately became recognised as a protest anthem of Serbia's discontented anti-Milošević resistance. Recalling events in his book 45, Drummond mused that "a track we recorded in a day, never released as a single, thought was crap and had forgotten about has taken on a meaning, an importance in a 'far off land' for a struggle I hardly understand."

== Composition ==
"The Magnificent"
During this middle break, Fleka's potent sentiment is set against harmonious strings and low explosions, before a crescendo of drums and a reprise of The Magnificent Seven melody.

"The Magnificent" is a short composition, in keeping with the requirements of The Help Album's producers. According to the album's originator, Tony Crean, "We had trouble fitting all the tracks on—I had to tell the artists not to make their tracks longer than 3 minutes 45. ... [W]hen Bill Drummond told me The KLF (One World Orchestra) track was only two minutes, it was a cert."

The track is a cover version of The Magnificent Seven theme. Its tempo approximates that of the original tune, but whereas the original is percussively sparse, One World Orchestra's drum-oriented cover has a tempo in excess of 160 beats per minute, which is typical of drum 'n' bass tracks.

"The Magnificent" features no sung vocals, but uses sampled speech throughout, in the form of Fleka's contributions and, punctuating the track at points, a male voice announcing "The Magnificent!" – this vocal sample was taken from the introduction of the 1971 release "Double Barrel" by Dave and Ansil Collins. Recurring prominently are sounds of machine-gun, six shooter and artillery fire, a theme used regularly in The KLF's late singles (most overtly "What Time Is Love? (Live at Trancentral)", "3 a.m. Eternal (Live at the S.S.L.)" and a B-side, "America No More"). Police car sirens, used in the duo's "Doctorin' the Tardis" and "Build a Fire", also feature here. Both the gunfire and the sirens are fitted to rhythmically accentuate the fast tempo.

The song begins with Fleka's "This is Radio B92: Serbia calling", and launches into The Magnificent Seven melody on horn and string sounds, against a backdrop of gunfire that blends into fast drum machine patterns. During the two breaks, Fleka's "Humans against killing: that sounds like a junkie against dope" is backed first by the melody played on soft flutes, and second by a sequence of climactic string chords not present on the original theme. The speaker's separation from the listener is conveyed by the thick static interference that accompanies his words over the phone line. Fleka's sentiment—that humankind cannot control its urge to kill—offers insight into his perspective as a citizen within Milošević's regime.

== Reception ==
Select magazine called "The Magnificent" a "comic-epic cover". The Scotsman retrospectively extolled One World Orchestra's "wilfully provocative" offering as the "best of all" contributions to "one of the best compilations of the 1990s".

In 2002, the Glasgow Herald contrasted the career of Drummond with that of One World Orchestra's desired collaborator Robbie Williams: "In the shadow of EMI's multi-million pound marriage to Williams [reportedly worth the then unprecedented sum of £80m], Drummond's seemingly esoteric projects make complete sense and ooze relevance".
