= NME in Association with War Child Presents 1 Love =

Compilation album by various artists
- Released: 14 October 2002
- Recorded: 2002
- Genres: Pop, rock
- Label: B-Unique B00006RYKX
- Producer: Various

War Child charity albums chronology
The Help Album (1995)	NME in Association with War Child Presents 1 Love (2002)	Hope (2003)

NME in Association with War Child Presents 1 Love is a charity album by various artists. New Musical Express (better known as NME) is a popular music magazine in the United Kingdom which has been published weekly since March 1952.

The compilation features past number one hits covered by acts from the early 2000s and was released to mark the NME's 50th anniversary, 10 years on from their Ruby Trax compilation that had also followed this format.

War Child is a charitable organization that works with children affected by war in Iraq, Afghanistan, Democratic Republic of Congo and Uganda. War Child works with children who have been hit hardest by the joint forces of poverty, conflict, and social exclusion.

Other War Child albums include The Help Album (1995), Help!: A Day in the Life (2005), and War Child Presents Heroes (2009).

== Track listing ==
No.	Title	Writer(s)	Performed by	Length
1.	"All Or Nothing"	Steve Marriott, Ronnie Lane	Starsailor	3:07
2.	"The Power Of Love"	Holly Johnson, Peter Gill, Mark O'Toole, Brian Nash	Feeder	4:45
3.	"Killer"	Adam Tinley, Seal Henry Samuel	Sugababes	3:59
4.	"House Of The Rising Sun"	Traditional (arranged by Alan Price)	Muse	2:59
5.	"Nothing Compares 2 U"	Prince Rogers Nelson	Stereophonics	4:24
6.	"Dub Be Good To Me"	Harris, Lewis	Faithless & Dido	4:33
7.	"Merry Xmas Everybody"	Lea, Holder	Oasis	4:20
8.	"Something In The Air"	John David Percy Keen	Elbow	3:31
9.	"Back To Life (However Do You Want Me)"	Romeo, Wheeler, Hooper, Law	The Reelists featuring Ms. Dynamite	3:31
10.	"Out Of Time"	Jagger, Richards	Manic Street Preachers	3:31
11.	"Come On Eileen"	K Adams, J Patterson, K Rowland	Badly Drawn Boy with Jools Holland and his Rhythm & Blues Orchestra	3:59
12.	"Ghost Town"	Jerry Dammers	Prodigy	5:01
13.	"Firestarter"	A Dudley, G Langan, J Jeczalik, K Flint, K Deal, L Howlett, P Morley, T Horn	Jimmy Eat World	6:25
14.	"Pretty Flamingo"	Marcus H. Barkan	Darius	4:17
15.	"Dreams"	Gabrielle, Tim Laws	More Fire Crew featuring Gabrielle	3:44
16.	"Back For Good"	Gary Barlow	McAlmont & Butler	4:34
