= The Man (Bill Drummond album) =

Studio album by Bill Drummond
- Released: 1986
- Genre: Folk music
- Length: 33:35
- Label: Creation
- Producer: True Genius (Bill Drummond)

The Man is an album recorded and released by Scottish musician and music industry figure Bill Drummond in 1986.

== Context ==
In July 1986, Drummond had announced his resignation from his position as an A&R man at record label WEA, citing that he was nearly 33.3 years old (33.3 rpm being significant to Drummond as the speed at which a vinyl LP revolves), and that it was "time for a revolution in my life. There is a mountain to climb the hard way, and I want to see the world from the top... ". His first move was to record and release The Man, and an accompanying spoken-word diatribe "The Manager's Speech".

In an interview in December 1990, Drummond recalled spending half a million pounds at WEA on the band Brilliant—for whom he envisioned massive worldwide success—only for them to flop completely. "At that point I thought 'What am I doing this for?' and I got out. I did an album myself, wrote the songs in five days, recorded it in five days, and put it out on Creation Records". Creation's founder, Alan McGee, named The Man his 5th favourite LP: "Bill's my pal, but I thought his record would be crap. He gave a cassette to me and I didn't play it for ages. Then I put it on when I was in the bath one night—I nearly drowned. I laughed for about half an hour. It's the work of a complete nutter".

Drummond intended to focus on writing books once The Man had been issued but, as he recalled in 1990, "That only lasted three months, until I had an[other] idea for a record and got dragged back into it all". Calling upon Brilliant's former guitarist Jimmy Cauty, Drummond formed The Justified Ancients of Mu Mu with whom (most notably in their later incarnation as The KLF) he was to amass considerable fame and fortune until—in 1992—the cycle repeated itself and he quit the business once again.

== Songs ==
During the recording of the album, Drummond was assisted by members of the bands The Triffids and Voice of the Beehive.

In the sardonic "Julian Cope Is Dead", Drummond outlined his fantasy of shooting the Teardrop Explodes frontman in the head to ensure the band's early demise and subsequent legendary status. The song could be seen as a reply to the Cope song "Bill Drummond Said" (from Cope's Fried).

Bill Drummond is a self-confessed fan of Scottish football club Queen of the South. "Queen of the South" is also the title of the 6th track on "The Man". The song is an instrumental.

== Reviews ==
Professional ratings
Review scores
Source	Rating
Sounds	5/5 stars
Q	4/5 stars
Select	4/5 medals

Awarding the album five stars, Sounds called it a "touching if idiosyncratic biographical statement" and a "work of humble genius: the best kind".

Q Magazine gave the album four stars and described it as "a curious and hugely enjoyable set that trips from Tennessee twang to fake Scottish folk music to brash little pop tunes" whose lyrics "encapsulate [Drummond's] bizarrely sage ruminations on life, marriage, rock'n'roll and the sundry pop stars whose destinies have entwined with his own".

In a retrospective career summary review, Ira Robbins of Trouser Press referred to the album as "tastefully understated".

== Track listing ==
All songs written by Bill Drummond except "Going Back" (Gerry Goffin and Carole King) and "Such a Parcel of Rogues in a Nation" (words by Robert Burns, music traditional).

1. "True to the Trail"
2. "Ballad for a Sex God"
3. "Julian Cope Is Dead"
4. "I Want That Girl"
5. "Going Back"
6. "Queen of the South"
7. "I Believe in Rock and Roll"
8. "Married Man"
9. "I'm the King of Joy"
10. "Son of a Preacher Man"
11. "Such a Parcel of Rogues in a Nation"

== Personnel ==
- Bill Drummond – vocals
- Daniel Cainer – guitar
- Khiem Luu – clarinet, saxophone
- Nick Coler – piano, organ
- Allan MacDonald – drums
- Robert McComb – guitar, violin
- Graham Lee – pedal steel guitar
- Martyn Casey – "bull fiddle" (double bass)
- Jill Birt – Hammond organ
- Henry Lowther – trumpet
- Sandrae Lawrence – harmonies
- Voice of the Beehive – harmonies
- Stephen "Kid Chaos" Harris – "Rumblehammer" (bass)
- Rev. Jack Drummond (father of Bill Drummond) – voice on "Such a Parcel of Rogues in a Nation"
- Bleddyn Butcher – photography

All tracks arranged, produced and mixed by True Genius

== See also ==
- The KLF
- The KLF discography
- 45 - A book by Drummond, published as he reached the age of 45. A 7" record is usually played at 45 rpm.
