= No Music Day =

British protest day

No Music Day (21 November) is an event introduced by Bill Drummond to draw attention to the cheapening of music as an art form. Drummond explained "I decided I needed a day I could set aside to listen to no music whatsoever, [...] Instead, I would be thinking about what I wanted and what I didn't want from music. Not to blindly – or should that be deafly – consume what was on offer. A day where I could develop ideas."

The date of 21 November was chosen as it is the day before the feast of Saint Cecilia, the patron saint of music. This follows the traditional observance of antithetical events on the day before religious occasions, such as celebrating Mardi Gras before the start of Lent.

== No Music Day 2005–09 ==
No Music Day was most actively promoted by Bill Drummond and various organisations from 2005 to 2009; Drummond called it a five-year plan. It was launched in 2005 with a billboard poster at the entrance to the Mersey Tunnel, Liverpool. In 2006, the arts based radio station Resonance FM broadcast no music, as did BBC Radio Scotland in 2007.

No Music Day was promoted in São Paulo, Brazil in 2008, although Drummond has said that despite graffiti announcing the day, his efforts to apprehend buskers and to encourage music shops to close, he doubted that "there was even a fraction less music consumed in Brazil on the 21 November 2008 compared to any other day."

In 2009 the City of Linz, Austria observed No Music Day with the backing of the mayor and the Hörstadt (Acoustic City) initiative. Shops, restaurants, schools and radio stations in Linz played no music, the cinemas showed only films without music soundtracks and theatres and concert halls held only non-musical performances.
