= Street Choirs Festival =

Annual choir event in the UK

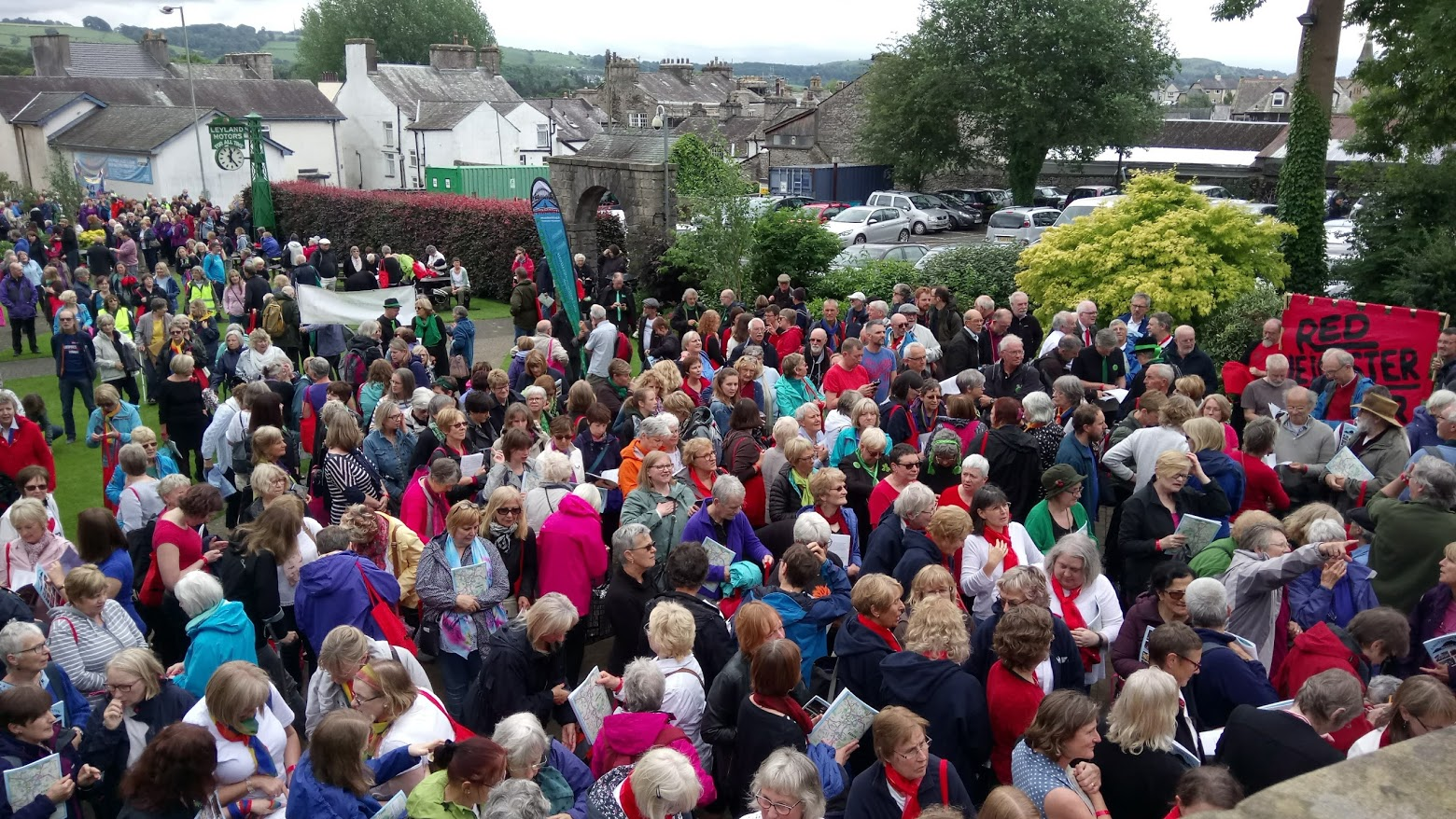
Singers gather for the massed sing at the Street Choirs Festival, Kendal, 2017

Street Choirs Festival is an annual event in which choirs in the UK meet and sing together. The festival is organised by volunteers and is hosted in a different location each year. The participating choirs learn a set of songs to sing together in an outdoor 'massed sing', followed by each choir busking at a variety of locations in the host town or city, usually outdoors. Most of the choirs sing a capella and many of the choirs sing political and campaign songs and songs of peace. In 2019, the festival gathered almost 1,100 singers in Manchester.

== History ==
The festival began in the 1984 as the National Street Band Festival, featuring music groups as well as choirs. The festival was renamed to the National Street Music Festival in 1991. In 1997, the event became choirs only, and in 2006, changed its name to the National Street Choirs Festival. To reflect the UK-wide nature of the festival, the name was changed to Street Choirs Festival in 2013. The 2013 festival also saw the birth of the Campaign Choirs Network, a group of choirs with a shared interest in political and social campaigning. A book, Singing for our Lives: Stories from the Street Choirs has been produced by a writing collective and contains stories about the festival and interviews with attendees about their motivations for and experiences of attending the festival and singing in their choir.

== Festival format ==
The festival typically runs over a weekend from Friday night to Sunday afternoon. The Friday night concert features invited musicians. Guest performers at the festival have included O'Hooley and Tidow (2014), Coope Boyes and Simpson (2017) and Barnstormer 1649 featuring Atilla the Stockbroker (2018). On Saturday morning, participating choirs rehearse together a set of 'massed sing' songs before performing the massed songs together as a massed choir, usually in a prominent outdoor location in the host town or city. The massed sing in Sheffield was on the steps of Sheffield City Hall, Brighton 2018 was on the seafront and Manchester 2020 was in Cathedral Gardens. In 2026, the festival was held in Scotland for the first time, hosted by three community choirs in Dumfries.

Busking forms an important feature of the festival. The participating choirs sing at designated locations in the host town or city on Saturday afternoon. A variety of workshops run on the Sunday morning, followed by a farewell picnic. It is a tradition to sing Billy Bragg's version of The Internationale either at the massed sing or at the farewell picnic.

== Festival Hosts ==
Year	Host city or Town	Host Choir	Name of the Festival
1984	Sheffield		National Street Band Festival
1985 (May)	Newcastle		National Street Band Festival
1985 (November)	Manchester		National Street Band Festival
1986	Bradford		National Street Band Festival
1987	Bristol		National Street Band Festival
1988	Liverpool		National Street Band Festival
1989	Leicester		National Street Band Festival
1990	Newcastle		National Street Band Festival
1991	London, Hackney	Big Red Band and Raised Voices	National Street Music Festival
1992	Sheffield	Sheffield Socialist Choir	National Street Music Festival
1993	Cardiff	Côr Cochion	National Street Music Festival
1994	Leeds	Leeds People's Choir	National Street Music Festival
1995	Stroud		National Street Music Festival
1996	Nottingham	Nottingham Clarion Choir	National Street Music Festival
1997	Morecambe		National Street Music Festival
1998	Leicester	Red Leicester	National Street Music Festival
1999	Bradford		National Street Music Festival
2000	Manchester		National Street Music Festival
2001	Nottingham	Nottingham Clarion Choir	National Street Music Festival
2002	Hebden Bridge	Calder Valley Voices	National Street Music Festival
2003	Belper	The Rough Truffles	National Street Music Festival
2004	Leeds	Leeds People's Choir	National Street Music Festival
2005	Saltaire/Shipley	Bradford Voices	National Street Music Festival
2006	Gateshead	Caedmon Choir and Heaton Voices	National Street Choirs Festival
2007	Manchester	Manchester Community Choir	National Street Choirs Festival
2008	Brighton	Hullabaloo Community Quire	National Street Choirs Festival
2009	Whitby	Whitby Community Choir	National Street Choirs Festival
2010	Sheffield	Out Aloud	National Street Choirs Festival
2011	Whitby	Whitby Community Choir	National Street Choirs Festival
2012	Bury	Bury Acapeelers Community Choir	National Street Choirs Festival
2013	Aberystwyth	Côr Gobaith	Street Choirs Festival
2014	Hebden Bridge	Calder Valley Voices	Street Choirs Festival
2015	Whitby	Whitby Community Choir	National Street Choirs Festival
2016	Leicester	Red Leicester	Street Choirs Festival
2017	Kendal	Lakeland Voices	Street Choirs Festival
2018	Brighton	Hullabaloo Community Quire	Street Choirs Festival
2019	Manchester	Manchester Community Choir	Street Choirs Festival
2020	Pocklington (Cancelled)	Cancelled	Street Choirs Festival
2021	Middlesbrough	No in person festival due to COVID19. Choirs invited to sing in their own locations.	Street Choirs Festival
2022	Whitby	Whitby Community Choir and Northern Chorus	Street Choirs Festival
2023	Kendal	Lakeland Voices	Street Choirs Festival
2024	Sheffield	Carfield Community Choir, Out Aloud and Sheffield Socialist Choir	Street Choirs Festival
2025	Bradford	Bradford Voices	Street Choirs Festival
2026	Dumfries	Cairn Chorus, SongWave and the CatStrand Singers	Street Choirs Festival
2027	Whitby	Whitby Community Choir	Street Choirs Festival
2028	Brighton		
