= 45 (book) =

2000 book by Bill Drummond

- Author: Bill Drummond
- Language: English
- Published: 2000
- Publisher: Little, Brown
- Publication place: UK
- Pages: 368
- ISBN: 0-316-85385-2
- OCLC: 42913110

45 is a non-fiction book by the Scottish artist and musician Bill Drummond of the electronic band the KLF, published by Little, Brown in 2000. It collects essays written by Drummond in 1997 and 1998.

== Reviews ==
45 was widely reviewed in the British press. The Times said that "It is usually a disaster when pop stars write books.... But Bill Drummond was never your average rock star", describing the book as "A series of loosely related vignettes forming the rambling diary of one year, it initially feels far removed from the scam-mongering stunts that we have come to expect. Drummond portrays himself as a shambling, absurd figure, saddled with the twin obsessions of pop music and art.... [he] has the inimitable wisdom of a true maverick." if Charles Shaar Murray wrote in The Independent that "[Bill] Drummond is many things, and one of those things is a magician. Many of his schemes - one example is described as "a private joke that's so private I don't even get it myself" - involve symbolically weighted acts conducted away from the public gaze and documented only by Drummond himself and his participating comrades. Nevertheless, they are intended to have an effect on a worldful of people unaware that the act in question has taken place. That is magical thinking. Art is magic, and so is pop. Bill Drummond is a cultural magician, and 45 is his logbook." A second review in The Independent added that "despite all the half-truths and self-effacing irony, and what Drummond calls "the incessant self- mythologising vanity", the stories in 45 strike me as peculiarly and sometimes painfully honest. It appears that, after all this time, he's decided it would be nice if his motives were understood. By himself at least. And if I'm wrong about that, 45 is still worth reading for the daft aphorisms - "Down escalators are one of the greatest inventions ever" - and all the situationist pranks involving dead cows, Stonehenge and money that never quite made the transition from Drummond's imagination to the real world."

The Guardian's Saturday Pages books section called 45 a "charmingly barking [mad] memoir". Steven Poole wrote in the same newspaper that "45 is a further attempt to bury the myth [of The KLF]. Throughout, Drummond poses as an ordinary middle-aged man who lives in the country, drinks lots of tea and spends his mornings in the nearest library, with coffee breaks in the shopping centre. Yet the myth motors on, pitilessly. When he goes to Serbia to appear on an underground music station, he brings a recording of an unreleased KLF song called The Magnificent. Soon it `had not only become the theme tune of the station [B92], but the anthem of the democracy movement . . . A track we recorded in a day, never released as a single, thought was crap and had forgotten about had taken on a meaning, an importance in a 'far-off land'.'" In summary, Poole said, "At its best [45] has flashes of twisted brilliance reminiscent of Iain Sinclair or Will Self, but the majority is most interesting because the author was one half of the KLF. Of course, that is more than enough glory for one lifetime. Yet the fact remains that this book will forever labour under the shadow of those horned men and their gleefully apocalyptic music."

== Editions ==
- ISBN 0-316-85385-2 (2000)
- ISBN 0-349-11289-4 (2001, reprinted 2006)
