= Bill Drummond =

Scottish artist and musician (born 1953)

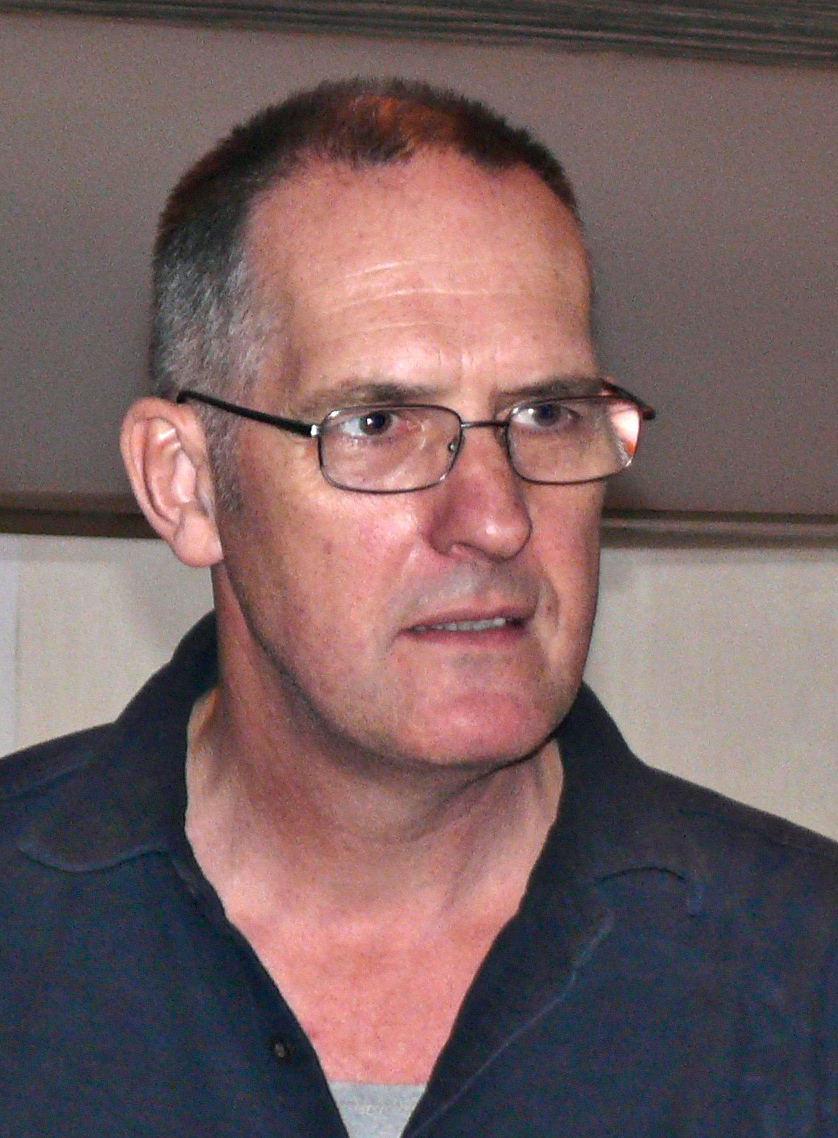
- Drummond in 2010
- Born: William Ernest Drummond; 29 April 1953 (age 73); Butterworth, Eastern Cape, South Africa
- Other names: King Boy Hard; King Boy D; Time Boy; Tenzing Scott Brown
- Education: University of Northampton; Art and Design Academy
- Occupations: Artist; writer; musician; music industry manager
- Years active: 1975–present
- Musical career
- Origin: Newton Stewart, Wigtownshire, Scotland
- Labels: Zoo; Korova; WEA; Creation; KLF Communications
- Member of: The KLF
- Website: Penkiln Burn; The 17; Mydeath

William Ernest Drummond (born 29 April 1953) is a Scottish artist, musician, writer, and record producer. He was a co-founder of the late-1980s avant-garde pop group the KLF and its 1990s media-manipulating successor, the K Foundation, with which he burned £1 million in 1994.

During their career, the KLF released four studio albums: 1987 (What the Fuck Is Going On?) (1987), Who Killed The JAMs? (1988), Chill Out (1990) and their most commercially successful album, The White Room (1991), which spawned internationally successful singles such as re–worked versions of "What Time Is Love?", "3 a.m. Eternal", "Last Train to Trancentral" and a new track, "Justified & Ancient" which featured American country singer Tammy Wynette.

Following their performance at the 1992 BRIT Awards, the KLF announced their departure from the music business and, in May of that year, they deleted their entire back catalogue. Although the duo remained true to their word of May 1992, with the KLF Communications catalogue remaining deleted, they have released a small number of new tracks since then, as the K Foundation, the One World Orchestra, and in 1997, as 2K. Drummond and Jimmy Cauty reappeared in 2017 as the Justified Ancients of Mu Mu, releasing the novel 2023, and rebooting an earlier campaign to build a "People's Pyramid". In January 2021, the band began uploading their previously deleted catalogue onto streaming services, in compilations.

More recent art activities, carried out under Drummond's banner of Penkiln Burn, include making and distributing cakes, soup, flowers, beds, and shoe-shines. More recent music projects include No Music Day and the international tour of a choir called The 17. Drummond is the author of several books about art and music.

== Early and personal life ==
William Ernest Drummond (Note: Drummond's full name is given in "Special K" by William Shaw, GQ magazine, April 1995.) was born in Butterworth, South Africa, (Note: A music encyclopaedia once mistakenly printed that Drummond was born William Butterworth not in Butterworth. This error has been reported, and Drummond's real name confirmed, by, for example, Scotland on Sunday.) where his father was a minister for the Church of Scotland. His family moved to Scotland when he was 18 months old, and his early years were spent in the town of Newton Stewart. He moved to Corby, Northamptonshire, at the age of 11. It was here that he first became involved in performing as a musician, initially working with schoolfriends such as Gary Carson and Chris Ward.

Drummond lived on the Beanfield Estate, where his father was the Minister of St. Ninian's Church of Scotland church. He attended Beanfield Secondary Modern School, gaining four O-levels, and later the sixth form of Kingswood School, from which he was expelled. He attended the Northampton School of Art and the Art and Design Academy from 1970 to 1973. He later decided that "art should use everything, be everywhere" and that, as an artist, he would "use whatever medium is to hand". He spent two years working as a milkman, gardener, steelworker, nursing assistant, theatre carpenter, and scene painter. He also worked on a trawler.

Drummond is a fan of Dumfriesshire football club Queen of the South, which he says is due to their proximity to his home town of Newton Stewart. "Queen of the South" is also the title of the sixth track on his 1986 album, The Man.

== Music career ==
=== 1970s: Illuminatus, Big in Japan, and Zoo ===
In 1975, Drummond began working at the Everyman Theatre in Liverpool as a carpenter and scene painter. In the following year he was the set designer for the first stage production of The Illuminatus Trilogy, a 12-hour performance which opened on 23 November 1976, and which was staged by Ken Campbell's "Science Fiction Theatre of Liverpool". The production transferred to the National Theatre, and then the Roundhouse, in London. According to Campbell, Drummond became known as "the man who went for Araldite": "In the middle of a tour, Drummond announced he was popping out to get some glue – and never returned." Drummond later wrote that none of his career would have happened as it did if not for what he learnt from Campbell, starting with the advice "Bill, don't bother doing anything unless it is heroic!"

After absconding from the Illuminatus! production in London, Drummond returned to Liverpool and co-founded the band Big in Japan. Other members included Holly Johnson (Frankie Goes to Hollywood), Budgie (Siouxsie and the Banshees), Jayne Casey (Pink Military/Pink Industry) and Ian Broudie (The Lightning Seeds). After the band's demise, Drummond and another member, his best friend David Balfe, founded Zoo Records. Zoo's first release was Big in Japan's posthumous EP, From Y To Z and Never Again. They went on to act as producers of the debut albums by Echo & the Bunnymen and The Teardrop Explodes, both of which Drummond would later manage somewhat idiosyncratically. With Zoo Music Ltd, Drummond and Balfe were also music publishers for Zodiac Mindwarp and The Love Reaction and The Proclaimers. The production team of Drummond and Balfe was christened The Chameleons, who recorded the single "Touch" together with singer Lori Lartey as Lori and the Chameleons and were involved with the production on Echo & the Bunnymen's debut album, released on the Korova label.

=== 1980s: A&R & solo artist ===
Drummond later took a job in the mainstream music business as an A&R consultant for the label WEA working with, amongst others, Strawberry Switchblade and Brilliant. In July 1986, on his 33 and a third birthday, Drummond repented his corporate involvement and resigned his job by way of a "ringingly quixotic press release": "I will be 33.5 (sic) years old in September, a time for a revolution in my life. There is a mountain to climb the hard way, and I want to see the world from the top..." (Note: Drummond's 1986 press release, quoted by Shaw in GQ magazine, April 1995) (In an interview in December 1990, Drummond recalled spending half a million pounds at WEA on the band Brilliant – for whom he envisioned massive worldwide success – only for them to completely flop. "At that point I thought 'What am I doing this for?' and I got out.")

Drummond was "obviously very sharp," said WEA chairman Rob Dickins, "and he knew the business. But he was too radical to be happy inside a corporate structure. He was better off working as an outsider."

Later in the year, Drummond issued a solo album, The Man, a country/folk music recording, backed by Australian rock group The Triffids. The album was released on Creation Records and included the sardonic "Julian Cope Is Dead", where he outlined his fantasy of shooting the Teardrop Explodes frontman in the head, to ensure the band's early demise and subsequent legendary status. The song has commonly been seen as a reply to the Cope song "Bill Drummond Said". Drummond wrote and performed "The Manager", filmed by Bill Butt in which he lamented the state of the music industry and offered his services at £100 a time to help fix it; one of his complaints was about remixes: "songs have to be written, not layered". The spoken-word recording also appeared as a B-side, and on some compilations as "The Manager's Speech".

The Man received positive reviews – including 4 stars from Q Magazine; and 5 from Sounds Magazine who called the album a "touching if idiosyncratic biographical statement". Drummond intended to focus on writing books once The Man had been issued but, as he recalled in 1990, "That only lasted three months, until I had an[other] idea for a record and got dragged back into it all".

=== 1987–1992: Commercial prominence and the KLF ===
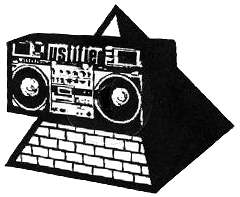
The KLF's "Pyramid Blaster" logo

While out walking on New Year's Day 1987, Drummond formulated a plan to make a hip-hop record. However, "I wasn't brave enough to go and do it myself", he said. "...although I can play the guitar, and I can knock out a few things on the piano, I knew nothing, personally, about the technology. And, I thought, I knew Jimmy, I knew he was a like spirit, we share similar tastes and backgrounds in music and things. So I phoned him up that day and said 'Let's form a band called The Justified Ancients of Mu-Mu'. And he knew exactly, to coin a phrase, 'where I was coming from'".

Drummond and Cauty (who Drummond had signed to Food/WEA as a member of Brilliant) released their first single, The Justified Ancients of Mu Mu's "All You Need Is Love", in March 1987. This was followed by an album – 1987 (What the Fuck Is Going On?) – in June of the same year, and a high-profile copyright dispute with ABBA and the Mechanical-Copyright Protection Society. A second album – Who Killed The JAMs?, also the last album under the Justified Ancients of Mu Mu (The JAMs) name, was released in February 1988.

Later in 1988, Drummond and Cauty released a 'novelty' pop single, "Doctorin' the Tardis" as The Timelords. The song reached number one in the UK Singles Chart on 12 June, and charted highly in Australia and New Zealand. On the back of this success, the duo self-published a book, The Manual (How to Have a Number One the Easy Way). In late 1988, the duo released their first singles under the moniker the KLF, "Burn the Bastards" and "Burn the Beat" (both taken from the JAMs' last album). (From late 1987, Drummond and Cauty's independent record label had been named "KLF Communications".) As the KLF, Drummond and Cauty would amass fame and fortune. "What Time Is Love?" – a signature song which they would revisit and revitalise several times in the coming years – saw its first release in July 1988, and its success spawned an album, The "What Time Is Love?" Story, in September 1989.

Chill Out, an ambient house album which had its roots in Cauty's chill-out sessions with The Orb's Alex Paterson, was released in February 1990. Described by The Times as "the KLF's comedown classic", Chill Out was named the fifth best dance album of all time in a 1996 Mixmag feature.

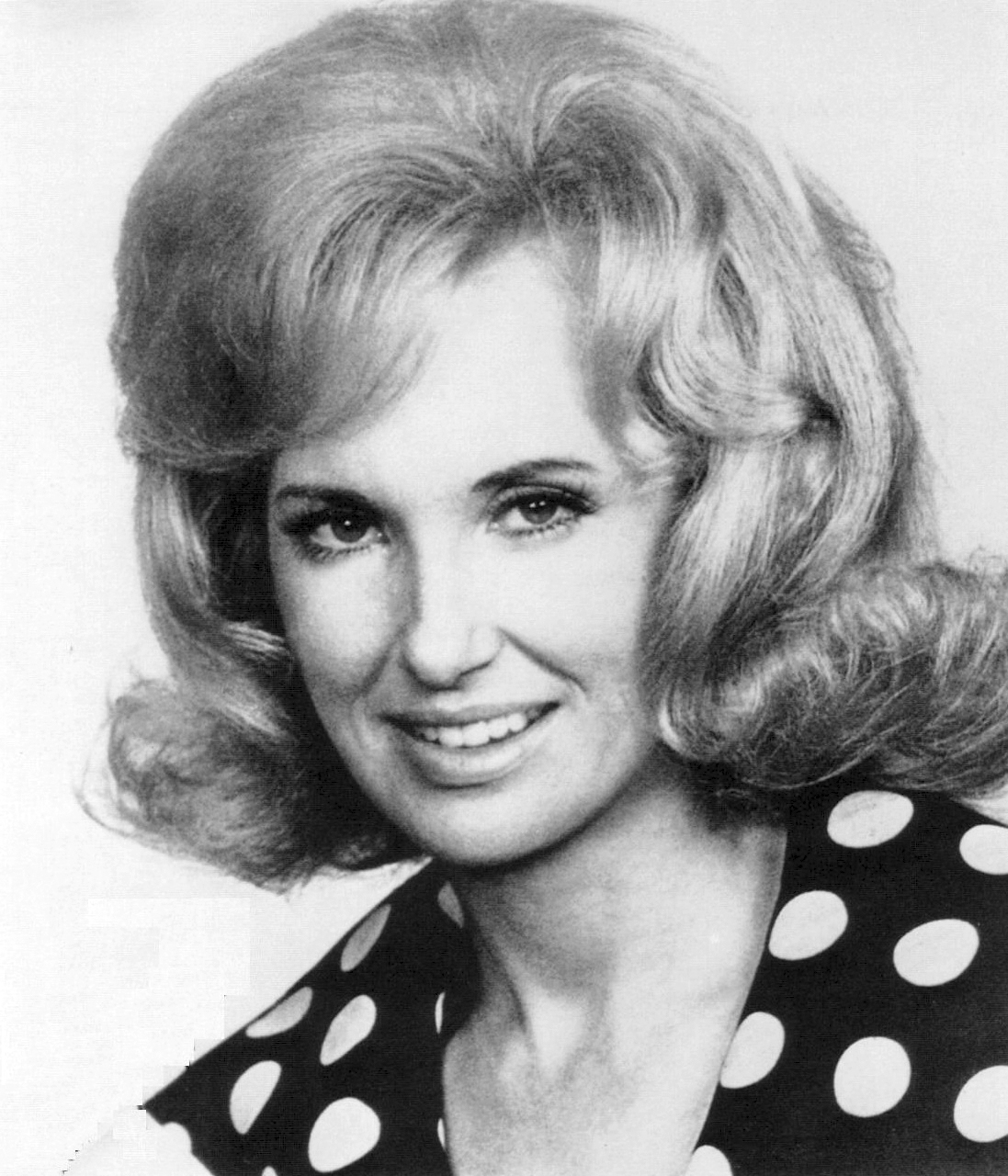
The KLF collaborated with Tammy Wynette on "Justified & Ancient", released in 1991 and became an international success

The KLF's commercial success peaked in 1991, with The White Room album and the accompanying "Stadium House" singles, remixes of 1988's "What Time Is Love?", 1989's "3 a.m. Eternal", 1990's "Last Train to Trancentral"; and "Justified and Ancient", a new song based on a sample from 1987 (What the Fuck Is Going On?) In 1992, The KLF were awarded the "Best British group" BRIT Award. With grindcore group Extreme Noise Terror, the KLF performed a live "violently antagonistic performance" of "3 a.m. Eternal" at the BRIT Awards ceremony in front of "a stunned music-business audience". Later in the evening Drummond and Cauty dumped a dead sheep at the entrance to one of the post-ceremony parties. NME listed this appearance at number 4 in their "top 100 rock moments", and, in 2003, The Observer named it the fifth greatest "publicity stunt" in the history of popular music.

On 14 May 1992, the KLF announced their immediate retirement from the music industry and the deletion of their entire back catalogue, an act which associate Scott Piering described as "[throwing] away a fortune". When he left WEA, Drummond issued an enigmatic press release, this time talking of a "wild and wounded, glum and glorious, shit but shining path" he and Cauty had been following "...these past five years. The last two of which has [sic] led us up onto the commercial high ground—we are at a point where the path is about to take a sharp turn from these sunny uplands down into a netherworld of we know not what." There have been numerous suggestions that in 1992 Drummond was at the edge of a nervous breakdown. Vox Magazine wrote, for example, that 1992 was "the year of Bill's 'breakdown', when the KLF, perched on the peak of greater-than-ever success, quit the music business, ... [and] machine gunned the tuxedo'd twats in the front row of that year's BRIT Awards ceremony." Drummond himself said that he was on the edge of the "abyss".

=== 1993–1997: K Foundation and other activities ===
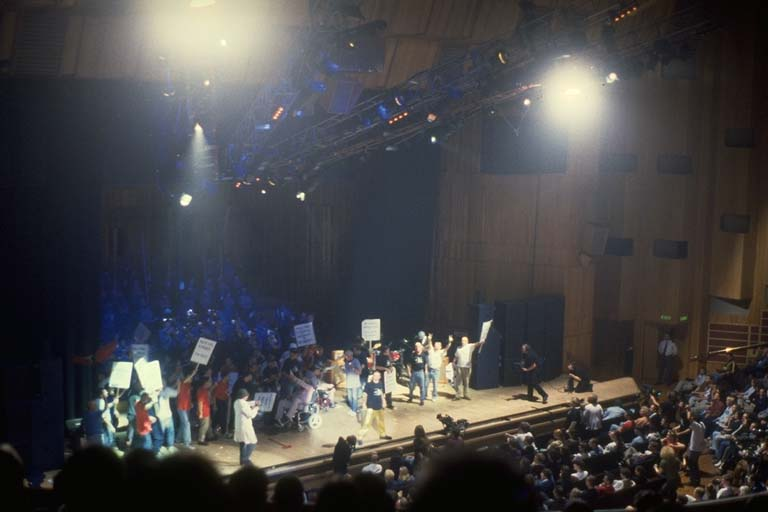
2K's performance at the Barbican Arts Centre, London, 1997

The KLF come out of retirement for 23 minutes to make an appearance as 2K.

Despite the KLF's retirement from the music business, Drummond's involvement with Jimmy Cauty was far from over. In 1993, the pair regrouped as the K Foundation, ostensibly a foundation for the arts. They established the K Foundation art award for the "worst artist of the year". The award, worth £40,000, was presented to Rachel Whiteread on 23 November 1993 outside London's Tate Gallery. Ms Whiteread had just accepted the £20,000 1993 Turner Prize award for best British Contemporary artist inside the gallery. The K Foundation award attracted huge interest from the British broadsheet newspapers. (Note: See K Foundation art award#Media and art-world reaction for some of the reports.)

Infamy followed when, on 23 August 1994, the K Foundation burnt what remained of the KLF's earnings, one million pounds, at a boathouse on the Scottish island of Jura. A film of the event – Watch the K Foundation Burn a Million Quid – was taken on tour, with Drummond and Cauty discussing the incineration with members of the public after each screening. In 2004 Drummond admitted to the BBC that he now regretted burning the money. "It's a hard one to explain to your kids and it doesn't get any easier. I wish I could explain why I did it so people would understand."

On 4 September 1995 the duo recorded "The Magnificent" for The Help Album. In 1997, Drummond and Cauty briefly re-emerged as 2K and K2 Plant Hire Ltd. with various plans to "Fuck the Millennium". K2 Plant Hire's published aim was to "build a massive pyramid containing one brick for every person born in the UK during the 20th century" Members of the public were urged to donate bricks, with 1.5 bricks per Briton being needed to complete the project. Drummond also contributed a short story titled "Let's Grind, or How K2 Plant Hire Ltd Went to Work" to the book "Disco 2000".

=== 1997–present: After the KLF ===
In 1996–1997 Bill Drummond did a music project in Finland, with Mark Manning and a selection of Finnish artists. Drummond's involvement in the music industry has been minimal since his final collaboration with Jimmy Cauty as 2K in 1997. In 1998, the Scottish Football Association invited Drummond to write and record a theme song for the Scotland national football team's 1998 FIFA World Cup campaign. Drummond decided against doing it (Del Amitri got the job) but he wondered if he had twisted fate by declining, because the other major football songs of that year were made by associates of his: Keith Allen ("Vindaloo") and Ian Broudie ("Three Lions"), two men he had met on the same day when working on Illuminatus! in 1976, and former protege Ian McCulloch.

In 2000, Drummond released 45, a book consisting of a "series of loosely related vignettes forming the rambling diary of one year". 45 also explored Drummond's KLF legacy, and was well received by the press. Drummond featured on Seeming's 2020 album The Birdwatcher's Guide to Atrocity, performing the spoken-word portion of "Learn to Vanish". It was his first appearance on record in 20 years.

Drummond reunited with Jimmy Cauty in 2017. They returned as The Justified Ancients of Mu Mu, with a novel – 2023: A Trilogy – and a 3-day event, "Welcome to the Dark Ages". Cauty confirmed that the duo's work is an ongoing project.

== Other ventures ==
=== Art ===
Drummond studied painting at Liverpool School of Art from 1972 to 1973. Following that, he decided that instead of limiting his practice to paint and canvas, as an artist he would use any medium that came to hand. He has said that much of his work since – including the pop-music, book-writing, and The17 choir – has been done as art. From 1998, Drummond's art activities have been carried out using the brand-name of the Penkiln Burn. This is the name of the river in Scotland upon the banks of which he played and fished as a boy.

In 1995, Drummond bought A Smell of Sulphur in the Wind by Richard Long, for $20,000. In Drummond's own words, he 'fell in love with Richard Long's work because' "it was art by walking and doing things on his walks." Five years later, Drummond felt that he was no longer "getting his money's worth" from the photograph. He decided to try to sell it by placing a series of placards around the country. When this failed to result in its sale, in 2001 he cut the photograph and mounting card into 20,000 pieces to sell for $1 each. His plan, upon retrieving the $20,000 in cash, is to walk with it to the remote place in Iceland where Richard Long had made the photograph and bury it in a box beneath the stone circle. He will then take his own photograph of the site, bring it home, frame it, hang it in the same place in his bedroom where the Richard Long hung, and call the new work The Smell of Money Underground. Drummond's books How to be an Artist and a later soft-bound edition titled $20,000 recounts this story.

In 2002, Drummond was involved in a controversial exhibition at the deconsecrated St. Peter's Roman Catholic Church, Liverpool. Drummond contributed a guestbook which asked visitors "Is God a Cunt?". It was later reported that the artwork had been stolen and a £1000 reward offered for its return. Drummond himself said that he would answer "no" to his own question: "God is responsible for all the things I love, the speckles on a brown trout; the sound of Angus Young's guitar, the nape of my girlfriend's neck, the song of the blackcap when he returns in Spring. I never blame God for all the shit, for the baby Rwandan slaughtered in a casual genocide, the ever-present wars, drudgery and misery that fills most of our lives."

Several Penkiln Burn projects involve making things and then distributing them. Drummond has created a Soup Line drawn across a map going through Belfast and Nottingham to the edges of the British Isles. Anyone living on the Soup Line may contact Drummond to come to their house and make soup for them, their family and friends. Drummond has also constructed – and encourages others to construct – Cake Circles drawn on maps. Cakes are then made and delivered to people who live within the circle with the words "I have baked you a cake, here it is". Other projects involve Drummond building beds from timber in public places which are then raffled off. In 2011, for the Venice Biennale, Drummond took up shoe-shining on the streets of Venice. Each spring, Drummond gives away 40 bunches of daffodils to strangers on the street in different cities. Drummond's web-based projects include MyDeath.net, where people can plan their own funeral. Another site, youwhores.com, was meant for anyone to advertise any kind of service at their own set price. Due to misuse though, youwhores.com has become archival only. Still open for contributions is Drummond's website www.openmanifesto.com which "exists to define what art is and art is not." The Open Manifesto site invites definitions of art in 100 words or less.

Drummond was a Director of The Foundry, an arts centre in Shoreditch, London which closed in 2010. He is also owner of The Curfew Tower in Cushendall, Northern Ireland. Via an arts trust called in You We Trust, the Curfew Tower acts as an artists' residency. In February 2014, Drummond announced plans for a world tour, beginning under Spaghetti Junction in Birmingham on 13 March 2014 and ending at the same place on 28 April 2025. Taking in twelve cities in twelve different countries, each leg of the tour will last three months, during which he will produce 25 paintings whilst working on other art projects.

=== No Music Day ===
In 2005, Drummond announced an annual No Music Day on 21 November. The 22 November is Saint Cecilia day – the Patron Saint of Music – so No Music Day represents a fast before the feast. No Music Day was held between 2005 and 2010. In this time, BBC Radio Scotland observed it by broadcasting no music, including jingles, for 24 hours. Radio Resonance FM also acknowledged it. In 2009 the entire city of Linz, Austria observed No Music Day with the backing of the city mayor; music was not played on local radio stations or in shops, and the cinemas only showed films without music soundtracks.

=== The 17 ===
Drummond's most recent music project is a choir, the 17. His first formal performance of The 17 was staged with 16 other men in a studio in Leicester in 2004. It followed thoughts about music that Drummond had been having for many years. With the advent of recorded music via the internet, iPods and MP3 players etc. Drummond proclaims that "all recorded music has run its course." The 17 creates music that follows no musical history, or necessarily has words, melodies or rhythms. It may be made up of many human voices or none. Performances may only be recorded and played back once and then deleted. The 17 can be made up of as many people who want to be a part of it at the time of a performance; they are all then lifetime members.

After the first 17 Scores for The 17 Drummond opened the writing process to collaborations with The 17 members. The 17 now has several thousand members who have carried out performances on Drummond's Coast-to-Coast tour across the UK, and a World Tour which has included Jerusalem, Beijing, Port-au-Prince and Gothenburg. 100 performances REPEAT in the town of Derby as a residency for the new Quad arts centre titled Slice Through Derby, were photographed as an ongoing exhibit at the gallery and published as a 100 piece photoset. Performances and actions in Port-au-Prince for the Ghetto Biennale at the end of 2009 preceded the January Haitian earthquake, and the habitual graffito "Imagine Waking Up Tomorrow And All Music Has Disappeared" took on a new resonance in a city with no electricity or infrastructure, rendered suddenly -relatively – musicless. Local artist Claudel Casseus wrote an account of this for Drummond during the reconstruction published as a book Imajine (Penkiln Burn 14, 2011), and Drummond's own feelings on the residency and the 17 actions, Haiti and the earthquake form four of the interview questions in Drummond's 100 project originally posed by Radio 4.

The 17 is the subject of the 2008 book 17 published by Beautiful Books/PB (Penkiln Burn 12, 2008). This was preceded by a small book SCORES 18–76 (Penkiln Burn 11, 2006) featuring the second batch of works by The 17, developed in actions in schools in the North East of England, in May 2006, Performances, scores, tours and Drummond's related graffiti are documented on a website: the17.org. In 2012 Drummond had a residency in Sheffield at Site Gallery, and the 17 were convened at sites around the city, the actions performed here are recounted in the book Ragworts (Penkiln Burn 18, 2012) and led to the instigation of the annual Ragwort Week. The book was published in an edition of 1000 copies, and 100 copies are made available each year and sold only during Ragwort Week. A performance of The 17's SURROUND, originally planned to take place in Damascus, Syria, took place in London on 18 March 2012. Drummond explains in his essay for Treuchet Magazine: 'it would best for all concerned if the Syrian leg of the tri-nation festival was postponed for a few weeks or maybe months, when things would have undoubtedly settled down'.

== Recognitions and legacy ==
In 1993, Select magazine published a list of the 100 Coolest People in Pop. Drummond was number one on the list. "What has this giant of coolness not achieved?", they asked: "Like the Monolith in 2001: A Space Odyssey, Drummond has always been a step ahead of human evolution, guiding us on. Manager of The Teardrop Explodes, co-inventor of ambient and trance house, number one pop star, situationist pagan, folk troubadour, pan-dimensional zenarchist gentleman of leisure...and then, ladies and gentlemen, he THROWS IT ALL AWAY, machine-guns the audience and dumps a dead sheep on the doorstep of the Brit Awards and vanishes to build dry-stone walls. His new 'band' The K Foundation make records but say they won't release them at all until world peace is established. Deranged, inspired, intensely cool."

Also in 1993, an NME piece about the K Foundation found much to praise in Drummond's career, from Zoo Records through to the K Foundation art award: "Bill Drummond's career is like no other... there's been cynicism... and there's been care (no one who didn't love pop music could have made a record so commercial and so Pet Shop Boys-lovely as 'Kylie Said to Jason', or the madly wonderful 'Last Train to Trancentral', or the Tammy Wynette version of 'Justified and Ancient'). There's been mysticism... But most of all there's been a belief that, both in music and life, there's something more." Charles Shaar Murray wrote in The Independent that "[Bill] Drummond is many things, and one of those things is a magician. Many of his schemes... involve symbolically-weighted acts conducted away from the public gaze and documented only by Drummond himself and his participating comrades. Nevertheless, they are intended to have an effect on a worldful of people unaware that the act in question has taken place. That is magical thinking. Art is magic, and so is pop. Bill Drummond is a cultural magician..."

In 2001, NME readers voted "the KLF's Art Terrorism" at the Brit Awards in 1992 at number 4 in the "top 100 Rock moments of all time." NME also ranked Drummond as number 17 in its 20 "Greatest Cult Heroes" in 2010. Art Review's artworld "Power 100" listed Drummond as number 98 in 2003. Trouser Press has referred to Drummond as a "high-concept joker". In 2006, Drummond's book 45 was ranked 21 in the Observer's list of "The 50 greatest music books ever". Kitty Empire of the Guardian included 45 in her list of "10 best music memoirs". in 2010. 45 also featured in a 2010 book list compiled by Belle & Sebastian. BBC Radio 1 in 2006 included Drummond in a survey of "Most Punk Persons". Virgin Media ranked Drummond at number 8 in a list of "Most Eccentric Musicians". Julian Cope said in 2000, "I have no relationship with this guy. He burned a million pounds which was not all his, and some of it was mine. People should pay off their creditors before they pull intellectual dry-wank stunts like that." Drummond's 1986 solo album The Man is among Uncut Magazine's 2010 list of "Greatest Lost Albums".

== Discography ==
=== Solo ===
==== Albums ====
- The Man (Creation, 1986)

==== Singles ====
- The King of Joy (Creation, 1987)

== Exhibitions ==
- How to Be an Artist (OUTPOST, Norwich, 2004)
- Ragworts (Site Gallery, Sheffield, 2012)
- The 25 Paintings (Eastside Projects, Birmingham, 2014)

== Bibliography ==
- The Manual (How to Have a Number One the Easy Way), with Jimmy Cauty as The Timelords (KLF Publications, 1988) ISBN 0-86359-616-9
- A Bible of Dreams, with Mark Manning (Curfew Press, 1994)
- Bad Wisdom, with Mark Manning (Penguin Books, 1996; Creation Books, 2003) ISBN 978-0-14-026118-9
- From the Shores of Lake Placid and other stories (Ellipsis, 1998) ISBN 978-1-84166-000-4
- Annual Report to the Mavericks, Writers and Film Festival (Penkiln Burn, 1998) ISBN 978-1-84166-001-1
- 45 (Little Brown/Penkiln Burn, 2000) ISBN 0-316-85385-2
- How to Be an Artist (Penkiln Burn, 2002) ISBN 978-0-9541656-0-4
- Wild Highway, with Mark Manning (Creation Books, 2005) ISBN 978-1-84068-116-1
- Scores 18–76 (Penkiln Burn, 2006)
- 17 (Beautiful Books, 2008). ISBN 978-1-905636-26-6.
- $20,000 (Penkiln Burn, 2010 – second edition of How To Be An Artist) (Beautiful Books Limited (UK), 2010) ISBN 978-1-905636-84-6.
- Man Makes Bed (Penkiln Burn 2011)
- Imajine by Claudel Casseus with Introduction by Bill Drummond (Penkiln Burn, 2011) ISBN 978-1-908238-24-5
- Man Shines Shoes (Penkiln Burn, 2011)
- Ragworts (Penkiln Burn, 2012) ISBN 978-0-9541656-7-3
- 100 (Penkiln Burn, 2012) ISBN 978-0-9541656-6-6
- The 25 Paintings (Penkiln Burn, 2014) ISBN 978-0-9541656-9-7
- Bill Drummond – Lecture at Spoiler, Vienna 2002. (Robert Jelinek, Ed.) Der Konterfei 011, 2015, ISBN 978-3-903043-00-8
- Missionary or Cannibal? (Penkiln Burn/Blurb, Inc., 2015) ISBN 978-1-320-48877-8
- 2023: A Trilogy, with Jimmy Cauty as The Justified Ancients of Mu Mu (Faber and Faber, 2017) ISBN 978-0-571-33808-5
- As Tenzing Scott Brown: White Saviour Complex, a play (Penkiln Burn, 2019) ISBN 978-1-9161435-0-0
