= List of songs recorded by Radiohead =

Songs by English rock band

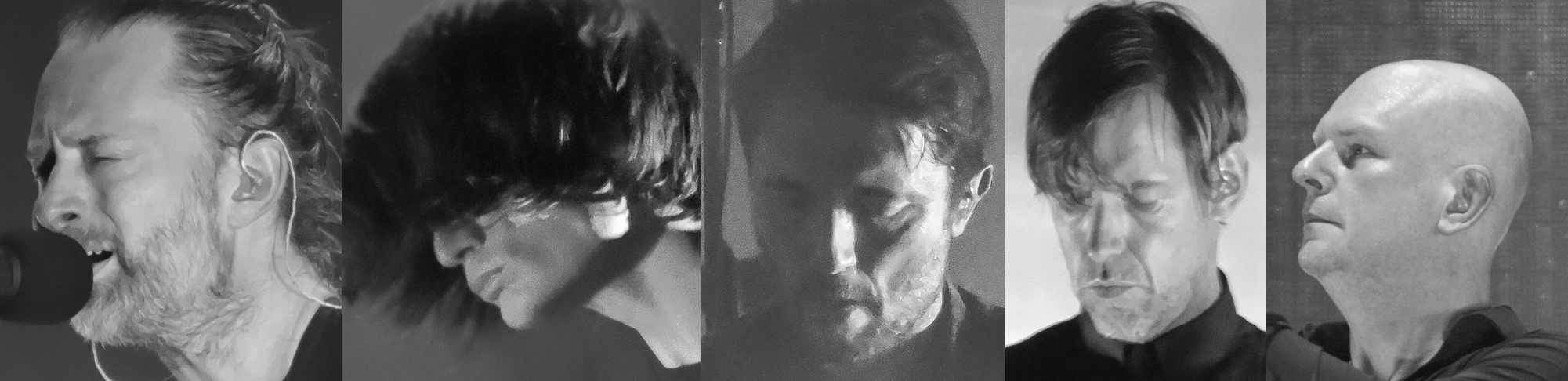
Radiohead in the mid-2010s. From left: Thom Yorke, Jonny Greenwood, Colin Greenwood, Ed O'Brien and Philip Selway

Since their 1992 debut, the English rock band Radiohead have recorded more than 160 songs, most credited to the band as a whole. They have worked with the producer Nigel Godrich since 1994. Several of their albums are consistently ranked among the greatest of all time.

Radiohead's first album, Pablo Honey (1993), preceded by their breakthrough single "Creep", features a sound reminiscent of alternative rock bands such as the Pixies and Nirvana. The Bends (1995) marked a move toward "anthemic rock", with more cryptic lyrics about social and global topics, and elements of Britpop. OK Computer (1997), the first Radiohead album produced by Godrich, features more abstract lyrics that reflected themes of modern alienation, and subtle, complex and textured songs.

Kid A (2000) and Amnesiac (2001), recorded in the same sessions, marked a drastic change in style, incorporating influences from electronic music, 20th-century classical music, krautrock and jazz. Radiohead's sixth album, Hail to the Thief (2003), combines electronic and rock music with lyrics written in response to the war on terror. Radiohead self-released their seventh album, In Rainbows (2007), as a pay-what-you-want download. It incorporates alternative rock and art pop with more personal, "universal" lyrics. Outtakes from the album were released on In Rainbows Disk 2 (2007). In 2009, Radiohead released two non-album singles: "Harry Patch (In Memory Of)", a tribute to the last surviving World War I soldier Harry Patch, and "These Are My Twisted Words", a free download.

Radiohead's eighth album, The King of Limbs (2011), emphasises the rhythm section with extensive samples and loops. The band released four non-album singles in 2011: "Supercollider" and "The Butcher", followed by "The Daily Mail" and "Staircase". After a hiatus, Radiohead recorded a title song for the 2015 James Bond film Spectre, but it was rejected. Their next album, A Moon Shaped Pool (2016), incorporates art rock and ambient music, with string and choral arrangements performed by the London Contemporary Orchestra. In 2017, Radiohead released a deluxe remaster of OK Computer, OKNOTOK 1997 2017, including B-sides and the previously unreleased songs "I Promise", "Man of War", and "Lift". Kid A Mnesia, an anniversary reissue compiling Kid A, Amnesiac and previously unreleased material, was released on 5 November 2021.

== Songs ==
All songs written by Thom Yorke, Jonny Greenwood, Colin Greenwood, Ed O'Brien and Philip Selway, except where noted.

Key
Indicates song not produced or co-produced by Nigel Godrich

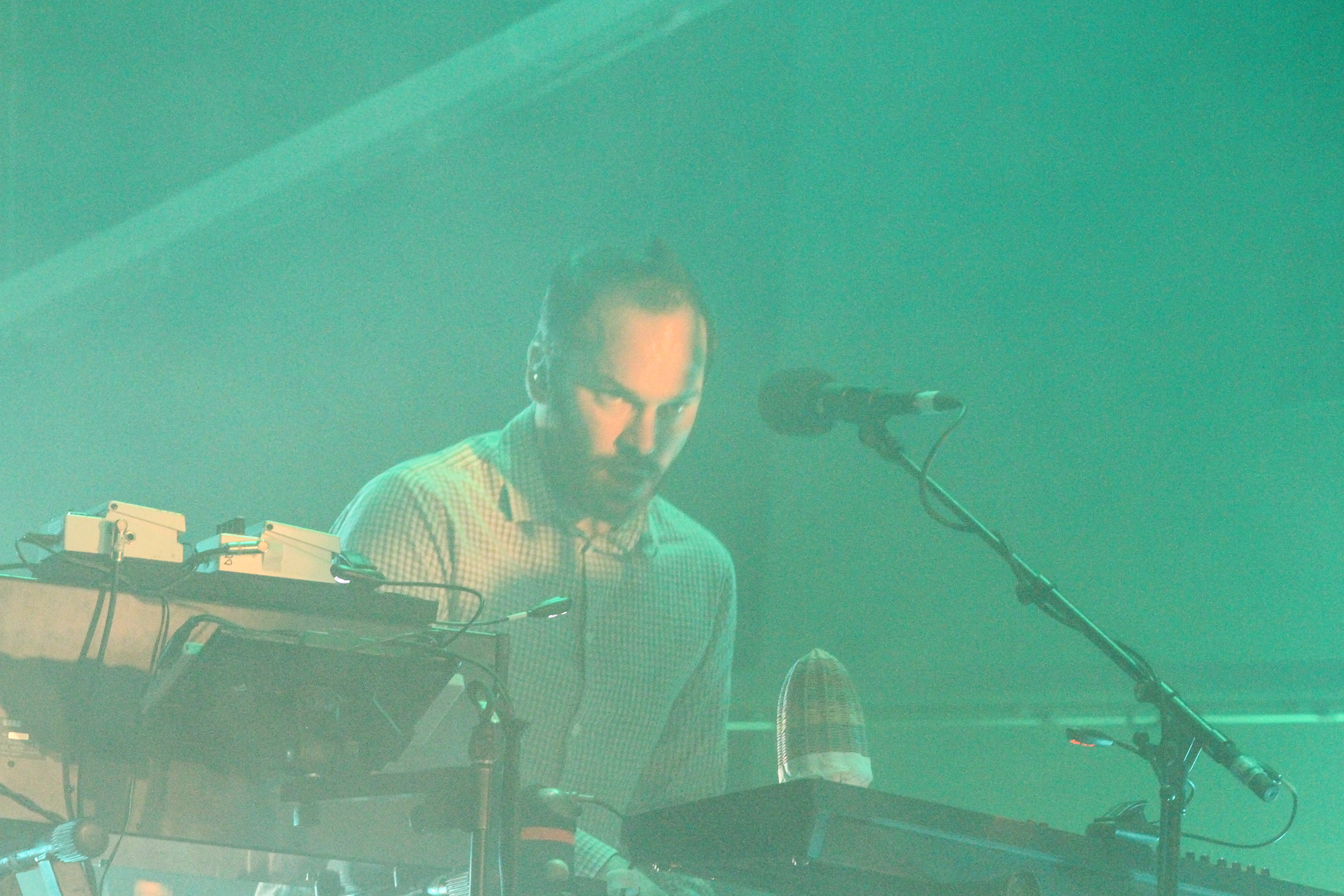
Radiohead first worked with producer Nigel Godrich in 1994, when he produced some songs on the My Iron Lung EP (1994). He has produced every Radiohead release since their third album, OK Computer (1997).

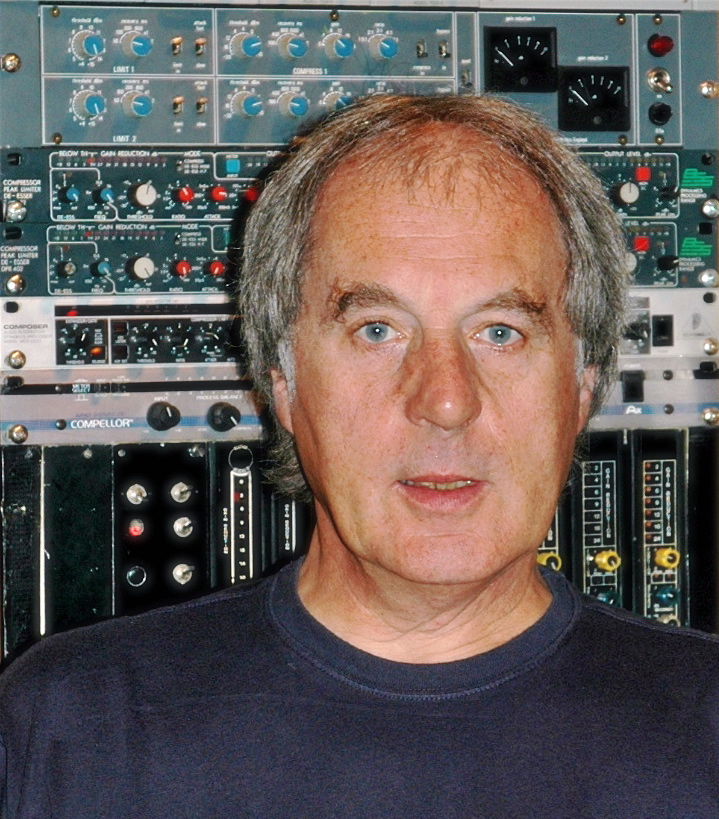
John Leckie produced Radiohead's second album, The Bends (1995).

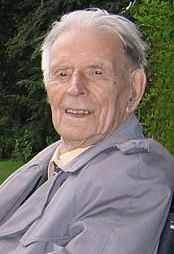
"Harry Patch (In Memory Of)" is a tribute to the last surviving World War I combat soldier, Harry Patch.

Song	Original release	Producers	Year	Ref.
"15 Step"	In Rainbows	Nigel Godrich	2007	
"2 + 2 = 5"	Hail to the Thief	Nigel Godrich; Radiohead	2003	
"4 Minute Warning"	In Rainbows Disk 2	Nigel Godrich	2007	
"Airbag"	OK Computer	Nigel Godrich; Radiohead	1997	
"All I Need"	In Rainbows	Nigel Godrich	2007	
"The Amazing Sounds of Orgy"	B-side to "Pyramid Song" (CD1)	Nigel Godrich; Radiohead	2001	
"Anyone Can Play Guitar"	Pablo Honey	Sean Slade; Paul Q. Kolderie	1993	
"Backdrifts"	Hail to the Thief	Nigel Godrich; Radiohead	2003	
"Banana Co." (Note: Studio recording later released as a B-side to "Street Spirit (Fade Out)" (CD2) (1996)) (live)	B-side to "Pop Is Dead"	Radiohead; Jim Warren	1993	
"Bangers + Mash"	In Rainbows Disk 2	Nigel Godrich	2007	
"The Bends"	The Bends	John Leckie	1995	
"Bishop's Robes"	B-side to "Street Spirit (Fade Out)" (CD1)	John Leckie	1996	
"Black Star"	The Bends	Radiohead; Nigel Godrich; John Leckie	1995	
"Bloom"	The King of Limbs	Nigel Godrich	2011	
"Blow Out"	Pablo Honey	Sean Slade; Paul Q. Kolderie	1993	
"Bodysnatchers"	In Rainbows	Nigel Godrich	2007	
"Bones"	The Bends	John Leckie	1995	
"Bullet Proof..I Wish I Was"	The Bends	John Leckie	1995	
"Burn the Witch"	A Moon Shaped Pool	Nigel Godrich	2016	
"The Butcher"	Non-album single	Nigel Godrich; Radiohead	2011	
"Climbing Up the Walls"	OK Computer	Nigel Godrich; Radiohead	1997	
"Codex"	The King of Limbs	Nigel Godrich	2011	
"Coke Babies"	B-side to "Anyone Can Play Guitar"	Jim Warren; Chris Hufford	1993	
"Creep" (Note: Written by Radiohead, Mike Hazlewood, and Albert Hammond)	Pablo Honey	Sean Slade; Paul Q. Kolderie	1993	
"Cuttooth"	B-side to "Knives Out" (CD1)	Nigel Godrich; Radiohead	2001	
"The Daily Mail"	The King of Limbs: Live from the Basement	Nigel Godrich; Radiohead	2011	
"Daydreaming"	A Moon Shaped Pool	Nigel Godrich	2016	
"Decks Dark"	A Moon Shaped Pool	Nigel Godrich	2016	
"Desert Island Disk"	A Moon Shaped Pool	Nigel Godrich	2016	
"Dollars and Cents"	Amnesiac	Nigel Godrich; Radiohead	2001	
"Down Is the New Up"	In Rainbows Disk 2	Nigel Godrich	2007	
"Electioneering"	OK Computer	Nigel Godrich; Radiohead	1997	
"Everything in Its Right Place"	Kid A	Nigel Godrich; Radiohead	2000	
"Exit Music (For a Film)"	OK Computer	Nigel Godrich; Radiohead	1997	
"Faithless, the Wonder Boy"	B-side to "Anyone Can Play Guitar"	Jim Warren; Chris Hufford	1993	
"Fake Plastic Trees"	The Bends	John Leckie	1995	
"Fast-Track"	B-side to "Pyramid Song" (CD2)	Nigel Godrich; Radiohead	2001	
"Faust Arp"	In Rainbows	Nigel Godrich	2007	
"Feral"	The King of Limbs	Nigel Godrich	2011	
"Fitter Happier"	OK Computer	Nigel Godrich; Radiohead	1997	
"Fog"	B-side to "Knives Out" (CD2)	Nigel Godrich; Radiohead	2001	
"Follow Me Around"	Kid A Mnesia	Nigel Godrich; Radiohead	2021	
"Ful Stop"	A Moon Shaped Pool	Nigel Godrich	2016	
"Gagging Order" (Note: Later released on Com Lag (2plus2isfive) (2004))	B-side to "Go to Sleep" (CD2)	Radiohead	2003	
"Give Up the Ghost"	The King of Limbs	Nigel Godrich	2011	
"Glass Eyes"	A Moon Shaped Pool	Nigel Godrich	2016	
"The Gloaming"	Hail to the Thief	Nigel Godrich; Radiohead	2003	
"Go Slowly"	In Rainbows Disk 2	Nigel Godrich	2007	
"Go to Sleep"	Hail to the Thief	Nigel Godrich; Radiohead	2003	
"Harry Patch (In Memory Of)"	Non-album single	Nigel Godrich	2009	
"High and Dry"	The Bends	Radiohead; Jim Warren ‡	1995	
"House of Cards"	In Rainbows	Nigel Godrich	2007	
"How Can You Be Sure?"	B-side to "Fake Plastic Trees"	John Leckie	1995	
"How Do You?"	Pablo Honey	Sean Slade; Paul Q. Kolderie	1993	
"How I Made My Millions"	B-side to "No Surprises"	Nigel Godrich; Radiohead	1998	
"How to Disappear Completely"	Kid A	Nigel Godrich; Radiohead	2000	
"Hunting Bears"	Amnesiac	Nigel Godrich; Radiohead	2001	
"I Am a Wicked Child"	B-side to "Go to Sleep" (CD2)	Radiohead	2003	
"I Am Citizen Insane"	B-side to "Go to Sleep" (CD1)	Radiohead	2003	
"I Can't"	Pablo Honey	Chris Hufford	1993	
"I Might Be Wrong"	Amnesiac	Nigel Godrich; Radiohead	2001	
"I Promise"	OK Computer OKNOTOK 1997 2017	Nigel Godrich; Radiohead	2017	
"I Want None of This"	Help!: A Day in the Life	Nigel Godrich	2005	
"I Will"	Hail to the Thief	Nigel Godrich; Radiohead	2003	
"Identikit"	A Moon Shaped Pool	Nigel Godrich	2016	
"Idioteque" (Note: Written by Radiohead, Paul Lansky, and Arthur Kreiger)	Kid A	Nigel Godrich; Radiohead	2000	
"If You Say the Word"	Kid A Mnesia	Nigel Godrich; Radiohead	2021	
"Ill Wind"	A Moon Shaped Pool (special edition)	Nigel Godrich	2016	
"In Limbo"	Kid A	Nigel Godrich; Radiohead	2000	
"India Rubber"	B-side to "Fake Plastic Trees"	Radiohead	1995	
"Inside My Head"	B-side to "Creep"	Sean Slade; Paul Q. Kolderie	1992	
"Jigsaw Falling into Place"	In Rainbows	Nigel Godrich	2007	
"Just"	The Bends	John Leckie	1995	
"Karma Police"	OK Computer	Nigel Godrich; Radiohead	1997	
"Kid A"	Kid A	Nigel Godrich; Radiohead	2000	
"Killer Cars"	B-side to "Planet Telex" / "High and Dry" (CD2)	John Leckie	1995	
"Kinetic"	B-side to "Pyramid Song" (CD2)	Nigel Godrich; Radiohead	2001	
"Knives Out"	Amnesiac	Nigel Godrich; Radiohead	2001	
"Last Flowers"	In Rainbows Disk 2	Nigel Godrich	2007	
"Let Down"	OK Computer	Nigel Godrich; Radiohead	1997	
"Lewis (Mistreated)"	My Iron Lung	John Leckie	1994	
"Life in a Glasshouse"	Amnesiac	Nigel Godrich; Radiohead	2001	
"Lift"	OK Computer OKNOTOK 1997 2017	Nigel Godrich; Radiohead	2017	
"Like Spinning Plates"	Amnesiac	Nigel Godrich; Radiohead	2001	
"Little by Little"	The King of Limbs	Nigel Godrich	2011	
"Lotus Flower"	The King of Limbs	Nigel Godrich	2011	
"Lozenge of Love"	My Iron Lung	John Leckie	1994	
"Lucky" (Note: Later released on OK Computer (1997))	The Help Album	Nigel Godrich	1995	
"Lull"	B-side to "Karma Police"	Nigel Godrich; Radiohead	1997	
"Lurgee"	Pablo Honey	Chris Hufford	1993	
"Man of War"	OK Computer OKNOTOK 1997 2017	Nigel Godrich; Radiohead	2017	
"Maquiladora"	B-side to "Planet Telex" / "High and Dry" (CD1)	John Leckie	1995	
"Meeting in the Aisle" (Note: Later released on Airbag / How Am I Driving? (1998))	B-side to "Karma Police"	Nigel Godrich; Radiohead	1997	
"Melatonin"	B-side to "Paranoid Android" (CD2)	Nigel Godrich; Radiohead	1997	
"Million Dollar Question"	B-side to "Creep"	Sean Slade; Paul Q. Kolderie	1992	
"MK 1"	In Rainbows Disk 2	Nigel Godrich	2007	
"MK 2"	In Rainbows Disk 2	Nigel Godrich	2007	
"Molasses"	B-side to "Street Spirit (Fade Out)" (CD2)	Nigel Godrich; Radiohead	1996	
"Morning Bell"	Kid A	Nigel Godrich; Radiohead	2000	
"Morning Bell/Amnesiac"	Amnesiac	Nigel Godrich; Radiohead	2001	
"Morning Mr Magpie"	The King of Limbs	Nigel Godrich	2011	
"Motion Picture Soundtrack"	Kid A	Nigel Godrich; Radiohead	2000	
"My Iron Lung"	The Bends	John Leckie	1995	
"Myxomatosis"	Hail to the Thief	Nigel Godrich; Radiohead	2003	
"The National Anthem"	Kid A	Nigel Godrich; Radiohead	2000	
"(Nice Dream)"	The Bends	John Leckie	1995	
"No Surprises"	OK Computer	Nigel Godrich; Radiohead	1997	
"Nothing Touches Me"	Pablo Honey (collector's edition)	Sean Slade; Paul Q. Kolderie	2009	
"Nude"	In Rainbows	Nigel Godrich	2007	
"The Numbers"	A Moon Shaped Pool	Nigel Godrich	2016	
"Optimistic"	Kid A	Nigel Godrich; Radiohead	2000	
"Packt Like Sardines in a Crushd Tin Box"	Amnesiac	Nigel Godrich; Radiohead	2001	
"Palo Alto"	B-side to "No Surprises"	Nigel Godrich; Radiohead	1998	
"Paperbag Writer"	B-side to "There There"	Nigel Godrich; Radiohead	2003	
"Paranoid Android"	OK Computer	Nigel Godrich; Radiohead	1997	
"Pearly*"	B-side to "Paranoid Android" (CD1)	Nigel Godrich; Radiohead	1997	
"Permanent Daylight"	My Iron Lung	Nigel Godrich; Radiohead	1994	
"Planet Telex"	The Bends	John Leckie	1995	
"Polyethylene (Parts 1 & 2)"	B-side to "Paranoid Android" (CD1)	Nigel Godrich; Radiohead	1997	
"Pop Is Dead"	Non-album single	Jim Warren; Radiohead	1993	
"Present Tense"	A Moon Shaped Pool	Nigel Godrich	2016	
"Prove Yourself" (Note: Later appeared on Pablo Honey (1993))	Drill	Chris Hufford (Drill); Sean Slade; Paul Q. Kolderie (Pablo Honey)	1992	
"Pulk/Pull Revolving Doors"	Amnesiac	Nigel Godrich; Radiohead	2001	
"Punchdrunk Lovesick Singalong"	My Iron Lung	John Leckie	1994	
"A Punchup at a Wedding"	Hail to the Thief	Nigel Godrich; Radiohead	2003	
"Pyramid Song"	Amnesiac	Nigel Godrich; Radiohead	2001	
"Reckoner"	In Rainbows	Nigel Godrich	2007	
"A Reminder"	B-side to "Paranoid Android" (CD2)	Nigel Godrich; Radiohead	1997	
"Ripcord"	Pablo Honey	Sean Slade; Paul Q. Kolderie	1993	
"Sail to the Moon"	Hail to the Thief	Nigel Godrich; Radiohead	2003	
"Scatterbrain"	Hail to the Thief	Nigel Godrich; Radiohead	2003	
"Separator"	The King of Limbs	Nigel Godrich	2011	
"Sit Down. Stand Up"	Hail to the Thief	Nigel Godrich; Radiohead	2003	
"Spectre"	Non-album single	Nigel Godrich	2015	
"Staircase"	The King of Limbs: Live from the Basement	Nigel Godrich; Radiohead	2011	
"Stop Whispering"	Pablo Honey	Sean Slade; Paul Q. Kolderie	1993	
"Street Spirit (Fade Out)"	The Bends	John Leckie	1995	
"Stupid Car"	Drill	Chris Hufford	1992	
"Subterranean Homesick Alien"	OK Computer	Nigel Godrich; Radiohead	1997	
"Sulk"	The Bends	John Leckie	1995	
"Supercollider"	Non-album single	Nigel Godrich; Radiohead	2011	
"Talk Show Host"	B-side to "Street Spirit (Fade Out)" (CD1)	John Leckie	1996	
"There, There"	Hail to the Thief	Nigel Godrich; Radiohead	2003	
"These Are My Twisted Words"	Non-album single	Nigel Godrich	2009	
"Thinking About You"	Drill	Chris Hufford (Drill); Sean Slade; Paul Q. Kolderie (Pablo Honey)	1992	
"Tinker Tailor Soldier Sailor Rich Man Poor Man Beggar Man Thief"	A Moon Shaped Pool	Nigel Godrich	2016	
"The Tourist"	OK Computer	Nigel Godrich; Radiohead	1997	
"Trans-Atlantic Drawl"	B-side to "Pyramid Song" (CD1)	Nigel Godrich; Radiohead	2001	
"Treefingers"	Kid A	Nigel Godrich; Radiohead	2000	
"The Trickster"	My Iron Lung	John Leckie	1994	
"True Love Waits" (Note: A studio recording was later released on A Moon Shaped Pool (2016)) (live)	I Might Be Wrong: Live Recordings	Nigel Godrich (A Moon Shaped Pool)	2001	
"Up on the Ladder"	In Rainbows Disk 2	Nigel Godrich	2007	
"Vegetable"	Pablo Honey	Sean Slade; Paul Q. Kolderie	1993	
"Videotape"	In Rainbows	Nigel Godrich	2007	
"We Suck Young Blood"	Hail to the Thief	Nigel Godrich; Radiohead	2003	
"Weird Fishes / Arpeggi"	In Rainbows	Nigel Godrich	2007	
"Where Bluebirds Fly"	B-side to "There There"	Radiohead	2003	
"Where I End and You Begin"	Hail to the Thief	Nigel Godrich; Radiohead	2003	
"A Wolf at the Door"	Hail to the Thief	Nigel Godrich; Radiohead	2003	
"Worrywort"	B-side to "Knives Out" (CD2)	Nigel Godrich; Radiohead	2001	
"Yes I Am"	B-side to "Creep" (re-release)	Radiohead	1993	
"You"	Drill	Chris Hufford (Drill); Sean Slade; Paul Q. Kolderie (Pablo Honey)	1992	
"You and Whose Army?"	Amnesiac	Nigel Godrich; Radiohead	2001	
"You Never Wash Up After Yourself" (live)	My Iron Lung	Jim Warren	1994	

== Unreleased songs ==
Radiohead have written numerous songs that have not been officially released. Live performances of many of the songs circulate as bootlegs. Asked in 2013 about the status of the unreleased songs, Radiohead's producer, Nigel Godrich, said it would all "surface one day". He cited "Nude" as an example of a song that took years to complete.

Song	Notes
"Come to Your Senses"	Radiohead played "Come to Your Senses" in 2006 at a soundcheck at the Hearst Greek Theatre in Berkeley, California. A minute-long bootleg circulated before a full bootleg appeared in June 2018. According to Consequence of Sound, the song "sounds like nothing else Radiohead has ever written", with country and folk elements.
"Cut a Hole"	Radiohead debuted "Cut a Hole" on the King of Limbs tour in 2012. It builds gradually to a climax, with "menacing" lyrics about a "long-distance connection". NME described it as "an atmospheric, shifting gloomathon" with a "head-flung-back vocal from Thom, climaxing with some of his highest notes since OK Computer".
"I Froze Up"	Yorke debuted "I Froze Up" on Rhodes piano during a webcast performance in 2002. In 2010, he performed it at a solo concert in Cambridge, England, and two months later in Chicago while touring with his band Atoms for Peace. Rolling Stone described it as "sparse" and "haunting".
"I Lie Awake"	Played in soundchecks during Radiohead's 2006 tour.
"Riding a Bullet"	Played in soundchecks during the 2008 In Rainbows tour.
"Slave"	Yorke mentioned "Slave" in a 2008 interview, and said he would send it to Godrich for mixing that night.
"Wake Me"	Played in soundchecks during the 2008 In Rainbows tour.

== See also ==
- Radiohead discography
- MiniDiscs [Hacked]

== Bibliography ==
- Footman, Tim (2007). Welcome to the Machine: OK Computer and the Death of the Classic Album. New Malden: Chrome Dreams. ISBN 978-1-84240-388-4.
