= Radiohead discography =

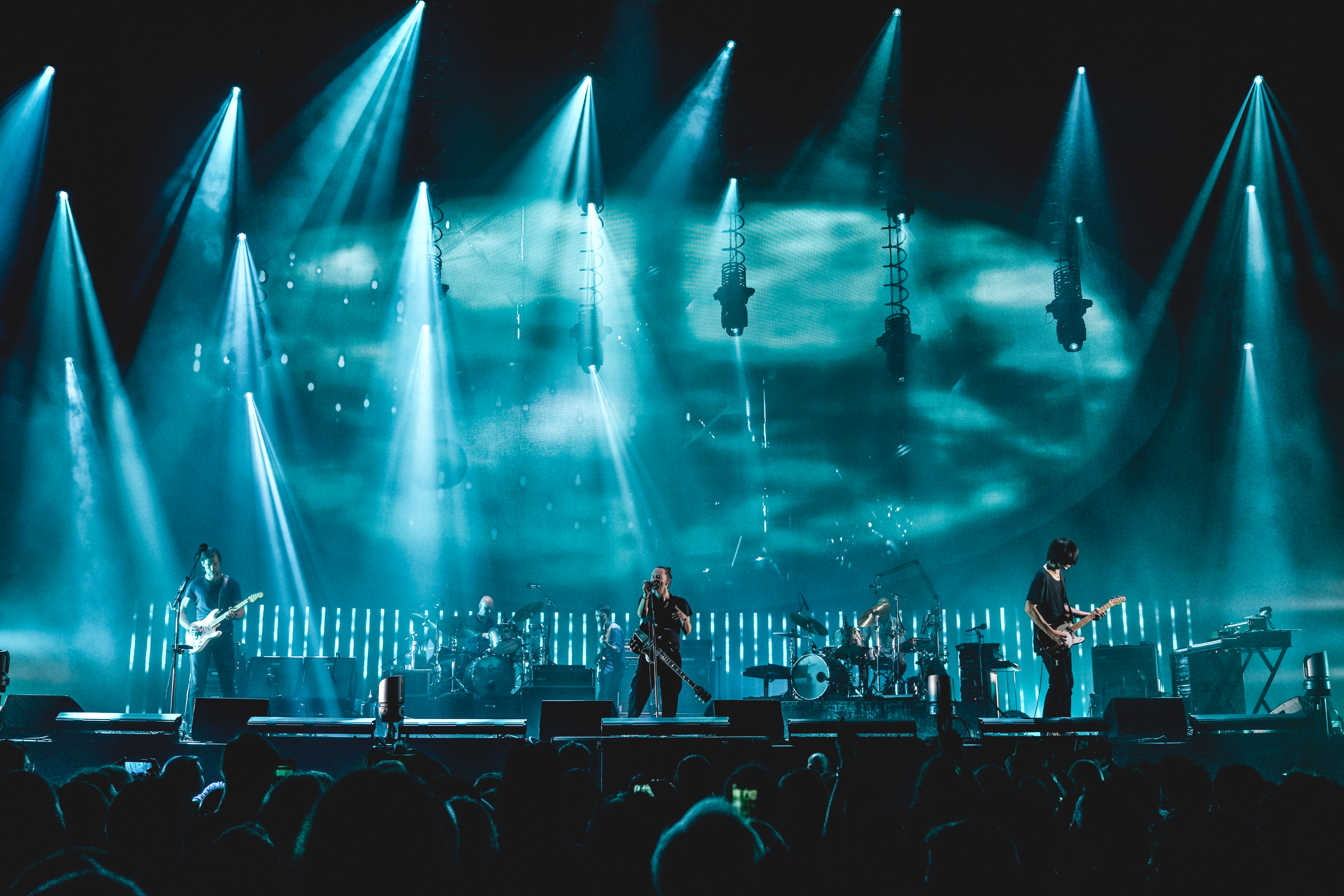
- Radiohead performing at TD Garden, Boston, in 2018
- Studio albums: 9
- Extended plays: 7
- Live albums: 2
- Compilation albums: 5
- Singles: 32
- Video albums: 9
- Music videos: 48
- Remix albums: 1
- Demo albums: 6

The English rock band Radiohead have released nine studio albums, two live albums, five compilation albums, one remix album, nine video albums, seven EPs, 32 singles and 48 music videos. Their debut album, Pablo Honey, released in February 1993, reached number 22 in the UK, and was certified platinum in the UK and US. Their debut single, "Creep", remains their most successful, entering the top 10 in several countries. Their second album, The Bends, released in March 1995, reached number four in the UK and is certified triple platinum.

Radiohead's third album, OK Computer, was released in May 1997. It remains their most successful album, reaching number one in the UK and Ireland and the top 10 in several other countries. It was certified triple platinum and produced the UK top-ten singles "Paranoid Android", "Karma Police" and "No Surprises". Kid A followed in October 2000, topping the charts in the UK and becoming the first number-one Radiohead album on the US Billboard 200. Amnesiac was released in May 2001, topping the UK charts and producing the singles "Pyramid Song" and "Knives Out". Hail to the Thief was released in June 2003, ending Radiohead's contract with EMI. It was Radiohead's fourth consecutive UK number-one album and was certified platinum.

Radiohead released their seventh album, In Rainbows, in October 2007 as a download for which customers could set their own price; a conventional retail release followed. It sold more than three million copies in one year. "Nude" and "Jigsaw Falling Into Place" were released as singles; "Nude" was Radiohead's first top-40 hit on the US Billboard Hot 100 since "Creep". Radiohead released their eighth album, The King of Limbs, in February 2011. It ended their streak of number-one albums in the UK, reaching number seven, and is the only Radiohead album not to be certified gold in the US. In April 2016, following the purchase of EMI by Universal Music, Radiohead's back catalogue transferred to XL Recordings, who had released the retail editions of In Rainbows and The King of Limbs. Radiohead released their ninth album, A Moon Shaped Pool, in May 2016, backed by the singles "Burn the Witch" and "Daydreaming".

In June 2017, Radiohead released a 20th-anniversary OK Computer reissue, OK Computer OKNOTOK 1997 2017, including unreleased tracks, two of which were released as download singles: "I Promise" and "Man of War". In June 2019, several hours of recordings from the OK Computer period leaked online; in response, Radiohead made them available "to purchase online as MiniDiscs [Hacked], with all proceeds to the environmentalist group Extinction Rebellion". Kid A Mnesia, an anniversary reissue compiling Kid A, Amnesiac and previously unreleased material, was released in November 2021, promoted with the singles "If You Say the Word" and "Follow Me Around". The live album Hail to the Thief (Live Recordings 2003–2009) was released in August 2025.

== Albums ==
=== Studio albums ===
List of studio albums, with selected chart positions and certifications
Title	Album details	Peak chart positions										Sales	Certifications
Title	Album details	UK	AUS	BEL	CAN	FRA	GER	IRL	ITA	NLD	US	Sales	Certifications
Pablo Honey	Released: 22 February 1993; Label: EMI (UK); Formats: CD, CS, LP	22	86	28	42	108	—	12	—	61	32	US: 1,520,000	BPI: 2× platinum; ARIA: gold; BRMA: platinum; FIMI: gold; MC: 2× platinum; NVPI: gold; RIAA: platinum; RMNZ: platinum
The Bends	Released: 8 March 1995; Label: EMI (UK); Formats: CD, CS, LP, MD	4	23	8	14	35	73	4	88	20	88	UK: 1,248,350; US: 1,540,000	BPI: 4× platinum; BRMA: gold; FIMI: platinum; MC: 3× platinum; NVPI: gold; RIAA: platinum
OK Computer	Released: 21 May 1997; Label: EMI (UK); Formats: CD, CS, LP, MD; Remastered release: 23 June 2017	1	7	1	2	3	13	1	6	2	21	UK: 1,579,415; US: 2,560,000	BPI: 5× platinum; ARIA: platinum; BRMA: 2× platinum; FIMI: 2× platinum; MC: 5× platinum; NVPI: platinum; RIAA: 2× platinum; RMNZ: 2× platinum; SNEP: 2× gold
Kid A	Released: 2 October 2000; Label: EMI (UK); Formats: CD, CS, LP, MD	1	2	3	1	1	4	1	3	4	1	UK: 479,000; US: 1,480,000	BPI: platinum; ARIA: platinum; FIMI: gold; MC: 2× platinum; RIAA: platinum; RMNZ: gold; SNEP: platinum
Amnesiac	Released: 30 May 2001; Label: EMI (UK); Formats: CD, CS, LP	1	2	3	1	2	2	1	2	3	2	UK: 331,000; US: 500,000	BPI: platinum; ARIA: gold; BRMA: gold; MC: platinum; RIAA: gold; SNEP: gold
Hail to the Thief	Released: 9 June 2003; Label: EMI (UK); Formats: CD, CS, LP	1	2	1	1	1	3	1	3	4	3	US: 1,120,000	BPI: platinum; ARIA: gold; BRMA: gold; MC: platinum; RIAA: gold; SNEP: gold
In Rainbows	Released: 10 October 2007; Label: Xurbia Xendless, XL (WW); Formats: CD, LP, DL	1	2	2	1	1	8	1	7	7	1	US: 1,020,000	BPI: platinum; BRMA: gold; FIMI: gold; MC: platinum; RIAA: gold; RMNZ: platinum
The King of Limbs	Released: 18 February 2011; Label: Ticker Tape, XL (WW); Formats: CD, LP, DL	7	2	7	5	8	13	7	8	3	3	US: 370,000	BPI: gold; MC: gold
A Moon Shaped Pool	Released: 8 May 2016; Label: XL (WW); Formats: CD, LP, DL	1	2	2	2	5	3	1	2	2	3	CAN: 33,000; US: 173,000	BPI: platinum; ARIA: gold; FIMI: gold; MC: platinum; RIAA: gold; RMNZ: gold; SNEP: gold
"—" denotes a recording that did not chart or was not released in that territory.

=== Live albums ===
List of live albums, with selected chart positions and certifications
Title	Album details	Peak chart positions					
Title	Album details	UK	AUS	BEL	IRL	NLD	US
Hail to the Thief (Live Recordings 2003–2009)	Released: 13 August 2025; Label: XL; Formats: CD, LP, DL	12	15	9	29	15	200

=== Compilation albums ===
List of compilation albums, with selected chart positions and certifications
Title	Album details	Peak chart positions										Certifications
Title	Album details	UK	AUS	BEL	CAN	FRA	GER	IRL	ITA	NLD	US	Certifications
Radiohead Box Set	Released: 10 December 2007 (UK); Label: EMI; Formats: CD, DL, USB	—	—	—	95	162	—	—	—	—	—	
Radiohead: The Best Of	Released: 2 June 2008 (UK); Label: Parlophone; Formats: CD, LP, DL	4	10	1	10	39	38	1	7	9	26	BPI: platinum; BRMA: gold; FIMI: platinum; IRMA: platinum; SNEP: gold
OK Computer OKNOTOK 1997 2017	Released: 23 June 2017 (UK); Label: XL; Formats: CD, LP, DL	2	6	6	10	12	13	2	11	5	23	BPI: gold
MiniDiscs [Hacked]	Released: 11 June 2019; Label: Self-released; Formats: DL	—	—	—	—	—	—	—	—	—	—	
Kid A Mnesia	Released: 5 November 2021; Label: XL; Formats: CD, CS, LP, DL	4	3	9	34	42	7	3	29	6	12	
"—" denotes a recording that did not chart or was not released in that territory.

=== Remix albums ===
List of remix albums, with selected chart positions
Title	Album details	Peak chart positions									
Title	Album details	UK	BEL	FRA	IRL	ITA	JPN	NLD	SCO	SWI	US
TKOL RMX 1234567	Released: 16 September 2011 (JPN); Label: Ticker Tape, XL; Formats: CD, DL	34	43	79	48	63	48	74	35	95	50

=== Demo albums ===
- "On a Friday" (1986) (as On a Friday) (recorded in Abingdon School music room)
- Medicinal Sounds (1987) (as On a Friday) (recorded in Sphincter Studios in Marcham)
- "Gripe" (1988) (as On a Friday) (recorded in Woodworm Studios)
- "The Greatest Shindig" (1990) (as Shindig) (recorded in Clifton Hampden Village Hall, Nuneham Courtenay Village Hall, and on home 4-track)
- Untitled (nicknamed "Dungeon Demo") (1991) (as On a Friday) (recorded in Dungeon Studios)
- First Tapes (aka Manic Hedgehog) (1991) (as On a Friday) (recorded in Courtyard Studios)

=== Video albums ===
List of video albums, with selected chart positions and certifications
Title	Album details	Peak chart positions			Certifications
Title	Album details	UK Video	JPN	US Video	Certifications
Live at the Astoria	Released: 13 March 1995 (UK); Label: Parlophone, EMI; Formats: VHS, DVD	—	161	9	BPI: gold
7 Television Commercials	Released: 4 May 1998 (UK); Label: Parlophone, EMI; Formats: VHS, DVD	—	—	14	BPI: platinum; RIAA: gold
Meeting People Is Easy	Released: 30 November 1998 (UK); Label: Parlophone, EMI; Formats: DVD, VHS	—	—	2	BPI: gold; RIAA: platinum
The Most Gigantic Lying Mouth of All Time	Released: 1 December 2004 (UK); Label: W.A.S.T.E.; Formats: DVD	—	—	—	
Radiohead: The Best Of	Released: 23 June 2008 (UK); Label: Parlophone; Formats: DVD	—	20	—	
In Rainbows – From the Basement	Released: 24 June 2008 (UK); Label: Xurbia Xendless; Formats: DL	—	—	—	
The King of Limbs: Live from the Basement	Released: 19 December 2011 (UK); Label: Ticker Tape, XL; Formats: BD, DVD, DL	10	74	—	
"—" denotes a recording that did not chart or was not released in that territory.

== EPs ==
List of EPs, with selected chart positions and certifications
Title	EP details	Peak chart positions										Certifications
Title	EP details	UK	AUT	BEL	FRA	IRL	JPN	NLD	NOR	SCO	US	Certifications
Drill	Released: 5 May 1992 (UK); Label: Parlophone; Formats: CD, CS, 12"	101	—	—	—	—	—	—	—	—	—	
Itch	Released: 1 June 1994 (JPN); Label: EMI; Formats: CD	—	—	—	—	—	—	—	—	—	—	
My Iron Lung	Released: 26 September 1994 (UK); Label: EMI; Formats: CD, 12"	24	—	—	—	39	209	—	—	97	—	BPI: gold; ARIA: platinum
No Surprises / Running from Demons	Released: 10 December 1997 (JPN); Label: Parlophone; Formats: CD	—	—	—	—	—	—	—	—	—	—	
Airbag / How Am I Driving?	Released: 21 April 1998 (UK); Label: EMI; Formats: CD	—	—	91	159	15	—	—	—	14	56	BPI: silver
I Might Be Wrong: Live Recordings	Released: 12 November 2001 (UK); Label: EMI; Formats: CD, CS, LP	23	30	38	14	76	22	23	94	19	44	BPI: silver
COM LAG (2plus2isfive)	Released: 24 March 2004 (JPN); Label: EMI; Formats: CD	37	75	45	59	66	25	62	19	39	—	
In Rainbows Disk 2	Released: 3 December 2007; Label: XL (WW); Formats: CD	—	—	—	—	—	—	—	—	—	—	
"—" denotes a recording that did not chart or was not released in that territory.

== Singles ==
List of singles, with selected chart positions and certifications, showing year released and album name
Title	Year	Peak chart positions										Certifications	Album
Title	Year	UK	AUS	BEL (WA)	CAN	FRA	IRL	ITA	NLD	NZ	US	Certifications	Album
"Creep"	1992	7	6	8	30	4	13	58	13	19	34	BPI: 5× platinum; ARIA: gold; MC: 7× platinum; FIMI: 3× platinum; RMNZ: 6× platinum	Pablo Honey
"Anyone Can Play Guitar"	1993	32	97	—	—	—	—	—	—	—	—		Pablo Honey
"Pop Is Dead" (Note: "Pop Is Dead" is included in the 2009 Collector's Edition of Pablo Honey.)	1993	42	—	—	—	—	—	—	—	—	—		Non-album single
"Stop Whispering"	1993	—	131	—	—	—	—	—	—	—	—		Pablo Honey
"My Iron Lung"	1994	24	100	—	5	—	—	—	—	—	—		The Bends
"High and Dry" / "Planet Telex"	1995	17	62	—	31	—	40	—	—	22	78	BPI: platinum; MC: 2× platinum; FIMI: gold; RMNZ: 2× platinum	The Bends
"Fake Plastic Trees"	1995	20	132	—	62	—	—	—	—	22	— (Note: "Fake Plastic Trees" did not enter the Billboard Hot 100, but peaked at number 65 on the Hot 100 Airplay chart.)	BPI: gold; MC: platinum; RMNZ: platinum	The Bends
"Just"	1995	19	127	—	—	—	—	—	—	—	— (Note: "Just" did not enter the Billboard Hot 100, but peaked at number 32 on the Hot Singles Sales chart.)	BPI: gold; MC: gold; RMNZ: gold	The Bends
"Street Spirit (Fade Out)"	1996	5	114	— (Note: "Street Spirit (Fade Out)" did not enter the Ultratop chart, but peaked at number three on the Ultratop Back Catalogue Singles chart.)	57	—	25	—	26	—	— (Note: "Street Spirit (Fade Out)" did not enter the Billboard Hot 100, but peaked at number 24 on the Hot Singles Sales chart.)	BPI: silver; RMNZ: gold	The Bends
"The Bends" (Note: "The Bends" was released only in Ireland.)	1996	—	—	—	—	—	26	—	—	—	—		The Bends
"Paranoid Android"	1997	3	29	—	—	—	4	11	61	—	— (Note: "Paranoid Android" did not enter the Billboard Hot 100, but peaked at number 20 on the Hot Singles Sales chart.)	BPI: platinum; MC: gold; RMNZ: gold	OK Computer
"Karma Police"	1997	8	71	35	59	153	15	16	50	32	— (Note: "Karma Police" did not enter the Billboard Hot 100, but peaked at number 69 on the Hot 100 Airplay chart.)	BPI: platinum; MC: platinum; FIMI: platinum; RMNZ: 2× platinum	OK Computer
"Lucky" (Note: "Lucky" was released only in France.)	1997	—	—	—	—	—	—	—	—	—	—		OK Computer
"No Surprises"	1998	4	47	—	—	31	13	—	58	23	— (Note: "No Surprises" did not enter the Billboard Hot 100, but peaked at number 27 on the Hot Singles Sales chart.)	BPI: 2× platinum; MC: gold; FIMI: platinum; RMNZ: 2× platinum	OK Computer
"Pyramid Song"	2001	5	25	— (Note: "Pyramid Song" did not enter the Wallonie Ultratop chart, but peaked at number 12 on the Ultratip chart.)	2	19	10	6	23	—	— (Note: "Pyramid Song" did not enter the Billboard Hot 100, but peaked at number 26 on the Hot Singles Sales chart.)	BPI: silver	Amnesiac
"Knives Out"	2001	13	56	—	1	46	25	17	63	—	— (Note: "Knives Out" did not enter the Billboard Hot 100, but peaked at number 20 on the Hot Singles Sales chart.)		Amnesiac
"There There"	2003	4	28	39	1	54	7	5	48	—	—		Hail to the Thief
"Go to Sleep"	2003	12	39	— (Note: "Go to Sleep" did not enter the Wallonie Ultratop chart, but peaked at number 10 on the Ultratip chart.)	2	87	11	9	55	—	— (Note: "Go to Sleep" did not enter the Billboard Hot 100, but peaked at number 8 on the Hot Singles Sales chart.)		Hail to the Thief
"2 + 2 = 5"	2003	15	54	—	2	64	36	12	99	—	— (Note: "2 + 2 = 5" did not enter the Billboard Hot 100, but peaked at number 22 on the Hot Singles Sales chart.)		Hail to the Thief
"Jigsaw Falling into Place"	2008	30	—	— (Note: "Jigsaw Falling into Place" did not enter the Wallonie Ultratop chart, but peaked at number 13 on the Ultratip chart.)	—	55	32	—	—	—	—	BPI: gold; RMNZ: platinum	In Rainbows
"Nude"	2008	21	—	16	8	76	18	2	8	23	37	BPI: silver; MC: gold; RMNZ: gold	In Rainbows
"Harry Patch (In Memory Of)"	2009	—	—	—	—	—	—	—	—	—	—		Non-album singles
"These Are My Twisted Words"	2009	—	—	—	—	—	—	—	—	—	—		Non-album singles
"Supercollider" / "The Butcher" (Note: "Supercollider" / "The Butcher" was released as a limited edition single for Record Store Day in 2011.)	2011	— (Note: "Supercollider" / "The Butcher" did not enter the UK Singles Chart, but peaked at number 2 on the UK Physical Singles Chart.)	—	—	—	—	—	—	—	—	— (Note: "Supercollider" did not enter the Billboard Hot 100, but peaked at number 5 on the Hot Singles Sales chart.)		Non-album singles
"The Daily Mail" / "Staircase"	2011	71	—	—	—	—	—	—	—	—	— (Note: "The Daily Mail" did not enter the Billboard Hot 100, but peaked at number 2 on the Hot Singles Sales chart.)		The King of Limbs: Live from the Basement
"Spectre" (Note: "Spectre" is also included in the Special Edition of A Moon Shaped Pool.)	2015	—	—	—	—	—	—	—	—	—	—		Non-album single
"Burn the Witch"	2016	64	63	— (Note: "Burn The Witch" did not enter the Wallonie Ultratop chart, but peaked at number 18 on the Ultratip chart.)	83	51	51	74	— (Note: "Burn the Witch" did not enter the Netherlands' Single Top 100 but peaked on the Netherlands' Single Tip Chart at number 9.)	—	— (Note: "Burn the Witch" did not enter the Billboard Hot 100, but peaked at number 21 on the Bubbling Under Hot 100 Singles chart, which acts as a 25-song extension to the Hot 100.)	MC: gold	A Moon Shaped Pool
"Daydreaming"	2016	74	73	— (Note: "Daydreaming" did not enter the Wallonie Ultratop chart, but peaked at number 46 on the Ultratip chart.)	—	28	84	88	—	—	—		A Moon Shaped Pool
"I Promise"	2017	— (Note: "I Promise" did not enter the UK Singles Chart, but peaked at number 83 on the UK Singles Downloads Chart.)	—	—	—	136	—	—	—	—	—		OK Computer OKNOTOK 1997 2017
"Man of War"	2017	—	—	— (Note: "Man of War" did not enter the Wallonie Ultratop chart, but charted as an "extra tip" on the Ultratip chart.)	—	178	—	—	—	—	—		OK Computer OKNOTOK 1997 2017
"If You Say the Word"	2021	—	—	—	—	—	—	—	—	—	—		Kid A Mnesia
"Follow Me Around"	2021	—	—	—	—	—	—	—	—	—	—		Kid A Mnesia
"—" denotes a recording that did not chart or was not released in that territory.

=== Promotional singles ===
Title	Year	Peak chart positions										Certifications	Album
Title	Year	UK	CAN	FRA	IRL	ITA	JPN	LTU	POL	US	WW	Certifications	Album
"Let Down"	1997	73	71	—	73	—	—	95	—	91	99	BPI: silver; RMNZ: platinum	OK Computer
"Airbag"	1998	—	—	—	—	—	—	—	—	—	—		OK Computer
"How to Disappear Completely"	2000	—	—	—	—	—	—	—	—	—	—	BPI: silver	Kid A
"Idioteque"	2000	—	—	—	—	—	—	—	—	—	—		Kid A
"The National Anthem"	2000	—	—	—	—	—	—	—	—	—	—		Kid A
"Optimistic"	2000	—	—	—	—	—	—	—	23	—	—		Kid A
"I Might Be Wrong"	2001	—	—	—	—	—	—	—	—	—	—		Amnesiac
"I Want None of This"	2005	— (Note: "I Want None of This" did not enter the UK Singles Chart, but peaked at number 19 on the UK Singles Downloads Chart.)	—	—	—	—	—	—	—	—	—		Help!: A Day in the Life
"House of Cards"	2008	—	—	—	—	—	—	—	6	—	—	MC: gold	In Rainbows
"Bodysnatchers"	2008	—	—	—	—	—	34	—	—	—	—		In Rainbows
"Reckoner"	2008	74	—	127	—	—	—	—	21	— (Note: "Reckoner" did not enter the Billboard Hot 100, but peaked at number 21 on the Bubbling Under Hot 100 Singles chart, which acts as a 25-song extension to the Hot 100.)	—	BPI: silver; MC: gold	In Rainbows
"All I Need"	2009	—	—	—	—	—	—	—	—	—	—	BPI: gold; MC: gold	In Rainbows
"Lotus Flower"	2011	165	—	—	—	91	52	—	19	—	—		The King of Limbs
"Present Tense"	2016	—	—	—	—	—	—	—	—	—	—		A Moon Shaped Pool
"Identikit"	2016	—	—	—	—	—	—	—	—	—	—		A Moon Shaped Pool
"Ill Wind"	2019	— (Note: "Ill Wind" did not enter the UK Singles Chart, but peaked at number 50 on the UK Singles Sales Chart.)	—	40	—	—	—	—	21	—	—		A Moon Shaped Pool
"—" denotes a recording that did not chart or was not released in that territory.

== Other charted and certified songs ==
Title	Year	Peak chart positions						Certifications	Album
Title	Year	UK Sales	UK Indie	FRA	US Sales	US Dance	US Rock	Certifications	Album
"Exit Music (For a Film)"	1997	―	―	―	―	―	―	BPI: silver; RMNZ: gold	OK Computer
"Everything in Its Right Place"	2000	―	―	―	―	―	―	BPI: gold; MC: gold	Kid A
"15 Step"	2007	―	―	―	―	―	―	MC: gold	In Rainbows
"Weird Fishes / Arpeggi"	2007	―	―	―	―	―	―	BPI: gold; RMNZ: gold	In Rainbows
"Codex"	2011	―	39	―	―	―	―		The King of Limbs
"Bloom"	2011	6	―	―	16	7	―		TKOL RMX 1234567
"Morning Mr. Magpie"	2011	4	―	―	15	3	―		TKOL RMX 1234567
"Little by Little"	2011	3	―	―	8	2	―		TKOL RMX 1234567
"Feral"	2011	6	―	―	23	6	―		TKOL RMX 1234567
"Give Up the Ghost"	2011	7	―	―	14	4	―		TKOL RMX 1234567
"Good Evening Mrs. Magpie"	2011	7	―	―	15	5	―		TKOL RMX 1234567
"True Love Waits"	2016	―	―	181	―	―	43		A Moon Shaped Pool
"—" denotes a recording that did not chart or was not released in that territory.

== Music videos ==
Title	Year	Director(s)
"Creep"	1993	Brett Turnbull
"Anyone Can Play Guitar"	1993	Dwight Clarke
"Pop Is Dead"	1993	Dwight Clarke
"Stop Whispering"	1993	Jeffrey Plansker
"My Iron Lung"	1994	Brett Turnbull
"High and Dry" (UK Version)	1995	David Mould
"Fake Plastic Trees"	1995	Jake Scott
"Just"	1995	Jamie Thraves
"Lucky"	1995	—N/a
"High and Dry" (US Version)	1996	Paul Cunningham
"Street Spirit (Fade Out)"	1996	Jonathan Glazer
"Paranoid Android"	1997	Magnus Carlsson
"Let Down" (Note: The music video for "Let Down" was completed, but later shelved by Radiohead due to their dissatisfaction with it.)	1997	Simon Hilton
"Karma Police"	1997	Jonathan Glazer
"Fitter Happier" (Note: The music video for "Fitter Happier" was completed and sent to EMI, but was shelved for unknown reasons.)	1997	James Engwell
"No Surprises"	1998	Grant Gee
"Palo Alto"	1999	Grant Gee
Kid A promotional blips	2000	Chris Bran, Shynola, Stanley Donwood
"Idioteque" (version 1; "Blinking Bear" version)	2000	Chris Bran
"Idioteque" (version 2)	2000	Grant Gee
"Motion Picture Soundtrack"	2001	Stanley Donwood, Shynola
"The National Anthem" (MTV Latin America contest)	2001	Juan Ferreyra
"Pyramid Song"	2001	Shynola
"Knives Out"	2001	Michel Gondry
"I Might Be Wrong" (version 1)	2001	Chris Bran
"I Might Be Wrong" (version 2)	2001	Sophie Muller
"Push Pulk/Spinning Plates" (Note: A continuous music video featuring both "Pulk/Pull Revolving Doors" and "Like Spinning Plates" serves as the video for both tracks.)	2001	Johnny Hardstaff
"How to Disappear Completely" (live)	2001	—N/a
"There There"	2003	Chris Hopewell
"Go to Sleep"	2003	Alex Rutterford
"Sit Down, Stand Up"	2003	Ed Holdsworth
"2 + 2 = 5" (live)	2003	Fabien Raymond
"Jigsaw Falling into Place"	2007	Adam Buxton and Garth Jennings (Co-directed "Jigsaw Falling into Place")
"Nude"	2008	Adam Buxton and Garth Jennings (Co-directed "Jigsaw Falling into Place")
"All I Need"	2008	John Seale, Steve Rogers
"House of Cards"	2008	James Frost
"Reckoner"	2008	Clement Picon
"Weird Fishes/Arpeggi"	2008	Tobias Stretch
"Videotape"	2008	Wolfgang Jaiser, Claus Winter
"15 Step"	2008	Kota Totori
"Lotus Flower"	2011	Garth Jennings
"Burn the Witch"	2016	Chris Hopewell
"Daydreaming"	2016	Paul Thomas Anderson
A Moon Shaped Pool vignettes	2016	Various (Richard Ayoade, Ben Wheatley, Yorgos Lanthimos, etc.)
"Present Tense"	2016	Paul Thomas Anderson
"The Numbers"	2016	Paul Thomas Anderson
"I Promise"	2017	Michal Marczak
"Man of War"	2017	Colin Read
"Lift"	2017	Oscar Hudson
"If You Say the Word"	2021	Kasper Häggström
"Follow Me Around"	2021	Us (Chris Barrett, Luke Taylor)

== See also ==
- List of songs recorded by Radiohead
