= The Itch =

The Itch may refer to:

- The Itch (House)

== Music ==
- "The Itch", song and single by Kix Kix (album) 1981
- The Itch (Vitamin C song) 2001
- "The Itch", by Keb' Mo' from Suitcase (Keb' Mo' album) 2006
- "The Itch" song by saxophonist Chuck Higgins
- "The Itch", band from Stillwater, Minnesota circa 1991

== Television ==
- "The Itch", an episode of season 1 of Tom and Jerry Tales

== See also ==
- Itch (disambiguation)
