= Ich =

Ich, ich or ICH may refer to:

== Places ==
- Ich, Semnan, a village in Semnan Province, Iran
- Ich, Zanjan, a village in Zanjan Province, Iran
- Ich, alternative name of Ij, Zanjan, a village in Zanjan Province, Iran

== Medicine ==
- The ego (German: Ich), one of the psychic apparatus defined in Sigmund Freud's structural model of the psyche
- Infectious canine hepatitis, an acute liver infection in dogs
- Ichthyophthirius multifiliis, often shortened to ich, a disease of freshwater fish
  - Cryptocaryon or marine ich, a similar disease of marine fish
- Intracranial hemorrhage, bleeding within the skull
  - Intracerebral hemorrhage, bleeding into brain tissues and/or brain vessicles
- International Council for Harmonisation of Technical Requirements for Pharmaceuticals for Human Use
- UCL Institute of Child Health, University College London, UK

== Science and technology ==
- Intangible cultural heritage, a concept in cultural anthropology

=== Technology ===
- I/O Controller Hub, an Intel Southbridge technology
- Intelligent Corruption Handling, a corruption-handling method used in eMule

== Other ==
- Ich, a German pronoun meaning I, also a Middle English form of I
- Ich (album), a 2006 album by German rapper Sido
- Indian Coffee House, a restaurant chain in India
- Interagency Council on Homelessness, United States

== See also ==
- ICK (disambiguation)
- Itch (disambiguation)
