= Ickx =

Ickx is a surname. Notable people with the name include:

- Jacky Ickx (born 1945), Belgian racing driver
  - Pascal Ickx (born 1937), Belgian racing driver and brother of Jacky
  - Vanina Ickx (born 1975), Belgian racing driver and daughter of Jacky
- Johan Ickx (born 1962), archivist of Vatican City

== See also ==
- ICK (disambiguation)
