= Lift (Radiohead song) =

2017 song

Promotional single by Radiohead

from the album OK Computer OKNOTOK 1997 2017
- Released: 23 June 2017
- Recorded: February 1996
- Studio: Chipping Norton Studios
- Genre: Britpop
- Length: 4:07
- Label: XL
- Songwriters: Colin Greenwood; Jonny Greenwood; Ed O'Brien; Philip Selway; Thom Yorke
- Producers: Nigel Godrich; Radiohead

Music video
- "Lift" on YouTube

"Lift" is a song by the English rock band Radiohead, released on the 2017 compilation album OKNOTOK 1997 2017. Critics described it as an anthemic Britpop-like guitar ballad.

Radiohead first performed "Lift" in 1996. Bootleg recordings were widely circulated, and it became a fan favourite. Radiohead recorded versions of "Lift" during the sessions for their third album, OK Computer (1997), planning to release it as the first single, but abandoned it. They felt pressured by its commercial potential and felt it did not represent what they wanted to say at the time. After OK Computer, Radiohead moved further from conventional rock music. In 2002, they performed "Lift" in a different arrangement, but dismissed it as inferior.

In 2017, Radiohead released a version of "Lift" recorded during the OK Computer sessions on OKNOTOK 1997 2017, followed by a music video. It received positive reviews, though some critics found it inferior to the bootlegged performances. Further versions recorded during the OK Computer period were released on the 2019 compilation MiniDiscs [Hacked] and received more positive reviews.

== History ==
Radiohead first performed "Lift" on March 14, 1996, at the Troubadour in West Hollywood. They performed it more than 30 times that year while supporting Alanis Morissette on her Jagged Little Pill tour. According to the guitarist Ed O'Brien, the audience responded warmly: "Suddenly you'd see them get up and start grooving. It had this kind of infectiousness." Journalists noted "Lift" as a highlight and possible future single. A bootleg recording was widely circulated and "Lift" became a fan favourite.

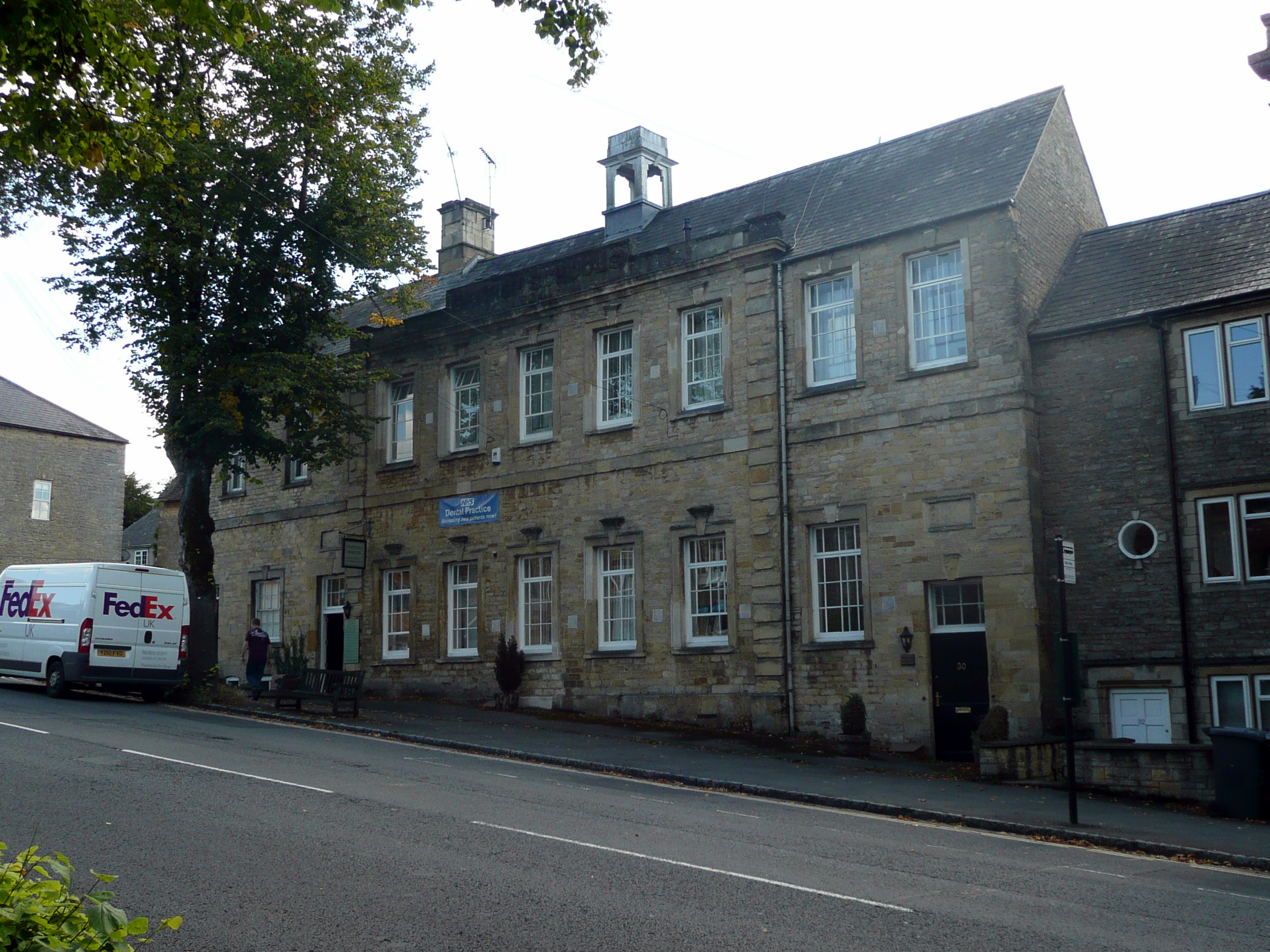
The former Chipping Norton Recording Studios, Oxfordshire, where Radiohead recorded "Lift" in 1996

According to Radiohead's producer, Nigel Godrich, "Lift" was initially planned as the first single from Radiohead's third album, OK Computer. Radiohead recorded it during the first sessions for the album, at Chipping Norton Recording Studios in Oxfordshire, but it went unreleased. According to the drummer, Philip Selway, Radiohead came to feel "Lift" was "fey" and not "what we wanted to say about ourselves as a band at the time".

In 1999, O'Brien dismissed "Lift" as "bogshite", and said Radiohead were "very happy to leave [it] off the album ... There wasn't any stage where it was a key track for any of us." Asked why the song could have worked in live performance but not in the studio, O'Brien said Radiohead had not worked hard on it and that if a song did not come together quickly they would move on. The singer, Thom Yorke, said Radiohead had settled on playing it in "a certain way that didn't work", and that it had become impossible to rearrange. In 2017, O'Brien said that Radiohead had felt pressured by the commercial potential:

If that song had been on that album, it would have taken us to a different place, and we'd have probably sold a lot more records, if we'd done it right, and everyone was saying this. I think we kind of subconsciously killed it, because if OK Computer had been like a Jagged Little Pill, like Alanis Morrissette, it would have killed us. But "Lift" probably had the potential, if we'd done it right, it just had this magic about it. And we didn't do a good version, because when we got to the studio and did it on that record it was a bit like having a gun to your head, it felt like so much pressure.

After OK Computer, Radiohead moved further from conventional rock music. In 2017, O'Brien described "Lift" as an "epic" song similar to the 1996 Manic Street Preachers single "A Design for Life", and said that Radiohead no longer produced that kind of music. In 2002, Radiohead performed "Lift" in a slower, more restrained arrangement, which Pitchfork described as "a sombre, almost queasy affair". O'Brien and the guitarist Jonny Greenwood later dismissed this version as inferior. In 2003, O'Brien said: "The spirit of the song was there in '96 ... And we're not in that place at the moment."

Pitchfork wrote that "Lift" came to "hold an important place in Radiohead lore", and according to Rolling Stone it was for decades the "great white whale" for Radiohead fans. In 2015, Greenwood suggested that Radiohead had worked on "Lift" again, describing it as a "management favourite". He likened the situation to their 2007 song "Nude", which had been written years before release.

== Release ==
In June 2017, Radiohead released "Lift" on the OK Computer reissue OKNOTOK 1997 2017, alongside two other previously unreleased tracks: "I Promise" and "Man of War". This version "Lift" was recorded at Chipping Norton Recording Studios in February 1996, while Radiohead were recording demos for OK Computer.

According to Selway, Radiohead forgot that they had recorded this version and were pleased to hear it again. He said it reflected Radiohead's tendency to overanalyse their work: "You have it there and then you just try to pull it apart and then when you put it back together it doesn't look like a television set any more ... But it was there all along. And so it's been lovely, really lovely, coming back to that version of it. Just thinking, 'Oh OK, we weren't wrong about that one.' That had something."

In 2019, hours of recordings made during the OK Computer sessions leaked online, including more versions of "Lift". In response, Radiohead released the recordings as the compilation MiniDiscs [Hacked].

== Composition ==
Spin described "Lift" as a Britpop-like ballad. Rolling Stone described it as "one of the last vestiges of [Radiohead's] anthemic, Britpop hooks before the band embarked on a darker path with OK Computer". According to Pitchfork, the song is "strummy and steadily building, with yearning vocals".

The lyrics describe a man who has been rescued from a malfunctioning lift. Pitchfork likened its themes to the OK Computer single "No Surprises", and interpreted the lyric "Today is the first day of the rest of your days" as "a death sentence ... The hapless soul inside it is doomed to expire soundlessly in the intestines of some soulless corporate edifice."

== Music video ==
On 12 September 2017, Radiohead released a music video for "Lift" directed by Oscar Hudson, featuring Yorke taking an unusual journey in a lift. The video features cameos from Yorke's daughter and his partner Dajana Roncione, and references older Radiohead videos, with appearances from characters from the "Paranoid Android" and "Karma Police" videos. Pitchfork named it the 14th-best music video of 2017.

== Reception ==
Reviewing OKNOTOK for Record Collector, Jamie Atkins wrote that "Lift" was "an undeniably brilliant alt rock song, with surprising echoes of the grandstanding, otherworldly melancholy of prime Smashing Pumpkins". The Guardian critic Alexis Petridis said it had "an immense, air-punch-inducing chorus", and that it would have been a hit had Radiohead released it. The Pitchfork critic Jayson Greene described it as "a lovely, weightless strummer of a song".

Several critics felt the version released on OKNOTOK lacked energy. In Rolling Stone, Daniel Kreps wrote that it was "restrained, decelerated and boasting an uncharacteristically blasé Yorke vocal take" and did not match the "magnitude" of the live bootlegs. The Spin critic Andy Cush felt it was "strangely neutered, with drums that patter instead of exploding with energy", and that the widely circulated 1996 bootleg remained "canonical". Another Spin writer, Winston Cook-Wilson, agreed that the bootlegs were "a bit more staggering", but felt this was "a testament to the band's remarkable pop sense at the time – an inclination they, for their own neurotic reasons, quickly moved to complicate or subvert".

Following the 2019 release of MiniDiscs [Hacked], the Pitchfork critics Greene and Jeremy D Larson wrote that it had a superior version of "Lift". Larson wrote: "It's not mixed very carefully, but it sounds scrappy and untamed, like the band is pushing it into the red unselfconsciously. It lives up to the myth." Rolling Stone considered this version the "crown jewel" of the release and "well worth" the price of purchase. In the Guardian, Ben Beumont-Thomas wrote that this "satisfying" version would likely have pleased Radiohead's record label, EMI, had they released it as the first OK Computer single, but that it was "ultimately a conservative song and feels like a path the band were right to fork from".

== Personnel ==
Radiohead

- Colin Greenwood
- Jonny Greenwood
- Ed O'Brien
- Philip Selway
- Thom Yorke

Additional musicians

- Chris Blair – mastering
- Nigel Godrich – production, engineering
- Jim Warren – production, engineering
