= Kid A Mnesia =

Compilation album by Radiohead
- Released: 5 November 2021
- Recorded: 4 January 1999 – 18 April 2000
- Studios: Guillaume Tell, Paris; Medley, Copenhagen; Unnamed studio, Oxford, England
- Genres: Experimental rock; electronica; art rock; ambient; post-rock; alternative rock
- Length: 128:01
- Label: XL
- Producers: Nigel Godrich; Radiohead

Radiohead chronology
MiniDiscs [Hacked] (2019)	Kid A Mnesia (2021)	Hail to the Thief (Live Recordings 2003–2009) (2025)

Singles from Kid A Mnesia
- 1. "If You Say the Word" Released: 7 September 2021; 2. "Follow Me Around" Released: 1 November 2021

Kid A Mnesia is a reissue compiling the albums Kid A (2000) and Amnesiac (2001) by the English rock band Radiohead alongside previously unreleased material. It was released on 5 November 2021 on XL Recordings.

Kid A Mnesia was promoted with a campaign on the social network TikTok, followed by singles and music videos for the previously unreleased songs "If You Say the Word" and "Follow Me Around". It received positive reviews, though reaction to the bonus material was mixed. It entered the top 10 of several national album charts and topped the UK Independent Albums Chart and the US Billboard Top Alternative Albums and Top Rock Albums charts.

Kid A Mnesia Exhibition, an interactive experience with music and artwork from the albums, was released in the same month for PlayStation 5, macOS and Windows. A physical exhibition opened at the 2026 Coachella festival in California and is set to tour the US.

== Content ==
Radiohead recorded Kid A (2000) and Amnesiac (2001) simultaneously in 1999 and 2000. They originally considered releasing them as a double album, but felt the material was too dense. Kid A Mnesia compiles Kid A and Amnesiac, along with a third disc, Kid Amnesiae, comprising previously unreleased material from the Kid A and Amnesiac recording sessions. The albums are not remastered. The "deluxe" edition also contains an art book and Kid Amnesiette, a cassette edition with five B-sides.

"Like Spinning Plates ('Why Us?' Version)" is a piano arrangement of the electronic song "Like Spinning Plates". "If You Say the Word" features "delicate" fingerpicking, a "foreboding groove", "chiming" percussion and ondes Martenot. "Follow Me Around" is a solo acoustic guitar performance by Thom Yorke, with a "soaring" chorus and references to Margaret Thatcher. "Pulk/Pull (True Love Waits Version)" is a "harsh, industrial" version of another song, "True Love Waits", which Radiohead used to create the Amnesiac track "Pulk/Pull Revolving Doors". The bonus disc also includes the B-sides "Fog" and "Fast-Track", an alternative version of "Morning Bell", and the isolated strings from "How to Disappear Completely" and "Pyramid Song".

== Promotion and release ==
On 1 April 2021, Radiohead joined the social media platform TikTok and began posting short videos featuring their character Chieftain Mews. Over the course of several months, they posted more than 30 videos. In early September, Radiohead posted a comedic video in which Yorke and Radiohead's cover artist, Stanley Donwood, discussed the channel's declining engagement.

Radiohead announced Kid A Mnesia on 7 September 2021, and released a digital single, the previously unreleased track "If You Say the Word". A music video for "If You Say the Word" was released on 23 September. Directed by Kasper Häggström, it follows two men who capture people in the forest and bring them to London to become office workers. "Follow Me Around" was released on 1 November, with a music video starring Guy Pearce as a man avoiding a drone following him in his home. Radiohead released Kid A Mnesia merchandise including a bone china tea set, and Yorke and Donwood produced two art books detailing the creative process of the albums. In October 2021, Donwood and Yorke curated an exhibition of Kid A artwork at Christie's headquarters in London.

Kid A Mnesia was released in vinyl, CD, cassette and digital versions. It reached number one on the UK Independent Albums Chart, number one the American Billboard Top Alternative Albums and Top Rock Albums charts, and the top ten of several other national charts.

=== Kid A Mnesia Exhibition ===
Radiohead planned to create an art installation based on the albums, but this was canceled due to logistical problems and the COVID-19 pandemic. Instead, a digital experience, Kid A Mnesia Exhibition, was released in November as a free download for PlayStation 5, macOS and Windows. It was developed over two years by Radiohead with Namethemachine, Arbitrarily Good Productions and Epic Games. It received positive reviews for its intersection of music, art and technology. A physical version of the exhibition, Motion Picture House: Kid A Mnesia, opened at the 2026 Coachella festival in California and is set to tour the US.

== Reception ==
Professional ratings
Kid A Mnesia
Aggregate scores
Source	Rating
Metacritic	97/100
Review scores
Source	Rating
Classic Rock	4.5/5 stars
Exclaim!	10/10
The Line of Best Fit	9/10
Mojo	5/5 stars
NME	4/5 stars
Paste	5.5/10
Pitchfork	9.2/10
Rolling Stone	5/5 stars
Uncut	4/5 stars
Under the Radar	10/10 stars

On the review aggregator website Metacritic, Kid A Mnesia has a score of 97 out of 100 based on 10 reviews, indicating "universal acclaim". The Mojo critic Danny Eccleston noted the influence of Kid A and Amnesiac on subsequent acts that had blended rock and electronic music. In Rolling Stone, Rob Sheffield wrote that Kid A Mnesia was "a stunning collection making the case for both albums as twin halves of the same musical statement ... a monument of Radiohead’s bravest, boldest music".

In the Times, Jonathan Dean said the Kid Amnesiae bonus disc was the reissue's "real gem". He praised the alternative version of "Like Spinning Plates", saying it demonstrated "a band hellbent on challenging what people thought they were", and described "Follow Me Around" as "a brilliant song made at the wrong time, by a band who had moved on". The NME critic Andrew Trendell wrote that the bonus disc "feels like as much a complete album as you could hope for ... [It] not only offers a mood piece, but also a companion and secret history behind the making of two essential, landmark records." In The Guardian, Phil Mongredien praised it as "a fascinating companion piece for two classic albums".

The Pitchfork critic Jayson Greene found the bonus disc lacked the "revelatory quality" of the bonus material included in Radiohead's 2017 OK Computer reissue OKNOTOK 1997 2017, with no "bolt-from-the-blue alternate history that redefines our understanding of the band". The Paste critic Saby Reyes-Kulkarni found the reissue disappointing, with "an assortment of half-baked leftovers".

== Track listing ==
All tracks are written by Radiohead (Colin Greenwood, Jonny Greenwood, Ed O'Brien, Philip Selway, Thom Yorke), except where noted.

Kid A
No.	Title	Length
1.	"Everything in Its Right Place"	4:11
2.	"Kid A"	4:44
3.	"The National Anthem"	5:51
4.	"How to Disappear Completely"	5:56
5.	"Treefingers"	3:42
6.	"Optimistic"	5:15
7.	"In Limbo"	3:31
8.	"Idioteque" (Radiohead, Paul Lansky, Arthur Kreiger)	5:09
9.	"Morning Bell"	4:35
10.	"Motion Picture Soundtrack" (song ends at 3:20; includes an untitled hidden track from 4:17 until 5:09, followed by 1:52 of silence)	7:01
Total length:		49:57

Amnesiac
No.	Title	Length
11.	"Packt Like Sardines in a Crushd Tin Box"	4:00
12.	"Pyramid Song"	4:49
13.	"Pulk/Pull Revolving Doors"	4:07
14.	"You and Whose Army?"	3:11
15.	"I Might Be Wrong"	4:54
16.	"Knives Out"	4:15
17.	"Morning Bell/Amnesiac"	3:14
18.	"Dollars and Cents"	4:52
19.	"Hunting Bears"	2:01
20.	"Like Spinning Plates"	3:57
21.	"Life in a Glasshouse"	4:34
Total length:		43:57

Kid Amnesiae
No.	Title	Length
22.	"Like Spinning Plates" ('Why Us?' Version)	5:04
23.	"Untitled v1"	1:48
24.	"Fog" (Again Again Version)	2:25
25.	"If You Say the Word"	4:22
26.	"Follow Me Around"	5:19
27.	"Pulk/Pull" (True Love Waits Version)	2:46
28.	"Untitled v2"	0:46
29.	"The Morning Bell" (In the Dark Version)	2:00
30.	"Pyramid Strings"	1:18
31.	"Alt. Fast Track"	1:32
32.	"Untitled v3"	1:16
33.	"How to Disappear into Strings"	5:32
Total length:		34:08

=== Notes ===
- "Idioteque" contains two samples from the Odyssey record First Recordings – Electronic Music Winners (1976): Paul Lansky's "Mild und Leise" and Arthur Kreiger's "Short Piece".

== Personnel ==
=== Radiohead ===
- Colin Greenwood
- Jonny Greenwood
- Ed O'Brien
- Philip Selway
- Thom Yorke

=== Additional musicians ===
- Orchestra of St John's – strings
  - John Lubbock – conducting
  - Jonny Greenwood – scoring
- Horns on "The National Anthem"
  - Andy Bush – trumpet
  - Steve Hamilton – alto saxophone (credited simply as "alto")
  - Martin Hathaway – alto saxophone (etc.)
  - Andy Hamilton – tenor saxophone
  - Mark Lockheart – tenor saxophone
  - Stan Harrison – baritone saxophone
  - Liam Kerkman – trombone
  - Mike Kearsey – bass trombone
- Henry Binns – rhythm sampling on "The National Anthem"
- The Humphrey Lyttelton Band ("Life in a Glasshouse")
  - Humphrey Lyttelton – trumpet, bandleader
  - Jimmy Hastings – clarinet
  - Pete Strange – trombone
  - Paul Bridge – double bass
  - Adrian Macintosh – drums

=== Technical personnel ===
- Nigel Godrich – production, engineering, mixing
- Radiohead – production
- Dan Grech-Marguerat – engineering (track 21)
- Chris Blair – mastering (tracks 1–10)
- Bob Ludwig – mastering (tracks 12–21)
- Gerard Navarro – production assistance, engineering assistance
- Graeme Stewart – engineering assistance

=== Artwork ===
- Stanley Donwood – pictures, design ("Landscapes, Knives and Glue")
- Tchocky – pictures ("Landscapes, Knives and Glue")

== Charts ==
Chart performance for Kid A Mnesia
Chart (2021)	Peak position
Australian Albums (ARIA)	3
Austrian Albums (Ö3 Austria)	31
Belgian Albums (Ultratop Flanders)	9
Belgian Albums (Ultratop Wallonia)	17
Canadian Albums (Billboard)	34
Danish Albums (Hitlisten)	11
Dutch Albums (Album Top 100)	6
Finnish Albums (Suomen virallinen lista)	29
French Albums (SNEP)	42
German Albums (Offizielle Top 100)	7
Irish Albums (Official Charts)	3
Italian Albums (FIMI)	29
Japanese Albums (Oricon)	7
Japanese Hot Albums (Billboard Japan)	14
New Zealand Albums (RMNZ)	5
Norwegian Albums (VG-lista)	23
Portuguese Albums (AFP)	8
Scottish Albums (Official Charts)	3
Spanish Albums (Promusicae)	24
Swiss Albums (Schweizer Hitparade)	10
UK Albums (Official Charts)	4
UK Independent Albums (Official Charts)	1
UK Progressive Albums (Official Charts)	1
US Billboard 200	12
US Independent Albums (Billboard)	2
US Top Alternative Albums (Billboard)	1
US Top Rock Albums (Billboard)	1

== Certifications ==
Certifications for Kid A Mnesia
Region	Certification	Certified units/sales
New Zealand (RMNZ)	Gold	7,500^{‡}
^{‡} Sales+streaming figures based on certification alone.
