= Itchy =

Itchy may refer to:

== Entertainment ==
=== Characters ===
- A fictional animated mouse in The Itchy & Scratchy Show, the show-within-a-show on The Simpsons
- Attichitcuk, Chewbacca's father in 1978's The Star Wars Holiday Special, nicknamed "Itchy"
- A villain from the Dick Tracy comic strip
- Itchy Itchiford, a character from All Dogs Go to Heaven
- A character in the 1952 musical Wish You Were Here

=== Other entertainment ===
- Itchy (band), a German punk rock band
- "Itchy", an episode of the television series Zoboomafoo

== Other uses ==
- The feeling of an itch
- ITCHY, a technique used in protein engineering

== See also ==
- Itch (disambiguation)
