= Ick =

Ick or ICK may refer to:

- Ick, a character in the children's television show It's a Big Big World
- Islamic Community of Kosovo, a religious organization in Kosovo
- Inhibitor cystine knot, a protein structural motif
- Institute of Christ the King Sovereign Priest, a society of apostolic life of pontifical right
- Intercity Korte, a Dutch train-coach
- Intestinal cell (MAK-like) kinase, a human protein involved in organ development
- The ick, Generation Z slang term for romantic disgust
- William Ick (1800–1844), an English botanist and geologist
- Ick (film), a 2024 science fiction horror comedy film

== See also ==
- IK (disambiguation)
- Ich (disambiguation)
