= Follow Me Around =

2021 single by Radiohead

Single by Radiohead

from the album Kid A Mnesia
- Released: 1 November 2021
- Recorded: January 1999 – April 2000
- Genre: Acoustic rock
- Length: 5:19
- Label: XL
- Songwriter: Radiohead
- Producers: Nigel Godrich; Radiohead

Radiohead singles chronology
| "If You Say the Word" (2021) | "Follow Me Around" (2021) |

Music video
- "Follow Me Around" on YouTube

"Follow Me Around" is a song by the English rock band Radiohead, released on 1 November 2021 as the second single from the compilation album Kid A Mnesia. It features the singer, Thom Yorke, on acoustic guitar, with lyrics expressing paranoia and dread.

Radiohead recorded "Follow Me Around" during the joint sessions for their fourth and fifth studio albums, Kid A (2000) and Amnesiac (2001), but it went unreleased until 2021. It was accompanied by a music video starring Guy Pearce.

== Music ==
"Follow Me Around" features a solo performance by Thom Yorke on acoustic guitar, with a "soaring" chorus. The lyrics express paranoia and dread, and reference Margaret Thatcher. Earlier versions instead referenced Tony Blair. The A.V. Club described "Follow Me Around" as perhaps Radiohead's simplest pop song, likening it to Eddie Vedder. Rolling Stone said it was one of Yorke's darkest songs.

== History ==
"Follow Me Around" first appeared in the 1998 documentary Meeting People Is Easy, which includes a performance recorded during a soundcheck. After Radiohead performed it at a Toronto show in 2000, fans created a website demanding its release. Bootleg recordings circulated online and the song became a fan favourite.

Radiohead recorded "Follow Me Around" during the sessions for their albums Kid A (2000) and Amnesiac (2001), recorded simultaneously. In an online diary written during the sessions, the guitarist Ed O'Brien wrote that they wanted to find a new approach rather than "fall into old habits". It went unreleased, which critics surmised was because it did not fit the albums' experimental style.

In the following years, Yorke performed "Follow Me Around" occasionally with Radiohead, in solo performances, and with his side project Atoms for Peace. He and the Radiohead guitarist Jonny Greenwood performed a rearranged version in 2017.

== Release ==
Radiohead released "Follow Me Around" on the 2021 compilation album Kid A Mnesia. It was released as the second single on 1 November. The day before the release, Radiohead uploaded a full-quality clip of the performance from Meeting People is Easy to their YouTube channel.

The "Follow Me Around" music video features the actor Guy Pearce being chased by a drone camera. It was directed by Us, a directing duo consisting of Chris Barrett and Luke Taylor. Pearce said the video was recorded a few weeks before the release.

== Reception ==
Several publications celebrated the release of a long-awaited fan favourite. The Times wrote that it was the best of the bonus content on Kid A Mnesia and described it as "a brilliant song made at the wrong time, by a band who had moved on and who, eventually, moved a lot of fans with them too. Because Kid A was not just pop music; it was about educating fans in what pop music could be."

== Personnel ==
=== Radiohead ===
- Colin Greenwood
- Jonny Greenwood
- Ed O'Brien
- Philip Selway
- Thom Yorke

=== Additional personnel ===
- Nigel Godrich – production, engineering, mixing
- Gerard Navarro – production assistance, additional engineering
- Graeme Stewart – additional engineering
