= Itch (disambiguation) =

An itch is an unpleasant sensation that evokes the desire or reflex to scratch

Itch or Itching may also refer to:

== Arts, entertainment, and media ==
- Itch (EP), a 1994 Radiohead EP
- Itch (album), a 1994 solo album by Kim Mitchell
- Itch (TV series), a 2020 Australian children's TV series
- "Itchin'", a single by Jimmy Jones
- The Itch (House), an episode of the US TV series House
- Itch, a 2012 novel by Simon Mayo
- "Itch", a season 4 episode of Servant (TV series)

== Other uses ==
- ITCH (gene), an ubiquitin-activating enzyme
- itch.io, an online videogame distribution marketplace
- Jonny "Itch" Fox, British musician

== See also ==
- Itchy (disambiguation)
- Eetch, a traditional Armenian side dish made principally from bulgur
