= If You Say the Word =

2021 single by Radiohead

Single by Radiohead

from the album Kid A Mnesia
- Released: 7 September 2021
- Recorded: January 1999 – April 2000
- Genre: Alternative rock; electronica
- Length: 4:22
- Label: XL
- Songwriter: Radiohead
- Producers: Nigel Godrich; Radiohead

Radiohead singles chronology
"Man of War" (2017)	"If You Say the Word" (2021)	"Follow Me Around" (2021)

Music video
- "If You Say the Word" on YouTube

"If You Say the Word" is a song by the English rock band Radiohead, released on 7 September 2021 as the first single from the compilation Kid A Mnesia. It was recorded during the joint sessions for Radiohead's albums Kid A (2000) and Amnesiac (2001), but remained unreleased until 2021.

== Music ==
"If You Say the Word" features "delicate" fingerpicking, a "foreboding groove", "chiming" percussion and ondes Martenot.

== Music video ==
Radiohead released a video for "If You Say the Word" on 23 September 2021. It was directed by Kasper Häggström and features a crew capturing businessmen from nature and taking them to work in London. Spin likened the video to the science fiction series Black Mirror. The video won "Best Alternative Video" at the 2022 UK Music Video Awards.

== Reception ==
Writing for Pitchfork, Marc Hogan described "If You Say the Word" as "lush and elegant". He observed that the lyrics seem both loving and threatening, and wrote that it "doesn't immediately stand out as fodder for a Radiohead best-of playlist, it's still of such strikingly high quality that it's surprising it hasn't surfaced before now". Contact Music described it as a "typically melancholy ambient number" in line with other material from Kid A and Amnesiac.

== Personnel ==
=== Radiohead ===
- Colin Greenwood
- Jonny Greenwood
- Ed O'Brien
- Philip Selway
- Thom Yorke

Additional personnel

- Nigel Godrich – production, engineering, mixing
- Gerard Navarro – production assistance, additional engineering
- Graeme Stewart – additional engineering
