= OK Computer OKNOTOK 1997 2017 =

2017 compilation by Radiohead

Compilation album by Radiohead
- Released: 23 June 2017
- Recorded: 4 September 1995 ("Lucky"); July 1996, September 1996 – March 1997
- Studios: Canned Applause (Didcot); St Catherine's Court (Bath); Chipping Norton (Oxfordshire); Abbey Road (London)
- Genres: Alternative rock; art rock
- Length: 91:39
- Label: XL
- Producer: Nigel Godrich

Radiohead chronology
A Moon Shaped Pool (2016)	OK Computer OKNOTOK 1997 2017 (2017)	MiniDiscs [Hacked] (2019)

OK Computer OKNOTOK 1997 2017 is a reissue of the 1997 album OK Computer by the English rock band Radiohead. It was released in June 2017, the 20th anniversary of OK Computer, following the acquisition of Radiohead's back catalogue by XL Recordings from EMI in 2016.

OKNOTOK comprises remastered versions of OK Computer and its B-sides, plus three previously unreleased songs: "I Promise", "Man of War" and "Lift". The special edition includes an art book, notes, and a cassette tape of demos and session recordings. Unlike previous Radiohead reissues, which were released by EMI and contained no new material, Radiohead curated the OKNOTOK material themselves.

Radiohead promoted OKNOTOK with a teaser campaign of posters and videos. Music videos were released for the three new songs, and "I Promise" and "Man of War" were released as singles. OKNOTOK debuted at number two in the UK Albums Chart and was the bestselling album in UK independent record stores for a year. In the US, it reached number 23 on the Billboard 200. It received acclaim, particularly for its bonus material.

== Content ==
OK Computer OKNOTOK 1997 2017 comprises remastered versions of Radiohead's 1997 album OK Computer and its eight B-sides, plus three previously unreleased tracks: "I Promise", featuring strummed acoustic guitar, marching band-like drums, and a Mellotron; "Man of War", a ballad with strings, piano, and electric guitar; and "Lift", a Britpop-like ballad.

The special edition includes the album on vinyl, a hardcover art book, a book of notes written by the songwriter, Thom Yorke, and a sketchbook of preparatory artwork by Yorke and the cover artist, Stanley Donwood. It also includes a cassette containing audio experiments, session recordings, demos (including demos for two previously unheard songs), and early versions of four songs released on later albums: "The National Anthem", "Motion Picture Soundtrack", "Nude" and "True Love Waits".

The final track on the cassette, "OK Computer Program", comprises computer tones. When run on a ZX Spectrum computer, the tones load a short computer program. The program lists the band members and the date 19 December 1996, plays several minutes of electronic tones, and displays the text: "Congratulations....you've found the secret message syd lives hmmmm. We should get out more". OKNOTOK is dedicated to Rachel Owen, Yorke's ex-wife, who died from cancer months prior to the release.

== Promotion and release ==
Bonus cassette included with the special edition

OKNOTOK was the first Radiohead compilation released after their back catalogue was transferred from EMI to XL Recordings in 2016. Previous compilations were not remastered, contained no new material and were issued without Radiohead's involvement after their contract with EMI ended in 2003.

Radiohead announced OKNOTOK on 2 May 2017. It was promoted with posters in cities around the world featuring cryptic messages, and a teaser video featuring "glitchy" computer graphics and lyrics from "Climbing Up the Walls". Radiohead temporarily restored their website to its 1997 state.

The download and CD editions were released on 23 June 2017, and the boxed edition shipped in July. Radiohead released "I Promise" on 2 June and "Man of War" on 22 June as downloads for those who had pre-ordered OKNOTOK, accompanied by music videos. A video for "Lift" followed on 12 September.

On 11 July, Radiohead released an "unboxing" video previewing the contents of the special edition. The video features Chieftain Mews, a character who appears in Radiohead's webcasts and promotional material. In December 2019, Radiohead uploaded all their albums, including OKNOTOK, to YouTube. In January 2020, they added the OKNOTOK special edition cassette to their website as part of the Radiohead Public Library, an online archive of their work.

== Sales ==
OKNOTOK debuted at number two in the UK Albums Chart, boosted by Radiohead's third headline performance at Glastonbury Festival. It was the bestselling album in UK independent record shops between April 2017 and April 2018. In the US, it sold 13,000 copies in its first week, reaching number 36 on the Billboard 200. Following the release of the vinyl and boxed editions, OKNOTOK re-entered the chart at number 23, selling another 17,000 copies (including 8,000 on vinyl and 7,000 on CD). On 19 October 2018, it was certified gold by the BPI for sales of over 100,000.

== Reception ==
Professional ratings
OK Computer OKNOTOK 1997 2017
Aggregate scores
Source	Rating
Metacritic	100/100
Review scores
Source	Rating
Consequence of Sound	A+
Drowned in Sound	10/10
The Guardian	5/5 stars
Mojo	5/5 stars
The Observer	5/5 stars
Pitchfork	10/10
Q	5/5 stars
Rolling Stone	5/5 stars
Uncut	5/5 stars

On the review aggregator website Metacritic, OKNOTOK has a score of 100 out of 100 based on 15 reviews, indicating "universal acclaim". Praise focused on the previously unreleased material. The Observer wrote that the reissue, with its "excellent" unreleased songs, proved that Radiohead were "the world's greatest rock band, pushing the limits of what they, or anyone else, could achieve". Pitchfork wrote that the best feature was "hearing how the lost material informs the original album". PopMatters selected "Man of War" as the best of the new tracks. Some critics felt "Lift" lacked energy compared to live bootlegs from the period.

The Record Collector critic Jamie Atkins praised the special edition, particularly its version of "Motion Picture Soundtrack", writing: "To these ears it's one of the performances of [Yorke's] career. He begins sounding utterly wounded until – as if revelling in the places his voice is capable of taking the song – it ends up becoming something quite defiant."

== Track listing ==
All tracks are written by Thom Yorke, Jonny Greenwood, Philip Selway, Ed O'Brien and Colin Greenwood.

Main album
No.	Title	Length
1.	"Airbag"	4:44
2.	"Paranoid Android"	6:23
3.	"Subterranean Homesick Alien"	4:27
4.	"Exit Music (For a Film)"	4:24
5.	"Let Down"	4:59
6.	"Karma Police"	4:21
7.	"Fitter Happier"	1:57
8.	"Electioneering"	3:50
9.	"Climbing Up the Walls"	4:45
10.	"No Surprises"	3:48
11.	"Lucky"	4:19
12.	"The Tourist"	5:24
Total length:		53:21

Bonus disc
No.	Title	Origin	Length
1.	"I Promise"	Previously unreleased	3:59
2.	"Man of War"	Previously unreleased	4:29
3.	"Lift"	Previously unreleased	4:06
4.	"Lull"	"Karma Police" single	2:25
5.	"Meeting in the Aisle"	"Karma Police" single	3:07
6.	"Melatonin"	"Paranoid Android" single	2:08
7.	"A Reminder"	"Paranoid Android" single	3:52
8.	"Polyethylene (Parts 1 & 2)"	"Paranoid Android" single	4:22
9.	"Pearly*"	"Paranoid Android" single	3:38
10.	"Palo Alto"	"No Surprises" single	3:51
11.	"How I Made My Millions"	"No Surprises" single	3:07
Total length:			38:18

Special edition cassette – Side A (Note: No official track lengths for the white cassette have been released. As such, track lengths shown are simply a best approximation.)
No.	Title	Length
1.	"Zx Spectrum Symphony"	1:18
2.	"A.M.S. Hello"	0:19
3.	"True Love Tape Loop"	4:59
4.	"Let Down" (Thom 4track)	2:59
5.	"I May be Paranoid but Not an Android.."	0:16
6.	"Attention" (Thom 4track)	2:42
7.	"Noise Sketch by Nigel"	1:15
8.	"Climbing Up the Walls" (Abbey Road Strings)	1:15
9.	"Someone Help This Guy.."	0:30
10.	"Motion Picture Soundtrack" (Solo Piano)	5:13
11.	"Was That Recording?"	0:15
12.	"The Jumbled Words of Climbing Up the Walls Read by Little Dan Clements"	1:21
13.	"Lull" (Ed Guitar Infinite Reverb)	1:31
14.	"Airbag Drums Through Moog"	1:07
15.	"Karma Police in Space Echo"	1:56
16.	"Karma Police Voice Through Telephone" (Talking)	0:34
17.	"Piano Sketch by Jonny"	0:40
18.	"Big Bird Story by Stanley Donwood"	2:04
19.	"No Surprises" (First Idea From a Soundcheck Somewhere)	2:58
20.	"Radio Chaser Noise"	0:24
21.	"Fridge Buzz"	0:11
22.	"True Love Space Loop" (Talking)	1:29
23.	"Are You Someone?"	3:35
Total length:		38:50

Special edition cassette – Side B
No.	Title	Length
1.	"Nigel A.M.S Delay"	0:54
2.	"Jonny's Radio from Climbing Up the Walls"	1:15
3.	"Climbing Up the Walls" (Thom 4track)	3:58
4.	"A Piano Lies Down in the Middle of the Road"	2:36
5.	"Transposing Noise Sketch by Nigel"	2:07
6.	"Early Paranoid Android Version Jonny & Thom"	1:22
7.	"Alternative Paranoid Android Ending" (Live in Pittsburg)	2:21
8.	"Airbag Early Acoustic Version" (Talking)	4:38
9.	"Paranoid Android Loud Room at St Catherine's"	0:56
10.	"Nigel A.M.S. Paranoid Guitar Sample"	1:44
11.	"Nude Early Band Version"	5:31
12.	"The National Anthem" (Thom 4track)	3:19
13.	"Ambient Loops"	0:45
14.	"Man of War" (Live in Montpellier)	4:28
15.	"Nigel A.M.S. Again"	0:37
16.	"Thom's Acoustic as Microphone in Climbing Up the Walls"	2:23
17.	"Ok Computer Program"	1:57
Total length:		40:52

== Personnel ==
- Nigel Godrich – committing to tape, production
- Radiohead – committing to tape, music, strings arrangement
  - Thom Yorke
  - Jonny Greenwood
  - Philip Selway
  - Ed O'Brien
  - Colin Greenwood
- Nick Ingman – strings conducting
- Gerard Navarro – original studio assistance
- Jon Bailey – original studio assistance
- Chris Scard – original studio assistance
- Royal Philharmonic Orchestra – strings on "Man of War"
  - Robert Ziegler – conducting
  - Sam Petts Davis – engineering
  - Fiona Cruickshank – engineering
- Bob Ludwig – remastering
- Stanley Donwood – pictures
- The White Chocolate Farm – pictures

== Charts ==
=== Weekly charts ===
Chart performance for OK Computer OKNOTOK 1997 2017
Chart (2017)	Peak position
Australian Albums (ARIA)	6
Belgian Albums (Ultratop Flanders)	10
Belgian Albums (Ultratop Wallonia)	6
Canadian Albums (Billboard)	10
Dutch Albums (Album Top 100)	5
Finnish Albums (Suomen virallinen lista)	12
German Albums (Offizielle Top 100)	13
Italian Albums (FIMI)	11
Japanese Albums (Oricon)	8
New Zealand Albums (RMNZ)	7
Norwegian Albums (VG-lista)	20
Polish Albums (ZPAV)	18
Portuguese Albums (AFP)	6
Scottish Albums (Official Charts)	1
Spanish Albums (PROMUSICAE)	11
Swiss Albums (Schweizer Hitparade)	16
UK Albums (Official Charts)	2
US Billboard 200	23
US Top Alternative Albums (Billboard)	3
US Top Rock Albums (Billboard)	3

Chart (2026)	Peak position
Croatian International Albums (HDU)	15
Hungarian Physical Albums (MAHASZ)	30

=== Year-end charts ===
Chart (2017)	Position
Belgian Albums (Ultratop Flanders)	140
US Top Rock Albums (Billboard)	94
