= Meeting People Is Easy =

1998 music documentary

- VHS cover
- Directed by: Grant Gee
- Produced by: Dilly Gent
- Cinematography: Grant Gee
- Edited by: Jerry Chater
- Music by: Radiohead
- Production companies: Kudos Pictures; Parlophone
- Distributed by: EMI
- Release date: 30 November 1998
- Running time: 95 minutes
- Country: United Kingdom
- Language: English

Meeting People Is Easy is a 1998 British documentary film by Grant Gee that follows the English rock band Radiohead on the world tour for their 1997 album OK Computer. It received positive reviews and was nominated for a Grammy Award for Best Music Film at the 42nd Annual Grammy Awards in 2000. It sold more than half a million copies on VHS and DVD.

== Summary ==
Meeting People Is Easy documents the promotion and tour for Radiohead's third album, OK Computer, which began on 22 May 1997 in Barcelona, Spain. It comprises footage of Radiohead working on music, filming music videos and promotional material, giving interviews and performing. It includes footage of the filming of the "No Surprises" music video and the failed studio session for the song "Man of War", and a performance of "Karma Police" on the Late Show with David Letterman.

The documentary captures the band members' stress during the tour, which the bassist, Colin Greenwood, later said was the lowest point of Radiohead's career. The journalist Alex Ross described the film as "a kind of counterstrike against the music press, recording scores of pointless interviews with dead-tired members of the band". The singer, Thom Yorke, said the goal was to dispel myths about the glamour of being in a rock band.

== Production ==
According to the director, Grant Gee, Radiohead sat in hotel suites for days giving interviews. To record each interview, Gee "[ran] around, leaving a microphone in one room, going and filming something in another". He placed surveillance cameras in the band's dressing room, which he said foreshadowed the rise of reality television such as Big Brother: "We were doing it in a slightly more arty way, but it's the same ... Radiohead Big Brother is what I think of that film in a way." Greenwood said Gee recorded around 40 hours of footage, and Radiohead gave him freedom to edit it.

Radiohead's co-manager, Chris Hufford, said Meeting People Is Easy was "psychologically honest" and that he found it depressing to watch: "Seeing that going on where there should have been pride and joy. I knew they were readdressing how they looked to themselves, each other and the outside world." The drummer, Philip Selway, said the film was the result of how Gee perceived the period, and that other times on the tour were "much lighter". According to Yorke, Gee refused their requests to include moments of positivity.

In 2020, Yorke wrote: "I've never really watched this since it was completed. I couldn't because it would send me back down a mental hole that would take me days to recover from. But now skimming through it looks kind of funny, sad and alarming at the same time. I still recognise us all. But would have had some strong words for myself at this point."

== Release ==
Meeting People Is Easy was released in the UK on VHS on 30 November 1998, and on DVD on 12 June 2000. It was released in both formats on 18 May 1999 in the US. It was the first DVD released by Radiohead's record label, EMI.

In the UK, Channel 4 broadcast Meeting People is Easy on 6 May 1999. In the US, MTV broadcast a premiere of the film on 16 May 1999, and the Sundance Channel broadcast it nine times during May 2000. After Radiohead's new record company, XL, purchased their back catalogue from EMI, Radiohead made Meeting People Is Easy available to stream free on their website along with other archived material.

== Reception ==
Meeting People Is Easy sold more than half a million copies on DVD and VHS. It was nominated for the "Best Music Film" category at the 2000 Grammy Awards. It received an average rating of 6.5/10 on Rotten Tomatoes, giving it a 71% "fresh" rating. The reviewer Jessica Brandt of theshrubbery.com gave five out of five. Troy Patterson, a critic for Entertainment Weekly, gave it B+, calling it "an expressive mood piece creepy with cosmopolitan paranoia and bracingly somber bombast".

Kevin Archibald of IGN gave Meeting People Is Easy eight out of ten. Bart Blasengame gave it four out of five, writing: "Instead of taking the usual tour documentary approach and dwelling on individual concerts or behind-the-scenes banter between the band, Gee's film focuses on the absurdity of being an important rock band in the current musical landscape—the shallow marketing of the band, the endless stream of redundant interviews, the blinding photo shoots and awkward television appearances." In Uncut, Stephen Dalton wrote that "this queasily beautiful tapestry of millennial unease was the Koyaanisqatsi of rockumentaries". In 2020, Pitchfork wrote that it "remains a cautionary tale" and wrote that the footage of the "Man of War" recording sessions was a highlight.
