= Man of War (song) =

2017 single by Radiohead

Single by Radiohead

from the album OK Computer OKNOTOK 1997 2017
- Released: 22 June 2017
- Recorded: February 1996
- Studio: Chipping Norton, Oxfordshire
- Genre: Alternative rock
- Length: 4:29
- Label: XL
- Songwriter: Radiohead
- Producers: Nigel Godrich; Radiohead

Radiohead singles chronology
"I Promise" (2017)	"Man of War" (2017)	"If You Say the Word" (2021)

Music video
- "Man of War" on YouTube

"Man of War" is a song by the English rock band Radiohead, released on 22 June 2017 on the compilation album OK Computer OKNOTOK 1997 2017.

Radiohead first performed "Man of War" while on tour for their second album, The Bends (1995). The singer, Thom Yorke, described it as a homage to James Bond themes. Radiohead recorded a version during the early sessions for their third album, OK Computer (1997), but abandoned it as they felt it was too similar to The Bends. They recorded a rearranged version for the 1998 film The Avengers, but were unsatisfied with the results and it went unreleased.

Years later, Radiohead submitted "Man of War" for the 2015 James Bond film Spectre, but it was rejected as it had not been written for the film. They submitted another song, "Spectre", which also went unused. "Man of War" remained unreleased until 2017, when it was included on the OK Computer reissue OKNOTOK 1997 2017.

== History ==
=== OK Computer version ===
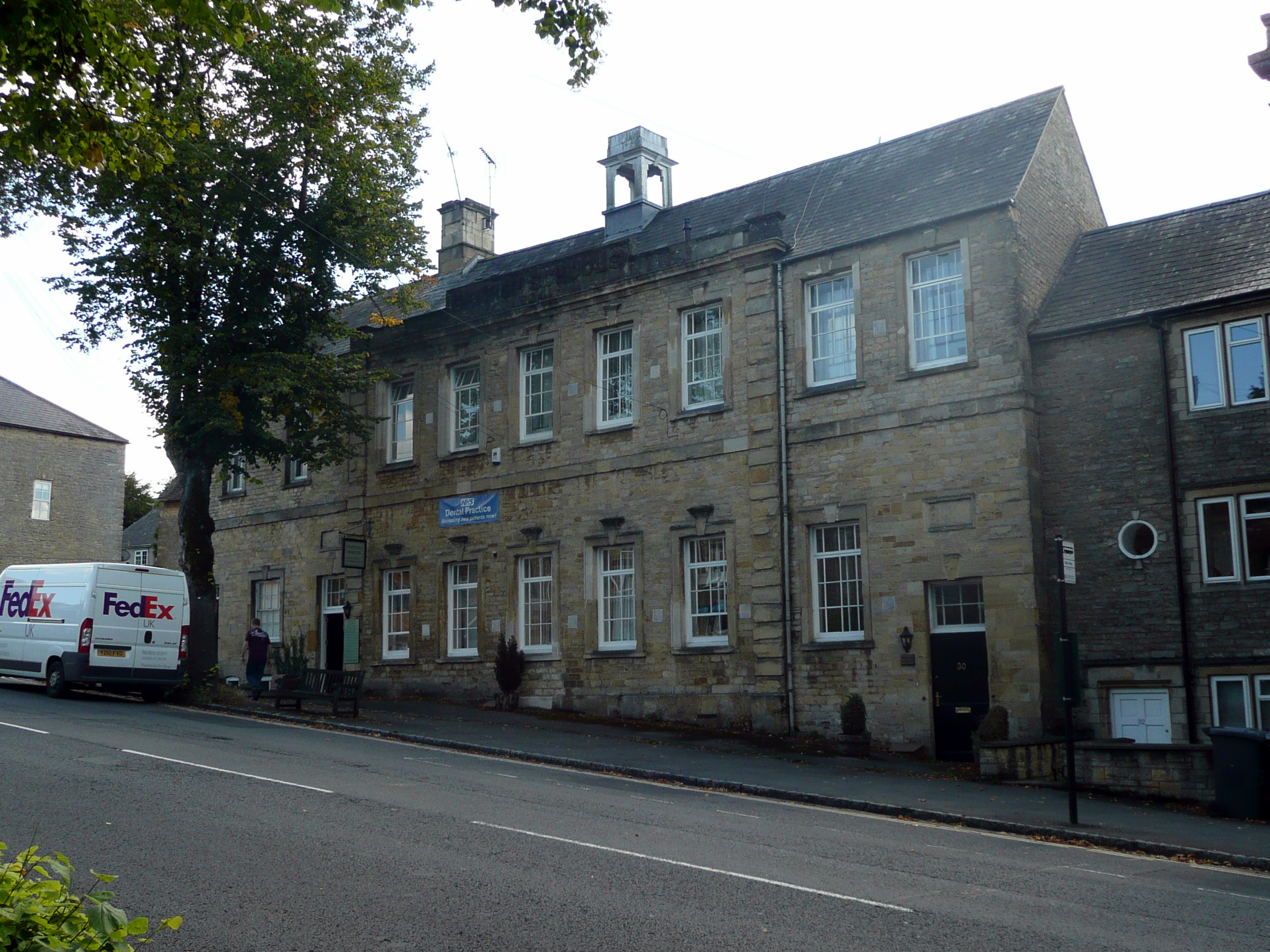
The former Chipping Norton Recording Studios, Oxfordshire, where Radiohead recorded "Man of War" in 1996

Radiohead performed "Man of War" several times while on tour for their second album, The Bends, in 1995. It had the working title "Big Boots". The singer, Thom Yorke, said it was a written as a homage to James Bond themes. On the same tour, Radiohead covered "Nobody Does It Better", Carly Simon's theme from the 1977 Bond film The Spy Who Loved Me.

Radiohead considered recording "Man of War" as a B-side for the Bends single "Street Spirit (Fade Out)". Instead, they recorded a version in February 1996 in the first sessions for their third album, OK Computer (1997), at Chipping Norton Recording Studios, Oxfordshire, with their producer, Nigel Godrich. However, it went unreleased. According to the drummer, Philip Selway, Radiohead felt "Man of War" was too similar to The Bends and they wanted to explore new styles. He said "we knew that it was a good song, but it never really found its place".

=== Avengers version ===
In March 1998, Radiohead and Godrich recorded a rearranged version of "Man of War" in Abbey Road Studios for the 1998 spy film The Avengers, but this was abandoned. This version contained electronic elements. Footage of the recording session appears in the 1998 documentary Meeting People Is Easy. Yorke said: "We were so messed up and we went in, tried to do the track, but we just couldn't do it. It was actually a really difficult period of time. We had a five-week break and all the shit was coming to the surface ... It was a real low point after it."

=== Spectre version ===
Years later, Radiohead submitted "Man of War" as the theme for the 2015 James Bond film Spectre. The director, Sam Mendes, and the James Bond actor, Daniel Craig, were both Radiohead fans. In July 2015, the bookmaker William Hill suspended bets after a customer placed £15,000 at ten-to-one odds on Radiohead recording the next Bond theme, suspecting insider knowledge.

The Spectre producers rejected "Man of War" as it had not been written for the film and so would be ineligible for the Academy Award for Best Original Song. Mendes said that "you want to feel like it's written just for the movie". Radiohead suspended work on their ninth album, A Moon Shaped Pool (2016), to record another theme, "Spectre", but the film producers rejected it as too dark. They instead used "Writing's on the Wall" by Sam Smith.

=== Release ===
In June 2017, Radiohead released "Man of War" on the OK Computer reissue OKNOTOK 1997 2017 alongside two other previously unreleased tracks: "I Promise" and "Lift". The final release was based on the version recorded at Chipping Norton in 1996. According to Selway, "This is the version of the song we all felt best captured what was good about it."

== Composition ==
Rolling Stone described "Man of War" as a "crisp mid-tempo ballad" with strings, piano, and "shards of distressed electric guitar". It opens with a guitar figure before a distorted chorus. The lyrics are "anxious" and "nerve-racking", with the refrain "the worms will come for you". Drowned in Sound described "Man of War" as "grandiose" and the inverse of Radiohead's other Bond theme, "Spectre".

== Music video ==
The "Man of War" music video, directed by Colin Read, was released in June 2017 on YouTube. The video alternates from day to night, with the mood shifting from "cheerful to paranoid". It follows a man walking from a park who appears carefree by day but "seems to be hiding something" at night.

== Reception ==
PopMatters praised "Man of War" as the strongest of the OKNOTOK bonus tracks, and argued that it could have appeared on the original OK Computer. The PopMatters critics awarded it an average score of 8.3 out of 10. The Rolling Stone critic Will Hermes wrote that "Man of War" would not have fit OK Computer lyrically, but that it was an "after-the-fact" classic. He praised Jonny Greenwood's "swaggering rock-dude guitar squeals", Yorke's surreal lyrics and the "sparkling tick-tock rhythm", which he likened to the 1973 song "Time" by Pink Floyd.

== Personnel ==
=== Radiohead ===
- Colin Greenwood
- Jonny Greenwood
- Ed O'Brien
- Philip Selway
- Thom Yorke

=== Additional personnel ===
- Royal Philharmonic Orchestra – strings
- Bob Ludwig – mastering
- Stanley Donwood – illustrations
- Nigel Godrich – production, engineering
- Robert Ziegler – conducting
- Sam Petts Davis – engineering
- Fiona Cruickshank – engineering

== Charts ==
Chart (2017)	Peak position
France (SNEP)	178
