= No Surprises =

1998 single by Radiohead

Single by Radiohead

from the album OK Computer
- B-side: "Palo Alto"; "How I Made My Millions"
- Written: 1995
- Released: 12 January 1998
- Recorded: July 1996
- Studio: Canned Applause (Didcot, England)
- Genre: Dream pop
- Length: 3:49
- Label: Parlophone; Capitol
- Songwriter: Radiohead
- Producers: Nigel Godrich; Radiohead

Radiohead singles chronology
"Lucky" (1997)	"No Surprises" (1998)	"Pyramid Song" (2001)

Audio sample
- file; help

Music video
- "No Surprises" on YouTube

"No Surprises" is a song by the English rock band Radiohead, released as the fourth and final single from their third studio album, OK Computer (1997), in 1998.

The singer, Thom Yorke, wrote "No Surprises" while Radiohead were on tour with R.E.M. in 1995. It features glockenspiel and a "childlike" sound inspired by the 1966 Beach Boys album Pet Sounds. Yorke described it as a "fucked-up nursery rhyme", with a gentle mood and harsh lyrics conveying dissatisfaction with social or political order.

The music video, directed by Grant Gee, features Yorke wearing a helmet as it fills with water. It was inspired by science fiction, underwater escape acts, and the lyric "a job that slowly kills you", with Gee aiming to convey the feeling of "murderous seconds".

"No Surprises" reached number four on the UK singles chart. In 2011, NME named it the 107th-best track of the preceding 15 years.

== Recording ==
The Radiohead singer, Thom Yorke, wrote "No Surprises" while Radiohead were touring with R.E.M. in 1995. Yorke presented the song to both bands in a dressing room in Oslo on 3 August 1995 as a sketch called "No Surprises Please". Later, the lyrics were rewritten and a glockenspiel melody was added. The original lyrics referred to a girl who does not "take off her dress when she bleeds in the bathtub", which the journalist Tim Footman felt echoed the menstruation motifs of the songwriter Bill Callahan.

Yorke said the "childlike guitar sound set the mood for the whole album" and that Radiohead was aiming for a mood similar to the 1966 Beach Boys album Pet Sounds. Radiohead wanted to recreate the atmosphere of a song by Marvin Gaye or the Louis Armstrong song "What a Wonderful World".

Radiohead recorded many versions of "No Surprises", but felt they could not improve on the first take. Hoping to achieve a slower tempo than could be played well on their instruments, the producer, Nigel Godrich, had the band record the song at a faster tempo, then slowed the playback for Yorke to overdub his vocals onto, creating an "ethereal" effect.

The bassist, Colin Greenwood, said that "No Surprises" was Radiohead's "stadium-friendly" song. He said the concept was to frighten OK Computer listeners with "Climbing Up the Walls", then comfort them "with a pop song with a chorus that sounds like a lullaby". Yorke told Q: "If you play it right, it is fucking dark. But it's like acting. It's on the edge of totally hamming it up but you're not. It's just the words are so dark. When we play it, we have to play it so slow. It only sounds good if it's really fragile."

== Music and lyrics ==
"No Surprises" is in the key of F major. It features electric guitar (inspired by the Beach Boys' "Wouldn't It Be Nice"), acoustic guitar, glockenspiel and vocal harmonies. Yorke identified the subject of the song as "someone who's trying hard to keep it together but can't". The lyrics seem to portray a suicide or an unfulfilling life, and dissatisfaction with contemporary social and political order. Some lines refer to rural or suburban imagery. The gentle mood contrasts with the harsh lyrics, and Yorke described the song as a "fucked-up nursery rhyme". The journalist Sam Steele wrote, "Even when the subject is suicide ... [the] guitar is as soothing as balm on a red-raw psyche, the song rendered like a bittersweet child's prayer."

One of the key metaphors is the opening line, "a heart that's full up like a landfill". Yorke said the song "stems from my unhealthy obsession of what to do with plastic boxes and plastic bottles ... All this stuff is getting buried, the debris of our lives. It doesn't rot, it just stays there. That's how we deal, that's how I deal with stuff, I bury it." According to Yorke, American audiences reacted passionately to the lines "bring down the government / they don't speak for us" during Radiohead's 2003 tour.

== Release ==
"No Surprises" was released as the fourth single from OK Computer in 1998 and reached number four on the UK singles chart. In the US, it was serviced to modern rock radio on 27 April 1998. As of March 2025, "No Surprises" was Radiohead's most streamed song after their debut single, "Creep", with more than 1 billion streams.

In October 2011, NME named "No Surprises" the 107th-best track of the preceding 15 years. In 2020, the Guardian named it the 29th-greatest Radiohead song, writing: "Can a radical conscience coexist with suburban comforts, 'No Surprises' asks? For all that it soothes, this one is pessimistic."

In 2008, "No Surprises" was included in Radiohead: The Best Of. An early version with different lyrics was included in the 2017 OK Computer reissue OKNOTOK 1997 2017. More early versions were released on the 2019 compilation MiniDiscs [Hacked]. According to NME, these versions begin as a more upbeat ballad in the style of Radiohead's 1995 album The Bends, with an extended guitar outro, and progress to a "grandiloquent lullaby".

== Music video ==
The music video for "No Surprises" consists of a single close-up shot of Yorke inside a helmet. The lyrics slowly scroll upwards, reflected in the helmet. After the first verse, the helmet begins to fill with water. Yorke continues singing as he attempts to lift his head above the rising water. Once the helmet completely fills, Yorke is motionless for over a minute, after which the water is released and he resumes singing.

Yorke in the music video (top) and filming the music video (bottom)

The video was directed by Grant Gee and was shot on 28 November 1997. Initially, Radiohead and their record label, Parlophone, planned to film videos for each track on OK Computer. Gee pitched concepts for "No Surprises" and "Fitter Happier". His initial concept for "No Surprises", which Gee later described as "some kind of sparkly music-box themed performance-based nonsense", was rejected. His "Fitter Happier" concept was abandoned when Parlophone decided to shoot videos only for the singles.

Six months later, after Gee had been filming Radiohead for the documentary Meeting People Is Easy, Parlophone asked Gee to pitch another concept for "No Surprises". Gee listened to the song while studying an image of the astronaut character David Bowman in the 1968 science fiction film 2001: A Space Odyssey, and wondered if he could make a music video comprising a close-up of a man in a helmet. He was also inspired by childhood memories of underwater escape acts and alien characters in the television series UFO with helmets full of liquid. He fixated on the lyric "a job that slowly kills you", and conceived a real-time video that would convey the feeling of "murderous seconds".

The crew hired a special effects company to create a perspex helmet, into which water could be slowly pumped and which would allow Yorke to release the water in an emergency. To reduce the time for which Yorke had to hold his breath, the crew sped up part of the song, doubled the camera speed from 25 to 50 frames per second to match, and then decelerated both the song and frame rate after the water drained, keeping Yorke's vocals in synchronisation. Although Yorke had demonstrated that he could hold his breath for over a minute in stress-free conditions, when shooting he found it difficult to hold his breath for more than ten seconds before draining the water. According to Gee, "The day turned into a horror show ... [It was] repeated torture." Footage of the shoot appears in Meeting People is Easy, with Yorke becoming increasingly frustrated. After many attempts, with coaching from the assistant director, Yorke eventually completed a take.

== Track listings ==
All songs were written by Radiohead (Thom Yorke, Jonny Greenwood, Ed O'Brien, Colin Greenwood and Philip Selway).

CD 1
No.	Title	Length
1.	"No Surprises"	3:51
2.	"Palo Alto"	3:44
3.	"How I Made My Millions"	3:07
Total length:		10:42

CD 2
No.	Title	Length
1.	"No Surprises"	3:50
2.	"Airbag (Live in Berlin)"	4:49
3.	"Lucky (Live in Florence)"	4:34
Total length:		13:13

== Charts ==
=== Weekly charts ===
Chart (1998)	Peak position
Australia (ARIA)	47
Belgium (Ultratip Bubbling Under Flanders)	13
Europe (Eurochart Hot 100)	27
France (SNEP)	31
Iceland (Íslenski Listinn Topp 40)	9
Ireland (IRMA)	13
Netherlands (Dutch Top 40 Tipparade)	14
Netherlands (Single Top 100)	58
New Zealand (Recorded Music NZ)	23
Scottish Singles Sales (Official Charts)	6
UK Singles (Official Charts)	4

=== Year-end charts ===
Chart (1998)	Position
UK Singles (OCC)	171

== Certifications ==
Region	Certification	Certified units/sales
Canada (Music Canada)	Gold	40,000^{‡}
Denmark (IFPI Danmark)	Gold	45,000^{‡}
Italy (FIMI)	Gold	25,000^{‡}
New Zealand (RMNZ)	Platinum	30,000^{‡}
United Kingdom (BPI)	2× Platinum	1,200,000^{‡}
^{‡} Sales+streaming figures based on certification alone.

== Covers ==
"No Surprises"

Single by Regina Spektor
- Released: 27 April 2010
- Length: 3:51
- Label: Sire
- Songwriter: Radiohead

Regina Spektor singles chronology
"Eet" (2009)	"No Surprises" (2010)	"All the Rowboats" (2012)

The American singer-songwriter Amanda Palmer included "No Surprises" in EP of Radiohead covers performed on ukulele, Amanda Palmer Performs the Popular Hits of Radiohead on Her Magical Ukulele. Roman GianArthur released OK Lady, an EP of Radiohead R&B covers including "No Surprises" in late 2015. Regina Spektor released a cover of "No Surprises", featuring just her voice and piano, as a single on 27 April 2010. All proceeds go to the charity Doctors Without Borders.

=== Charts ===
Chart (2010)	Peak position
Australia (ARIA)	96
