= MiniDiscs (Hacked) =

MiniDiscs [Hacked]
- Cover of MD111, the first MiniDisc

Compilation album by Radiohead
- Released: 11 June 2019
- Recorded: 1995–1997
- Length: 16:18:52
- Labels: Self-released; distributed via Bandcamp

Radiohead chronology
OK Computer OKNOTOK 1997 2017 (2017)	''MiniDiscs [Hacked]'' (2019)	Kid A Mnesia (2021)

MiniDiscs [Hacked] is a compilation album by the English rock band Radiohead, released in 2019. It comprises more than 16 hours of demos, rehearsals, live performances and other material recorded while Radiohead were working on their 1997 album OK Computer.

The recordings were taken from MiniDiscs belonging to the singer, Thom Yorke, and were not intended for release. According to some reports, a bootleg collector demanded a ransom from Radiohead. However, the collector denied this, saying he instead planned to sell the recordings to fans. This was corroborated by fans who negotiated with him. After the recordings were leaked online, Radiohead released them through the music sharing site Bandcamp for 18 days, with all proceeds going to the environmentalist group Extinction Rebellion.

The compilation received positive reviews. Though critics said that its size made it daunting for some listeners, they praised the insight into the making of OK Computer.

== Content ==
MiniDiscs [Hacked] contains more than 16 hours of demos, rehearsals, outtakes, and live performances recorded while Radiohead were working on their third album, OK Computer (1997). The recordings were taken from MiniDiscs belonging to the Radiohead singer, Thom Yorke. They include unreleased songs, alternative mixes, early versions of OK Computer songs (such as an extended version of "Paranoid Android"), and versions of the later songs "Lift", "True Love Waits", "Nude", "Last Flowers", "Motion Picture Soundtrack" and "Life in a Glasshouse". "Poison" is an early version of "Exit Music (For a Film)", with different lyrics.

== Release ==
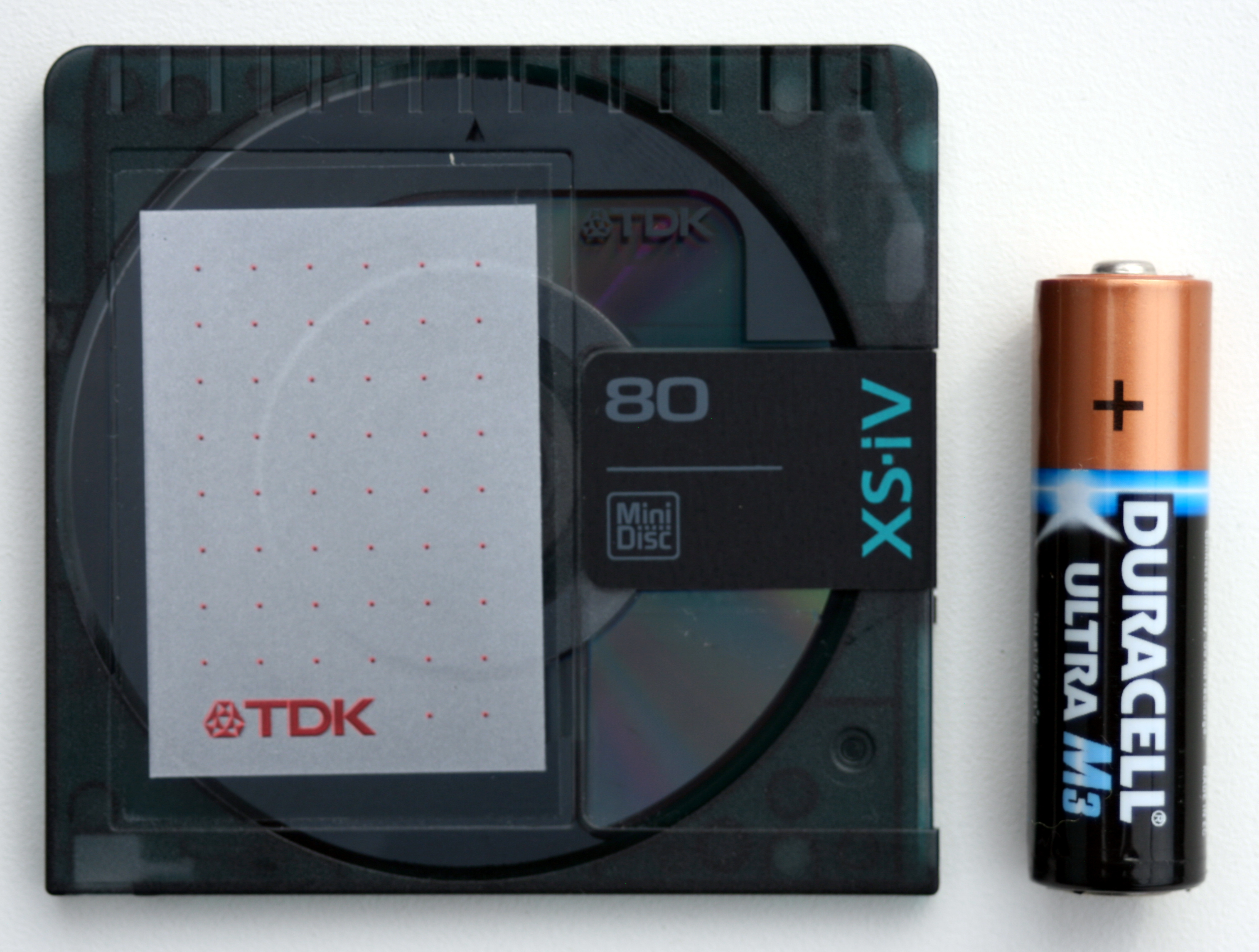
The recordings were taken from MiniDiscs (example pictured with AA battery for scale).

Though some of the recordings had been previously released on the 2017 OK Computer reissue OKNOTOK 1997 2017, most were not intended for release. On 5 June 2019, the recordings were leaked online by a bootleg collector using the name Zimbra, who said he had traded them for unreleased Beatles recordings. They may have been stolen while archived material was being prepared for the OK Computer reissue. The guitarist Ed O'Brien said they had been stolen from Radiohead's cloud archive.

According to some reports, Zimbra initially demanded a $150,000 ransom from Radiohead not to release the recordings. However, according to an investigation by Pitchfork, Zimbra had demanded no ransom and had instead hoped to sell the recordings to fans. Zimbra told Pitchfork that the story had been taken "way out of context". A fan who negotiated with Zimbra said he did not believe extortion was his intent, and that he had said nothing to suggest he was trying to get money from the band. Zimbra released the recordings free after news broke on the discussion platform Reddit.

On 11 June, Radiohead made the recordings available to stream and purchase from the music distribution site Bandcamp for 18 days. All proceeds went to the environmentalist group Extinction Rebellion, raising approximately £500,000. The official release removed a 12-minute field recording and non-Radiohead material, such as several minutes of a James Bond score. The guitarist Jonny Greenwood wrote on Twitter that the collection was "only tangentially interesting", while Yorke wrote on the Bandcamp page: "As it's out there it may as well be out there until we all get bored and move on."

== Reception ==
Professional ratings
Aggregate scores
Source	Rating
Metacritic	82/100
Review scores
Source	Rating
The Guardian	4/5 stars
The Daily Telegraph	4/5 stars

According to the review aggregator Metacritic, MiniDiscs [Hacked] received "universal acclaim" based on a weighted average score of 82 out of 100 from 4 critic scores.

Pitchfork wrote that MiniDiscs [Hacked] did not "make for an ideal listening experience" and would be of interest "only to the most diehard Radiohead fans". They observed a "few moments of brilliance (and strangeness)", including Yorke's acoustic songs, the extended "Paranoid Android", and an alternative version of "Lift" that "could have topped the charts".

However, The Guardian felt MiniDiscs [Hacked] had merit "even for less nerdish fans", and wrote that was "an endlessly interesting chronicle of a band reinventing the mainstream by rejecting it ... [It shows] the inner workings of what is regarded by many as the greatest album of the 1990s, showing how they walked alongside and then turned away from the brash Britpop that surrounded them."

The New Statesman wrote that "starting, skipping and scrolling" through the lengthy tracks "makes for a surprisingly liberating experience, akin to wandering Radiohead's subconscious memory palace and occasionally encountering the familiar in a different form". The Quietus praised the "stunning" live performances and particularly Yorke's demos, and wrote of the "unromantic revealing" of the process of creating music.

== Track listing ==
External document
- MiniDiscs (Hacked) – a fan-made document in Google Docs cataloguing the recordings at the time of the leak

Each MiniDisc is included as a single track lasting approximately an hour; the contents are not broken into individual tracks. Fans assembled a Google document to identify songs and timestamps.

All tracks are written by Radiohead.

No.	Title	Length
1.	"MD111"	1:10:47
2.	"MD112"	1:01:27
3.	"MD113"	1:05:08
4.	"MD114"	57:21
5.	"MD115"	57:04
6.	"MD116"	25:57
7.	"MD117"	55:28
8.	"MD118"	57:03
9.	"MD119"	53:37
10.	"MD120"	58:17
11.	"MD121"	1:00:21
12.	"MD122"	1:13:13
13.	"MD123"	17:52
14.	"MD124"	1:12:22
15.	"MD125"	56:10
16.	"MD126"	1:08:04
17.	"MD127"	26:49
18.	"MD128"	41:52
Total length:		16:18:52
