= Exit Music (For a Film) =

Song by Radiohead

from the album OK Computer
- Released: 21 May 1997
- Genre: Alternative rock; art rock; acoustic rock; film score (Note: This song was written for the 1996 film Romeo + Juliet)
- Length: 4:24
- Label: Parlophone; Capitol
- Songwriters: Thom Yorke; Jonny Greenwood; Ed O'Brien; Colin Greenwood; Philip Selway
- Producers: Nigel Godrich; Radiohead

Licensed audio
- "Exit Music (For a Film)" on YouTube

"Exit Music (For a Film)" is a song by the English rock band Radiohead from their third album, OK Computer (1997). It was written for the 1996 film Romeo + Juliet, and features acoustic guitar, Mellotron choir, drums and fuzz bass. Several critics named "Exit Music" among the best Radiohead songs. It has been covered by acts including The Cinematic Orchestra, the Easy Star All-Stars, Vampire Weekend, Matt Heafy and Kelly Clarkson.

== Composition and lyrics ==
While Radiohead were on tour with Alanis Morissette for their second album, The Bends (1995), the filmmaker Baz Luhrmann commissioned them to write a song for his upcoming film Romeo + Juliet and gave them the final 30 minutes of the film. The singer and songwriter, Thom Yorke, said they began work immediately "when we saw the scene in which Claire Danes holds the Colt .45 against her head".

Initially, Yorke attempted to work lines from Romeo and Juliet into the lyrics, but the final song became a broad summary of the narrative. He said: "I saw the Zeffirelli version when I was 13 and I cried my eyes out, because I couldn't understand why, the morning after they shagged, they didn't just run away. It's a song for two people who should run away before all the bad stuff starts." The title is a double meaning, alluding to the song's use in the film's end credits and the deaths, or "exit", of Romeo and Juliet.

== Recording ==
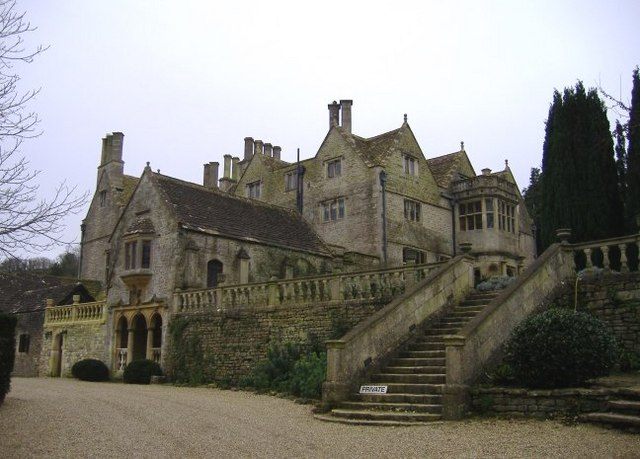
Yorke recorded the vocals for "Exit Music (For a Film)" in a staircase of the St. Catherine's Court manor.

Like several other tracks on their third album, OK Computer, Radiohead recorded "Exit Music" in St Catherine's Court, a manor in Bath, Somerset. The vocals feature natural reverberation achieved by recording on a stone staircase. Yorke likened the opening, which features his singing paired with acoustic guitar, to Johnny Cash's 1968 live album At Folsom Prison. Mellotron choir and other electronic voices are used throughout. The song climaxes with the entrance of drums and distorted bass run through a fuzz pedal. The climax was an attempt to emulate the sound of the trip hop group Portishead, but in a style that the bassist, Colin Greenwood, called more "stilted and leaden and mechanical". The song concludes by fading back to Yorke's voice, acoustic guitar and Mellotron.

Luhrmann said Radiohead were late to finish the song: "We were doing the final mix, where you can no longer put new music in. Just as we were mixing the credits sequence – we had another song in there – suddenly this guy runs into the studio in London, where we were recording, with a tape that said 'From Thom, to Baz, I hope I'm not late'." The song helped shape the direction of OK Computer. Yorke said it "was the first performance we'd ever recorded where every note of it made my head spin—something I was proud of, something I could turn up really, really loud and not wince at any moment".

== Release ==
"Exit Music (For a Film)" was excluded from the Romeo + Juliet soundtrack album, as Radiohead wanted to save it for OK Computer, released on 21 May 1997. An early version, with different lyrics and the title "Poison", was leaked in the 2019 compilation MiniDiscs [Hacked]. It was included as the sixth track on the special edition of Radiohead: The Best Of.

== Reception ==
In Vulture, Mark Hogan named "Exit Music" the 20th-best Radiohead song, writing that "of several Radiohead songs with cinematic titles, this soaring escape fantasy reigns as the surest bet to leave theatregoers with goosebumps". In the Guardian, Jazz Monroe named it the 9th-best, calling it a "high-stakes blockbuster of its own. Yorke has never sounded gloomier, with poisonous murmurs rising to a bloodcurdling fever pitch." In American Songwriter, Jim Beviglia wrote that Radiohead "go for the gusto with a sweeping crescendo" and that "Exit Music" was "Exhibit A for how to do a musical and lyrical slow build".

== Usage in media ==
Besides Romeo + Juliet, the film it was originally composed for, "Exit Music (For a Film)" was also used in some other notable productions. One instance was at the end of the episode "Shut Up and Dance" (2016) from the TV series Black Mirror. A cover of the song from series soundtrack composer Ramin Djawadi was also used during the first season of Westworld (2016).

== Certifications and sales ==
Region	Certification	Certified units/sales
New Zealand (RMNZ)	Platinum	30,000^{‡}
United Kingdom (BPI)	Gold	400,000^{‡}
^{‡} Sales+streaming figures based on certification alone.

== Cover versions ==
In April 2006, the song was covered by the British nu jazz band The Cinematic Orchestra as the title track and closing track for the Radiohead tribute album Exit Music: Songs with Radio Heads. In August 2006, the Jamaician-American reggae band the Easy Star All-Stars released Radiodread, a reggae interpretation of OK Computer, including a version of "Exit Music". The American rock band Vampire Weekend contributed a cover to the 2007 tribute album OKX: A Tribute to OK Computer. In 2017, Japanese-American guitarist Matt Heafy of the American metalcore band Trivium released a cover featuring a black-and-white music video. In 2022, American singer and television personality Kelly Clarkson performed "Exit Music" on her talk show The Kelly Clarkson Show.

== Sources ==
- Caffrey, Dan (2021). Radiohead FAQ: All That's Left to Know About the World's Most Famous Cult Band. Rowman & Littlefield. ISBN 978-1-4930-5397-1.
- Footman, Tim (2007). Welcome to the Machine: OK Computer and the Death of the Classic Album. New Malden: Chrome Dreams. ISBN 978-1-84240-388-4.
- Randall, Mac (2000). Exit Music: The Radiohead Story. New York: Delta Trade Paperbacks. ISBN 0-385-33393-5.
