= I Promise (Radiohead song) =

2017 single

Single by Radiohead

from the album OK Computer OKNOTOK 1997 2017
- Released: 2 June 2017
- Recorded: 1996
- Genre: Alternative rock
- Length: 3:59
- Label: XL
- Songwriter: Radiohead
- Producers: Nigel Godrich; Radiohead

Radiohead singles chronology
"Daydreaming" (2016)	"I Promise" (2017)	"Man of War" (2017)

Music video
- "I Promise" on YouTube

"I Promise" is a song by the English rock band Radiohead, released on the 2017 compilation album OKNOTOK 1997 2017. Radiohead recorded it during the sessions for their third album, OK Computer (1997), but felt it was not strong enough to release. In June 2017, "I Promise" was included on OKNOTOK 1997 2017 and released as a download with a music video.

== History ==
Radiohead first performed "I Promise" on 27 March 1996 at the Fillmore in San Francisco, and played it several times that year while touring in support of Alanis Morissette. Bootleg recordings were widely circulated.

Radiohead recorded "I Promise" during the sessions for their third album, OK Computer (1997), but felt it was not strong enough to release. In 1998, the guitarist Ed O’Brien suggested that Radiohead could rerecord "I Promise" for their next album. After the release of their seventh album, In Rainbows (2007), O'Brien said they had abandoned it.

On 23 June 2017, Radiohead released a 20th-anniversary OK Computer reissue, OKNOTOK 1997 2017, featuring "I Promise" and two other new tracks. "I Promise" premiered on BBC Radio 6 on 2 June. The host, Steve Lamacq, said that Radiohead believed it was lost and had been pleased to rediscover it. That day, Radiohead released a music video on their website and made "I Promise" available to download to those who had pre-ordered OKNOTOK.

On tour in June 2017, Radiohead performed "I Promise" for the first time in 21 years. The songwriter, Thom Yorke, told the crowd: "What a bunch of nutters we were, and probably still are ... One of the crazy things we did was not release this song, because we didn't think it was good enough."

== Composition ==
"I Promise" features strummed acoustic guitar, marching band-like drums, and orchestral Mellotron tones. The lyrics have Yorke "listing off vows like a shopping list", with themes common to OK Computer including loneliness, alienation, paranoia and heartache. O'Brien likened it to Roy Orbison, while Yorke likened it to Joy Division. NME described "I Promise" as "Radiohead at their most direct" before they moved into more experimental music, and Marc Hogan of Pitchfork likened it to their 1995 album The Bends.

== Music video ==
The "I Promise" music video was directed by Michal Marczak, who had previously directed a video vignette for Radiohead's ninth album, A Moon Shaped Pool (2016), and the video for "Beautiful People" by Mark Pritchard, featuring Yorke. The video depicts a nighttime bus journey through Warsaw, with one passenger as a detached animatronic head. Robin Hilton of NPR interpreted the video as a reference to the isolation and gruelling schedule Yorke experienced on the OK Computer tour.

== Reception ==
Pitchfork named "I Promise" the week's "Best New Music". The critic Marc Hogan wrote that it did not share the "technological lyrical themes and gloomy production" of OK Computer but was "stunning all the same". He speculated that, had Radiohead released it in 1997, it "might've been inescapable in dorm rooms, at open mic nights, and wherever else sensitive guys with guitars are found".

== Charts ==
Chart (2017)	Peak position
France (SNEP)	136
Iceland (RÚV)	14
Scottish Singles Sales (Official Charts)	78
UK Singles Downloads (Official Charts)	81
US Hot Rock & Alternative Songs (Billboard)	48

== Personnel ==
=== Radiohead ===
- Colin Greenwood
- Jonny Greenwood
- Ed O'Brien
- Philip Selway
- Thom Yorke

=== Additional personnel ===
- Bob Ludwig – mastering
- Stanley Donwood – illustrations
- Nigel Godrich – production, engineering
- Nick Ingman – conducting
- Jim Warren – production, engineering
