= The National Anthem (Radiohead song) =

- Belgium promotional single cover

Song by Radiohead

from the album Kid A
- Released: 2000
- Recorded: 1997–2000
- Genre: Jazz rock; free jazz; art rock; funk
- Length: 5:51
- Label: Parlophone; Capitol
- Songwriter: Radiohead
- Producers: Nigel Godrich; Radiohead

Licensed audio
- "The National Anthem" on YouTube

"The National Anthem" is a song by the English rock band Radiohead, released on their fourth album, Kid A (2000). It is set to a repeating bassline and features horns playing free jazz, influenced by the jazz musician Charles Mingus.

== Recording ==
"The National Anthem"
This song, featuring a horn section improvising over a repetitive bassline, demonstrates the band's increasing influence from jazz during this time period. Yorke cited Charles Mingus as his main inspiration here.

Radiohead's singer and main songwriter, Thom Yorke, wrote the "National Anthem" bassline when he was 16. In late 1997, Radiohead recorded drums and bass for the song, intending to develop it as a B-side for their third album, OK Computer (1997). Instead, they saved it for their next album, Kid A (2000). An early demo of "The National Anthem" was included in the special edition of the 2017 OK Computer reissue OKNOTOK 1997 2017.

Radiohead recorded "The National Anthem" in mid-1999 in Gloucestershire. Yorke played bass, and his vocals were processed with a ring modulator. Jonny Greenwood added ondes Martenot and sounds sampled from radio stations. The guitarist Ed O'Brien said: "It's a very ill-disciplined way of recording ... You're adding things to the stew—as well as rejecting things—and then you come back to the song with fresh ears."

In November 1999, Radiohead recorded a horn section playing free jazz, inspired by the "organised chaos" of the live album The Complete Town Hall Concert by the jazz musician Charles Mingus. Yorke described The Complete Town Hall Concert as "just fucking chaos ... There's this incredible tension and it was the most formative record of the whole time." Yorke and Greenwood directed the musicians to sound like a "traffic jam". According to Yorke, he jumped up and down so much during his conducting that he broke his foot. Yorke said: "The running joke when we were in the studios was, 'Just blow. Just blow, just blow, just blow.'"

== Composition ==
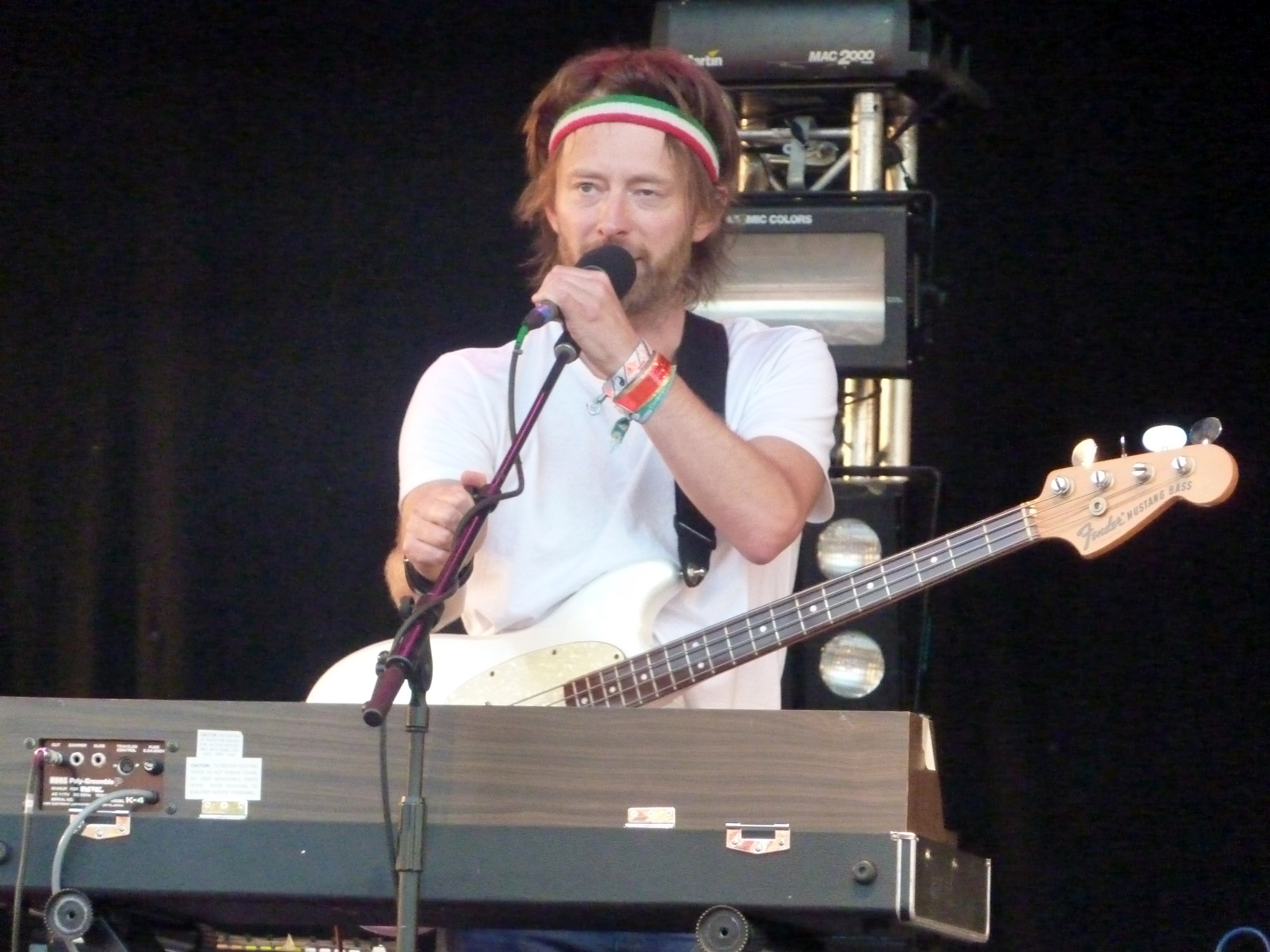
The bass riff of "The National Anthem" was written and performed by Thom Yorke (pictured in 2010)

Yorke said Radiohead tried to convey the feeling of angry people trapped in a lift or traffic. MTV described the free jazz section as "a brass band marching into a brick wall". Simon Reynolds of Spin wrote that it was "a strange, thrilling blast of kosmik highway music" that combined jazz with the Hawkwind song "Silver Machine" and the Can song "Mother Sky". Cam Lindsey of Exclaim! wrote that the song is a "radical jazz-rock fusion". David Fricke of Rolling Stone called it "crusty funk".

== Reception ==
Many critics disliked the jazz elements. In his review of Kid A for the New Yorker, the novelist Nick Hornby described "The National Anthem" as "an unpleasant free-jazz workout, with a discordant horn section squalling over a studiedly crude bass line". Mark Beaumont wrote that the "free-form jazz horns" produced a "Mingus-in-a-tumble-dryer racket". Lorraine Ali, writing for Newsweek, described the song as "annoying pileup of squawking instruments". Rob Sheffield of Rolling Stone said the horn section "was a cornier-than-usual art-rock cliché, trying way too hard for a way-too-obvious gimmick". Yorke described meeting a fan who told him that he could not understand the horns; Yorke concluded that some listeners did not want to hear such an angry sound on a record.

Adam Downer of Sputnikmusic said that "by the end of the song, you're in awe of such a jam session" and named it a "recommended track". Siobhan Kane of The Irish Times wrote that it "distills Radiohead's worldview, with those guitars and Yorke's evocative voice, all intelligence and deep emotion". Cam Lindsey of Exclaim! cited it as the standout track on Kid A. Reviewing the demo released on OKNOTOK 1997 2017, Record Collector wrote that the song "could very easily have resembled the sort of latterday U2 track chosen to soundtrack Goal of the Month reels ... That Radiohead had the self-awareness to sit on it rather than go for the drive-time jugular says so much about their intuitive good taste, and the prolonged success it would bring them." In 2026, Rolling Stone named "The National Anthem" the 5th-greatest rock song of the 21st century so far, describing it as a "tense, alienated art-punk jam that's miles more suited to this freaked-out century than anything Francis Scott Key could come up with".

== Personnel ==
- Jonny Greenwood – ondes Martenot, sampling
- Thom Yorke – vocals, bass guitar

Production

- Nigel Godrich – production, engineering, mixing
- Radiohead – production
- Gerard Navarro – production assistance, additional engineering
- Graeme Stewart – additional engineering

Additional musicians

- Henry Binns – rhythm sampling
- Andy Bush – trumpet
- Andy Hamilton – tenor saxophone
- Steve Hamilton – alto saxophone
- Stan Harrison – baritone saxophone
- Martin Hathaway – alto saxophone
- Liam Kirkman – trombone
- Mike Kearsey – bass trombone
- Mark Lockheart – tenor saxophone
