= Radiohead: The Best Of =

2008 greatest hits album by Radiohead

Greatest hits album by Radiohead
- Released: 2 June 2008
- Length: 75:30; 130:50 (special edition)
- Labels: Parlophone; Capitol
- Producers: Sean Slade; Paul Q. Kolderie; John Leckie; Nigel Godrich; Radiohead

Radiohead chronology
Radiohead Box Set (2007)	Radiohead: The Best Of (2008)	In Rainbows – From the Basement (2008)

Radiohead: The Best Of is a greatest hits album by the English rock band Radiohead. It was released on 2 June 2008 by Parlophone Records in the UK and by Capitol Records in the US, subsidiaries of EMI. It contains songs from Radiohead's first six albums, recorded while they were under contract with EMI. Radiohead had no creative input and were critical of the release.

The Best Of debuted at number four on the UK Albums Chart. It was certified platinum in the UK, Ireland, France, Italy and Spain and gold in Belgium and Poland. While reviewers praised the songs, some felt the compilation was unnecessary, did not suit Radiohead's music and contained too many songs from Radiohead's early albums. In 2016, after Radiohead's back catalogue was transferred to XL Recordings, The Best Of was removed from streaming services.

== Content ==
The Best Of contains tracks from Radiohead's first six albums, recorded under their contract with EMI. The special edition contains a second CD with 13 additional tracks, including the B-side "Talk Show Host" and a performance of "True Love Waits" from I Might Be Wrong: Live Recordings (2001). A DVD compilation with 21 music videos, including nine never before released on DVD, was also released.

== Release ==
In 2007, after Radiohead did not renew their contract, EMI released The Best Of and a box set of Radiohead albums to boost their revenue. Radiohead had no input into the releases and were reportedly "enraged", seeing best-of compilations as typical of artists in decline. The singer, Thom Yorke, said:

There's nothing we can do about it. The work is really public property now anyway... It's a wasted opportunity in that if we'd been behind it, and we wanted to do it, then it might have been good ... And now it's like when you move house – you don't want to peer through the window and see what they've done with the wallpaper because it will only upset you.

The EMI owner, Guy Hands, defended the releases as necessary to boost EMI's revenues, and said that "we don't have a huge amount of reasons to be nice [to Radiohead]". The Best Of debuted at number four on the UK Albums Chart. In 2016, Radiohead's back catalogue was transferred to XL Recordings. The Best Of and the "special editions" of Radiohead albums, issued by EMI in the same year without Radiohead's approval, were removed from streaming services.

== Reception ==
Professional ratings
Review scores
Source	Rating
AllMusic	3.5/5 stars
Pitchfork	(4/10)
The Times	4/5 stars

The IGN critic Todd Gilchrist wrote that The Best Of was "a great buy for a budding Radiohead fan", but otherwise "superfluous", and that Radiohead's music did not suit singles or "other forms of pop digestibility". In The Times, Ben Machell also found it superfluous, but wrote that it was otherwise a "near-perfect compilation". In 2019, NME named The Best Of the 12th-best greatest hits album, writing that it was a "foolproof" collection of Radiohead's 1990s material.

The Pitchfork critic Scott Plagenhoef praised the songs, but felt the compilation was unnecessary as Radiohead did not have a "winding, difficult discography to navigate". He wrote that the standard edition contained too many songs from their 90s albums The Bends and OK Computer, and that the expanded edition missed an opportunity to collect B-sides or rarities. In Consequence of Sound, Alex Young also criticised the lack of later songs and said Radiohead's discography did not suit compilations. However, he felt The Best Of achieved its goal of giving new listeners a starting point.

== Track listing ==
All songs written by Radiohead (Colin Greenwood, Ed O'Brien, Jonny Greenwood, Philip Selway, and Thom Yorke), with "Creep" additionally written by Albert Hammond and Mike Hazlewood, and "Idioteque" additionally written by Arthur Krieger and Paul Lansky.

Disc 1 (Standard edition)
No.	Title	Album	Length
1.	"Just"	The Bends, 1995	3:55
2.	"Paranoid Android"	OK Computer, 1997	6:27
3.	"Karma Police"	OK Computer, 1997	4:25
4.	"Creep"	Pablo Honey, 1993	4:00
5.	"No Surprises"	OK Computer, 1997	3:50
6.	"High and Dry"	The Bends, 1995	4:18
7.	"My Iron Lung"	The Bends, 1995	4:36
8.	"There There"	Hail to the Thief, 2003	5:22
9.	"Lucky"	OK Computer, 1997	4:21
10.	"Optimistic" (edit)	edited version previously unreleased; original from Kid A, 2000	4:53
11.	"Fake Plastic Trees"	The Bends, 1995	4:52
12.	"Idioteque" (edit)	edited version previously unreleased; original from Kid A, 2000	4:35
13.	"2 + 2 = 5"	Hail to the Thief, 2003	3:21
14.	"The Bends"	The Bends, 1995	4:08
15.	"Pyramid Song"	Amnesiac, 2001	4:50
16.	"Street Spirit (Fade Out)"	The Bends, 1995	4:13
17.	"Everything in Its Right Place"	Kid A, 2000	4:13

Note: "Optimistic" (Edit) is only on some releases of the album.

Disc 2 (Special edition)
No.	Title	Album	Length
1.	"Airbag"	OK Computer, 1997	4:44
2.	"I Might Be Wrong"	Amnesiac, 2001	4:54
3.	"Go to Sleep"	Hail to the Thief, 2003	3:21
4.	"Let Down"	OK Computer, 1997	4:59
5.	"Planet Telex"	The Bends, 1995	4:19
6.	"Exit Music (For a Film)"	OK Computer, 1997	4:24
7.	"The National Anthem"	Kid A, 2000	5:51
8.	"Knives Out"	Amnesiac, 2001	4:17
9.	"Talk Show Host"	B-side to "Street Spirit (Fade Out)", 1996	4:41
10.	"You"	Pablo Honey, 1993	3:29
11.	"Anyone Can Play Guitar"	Pablo Honey, 1993	3:37
12.	"How to Disappear Completely"	Kid A, 2000	5:56
13.	"True Love Waits" (live)	I Might Be Wrong: Live Recordings, 2001	5:02

== Charts ==
Chart (2008)	Peak Position
Australian Albums (ARIA)	10
Austrian Albums (Ö3 Austria)	23
Belgian Albums (Ultratop Flanders)	1
Belgian Albums (Ultratop Wallonia)	3
Canadian Albums (Billboard)	10
Danish Albums (Hitlisten)	16
Dutch Albums (Album Top 100)	9
Finnish Albums (Suomen virallinen lista)	35
French Albums (SNEP)	39
German Albums (Offizielle Top 100)	38
Irish Albums (IRMA)	1
Italian Albums (FIMI)	7
New Zealand Albums (RMNZ)	6
Norwegian Albums (VG-lista)	17
Polish Albums (ZPAV)	13
Portuguese Albums (AFP)	3
Scottish Albums (Official Charts)	6
Spanish Albums (Promusicae)	31
Swiss Albums (Schweizer Hitparade)	12
UK Albums (Official Charts)	4
US Billboard 200	26

== Certifications ==
Region	Certification	Certified units/sales
Belgium (BRMA)	Gold	15,000^{*}
France (SNEP)	Platinum	100,000^{*}
Ireland (IRMA)	Platinum	15,000^{^}
Italy (FIMI) sales since 2009	Platinum	60,000^{*}
Poland (ZPAV)	Gold	10,000^{*}
Spain (Promusicae)	Platinum	80,000^{^}
United Kingdom (BPI)	Platinum	300,000^{^}
^{*} Sales figures based on certification alone.^{^} Shipments figures based on certification alone.
