= How to Disappear Completely =

2000 song by Radiohead

- Belgium promotional single cover

Promotional single by Radiohead

from the album Kid A
- A-side: "Idioteque" (double A-side) (Note: US release only.)
- Written: June 1997
- Released: 27 September 2000 (Note: Since the release date of the promotional single is unknown, this is the earliest date the song was released as an album track.)
- Recorded: 1 December 1999 – 4 February 2000
- Studio: Canned Applause (Oxfordshire); Dorchester Abbey (Oxfordshire)
- Genre: Folk rock; post-rock; orchestral
- Length: 5:56 (original version); 6:37 (Evening Session version)
- Label: Parlophone; Capitol; EMI Belgium
- Songwriters: Thom Yorke; Jonny Greenwood; Ed O'Brien; Colin Greenwood; Philip Selway
- Producers: Nigel Godrich; Radiohead

Licensed audio
- "How to Disappear Completely" on YouTube

"How to Disappear Completely" is a song by the English rock band Radiohead from their fourth studio album, Kid A (2000). Produced by the band with producer Nigel Godrich, it was released as a promotional single in the US, Poland, and Belgium.

Radiohead wrote "How to Disappear Completely" in mid-1997 during the tour of their third album, OK Computer (1997). The title is derived from Doug Richmond's 1985 book How to Disappear Completely and Never Be Found. The band first performed the song in 1998, and an early soundcheck rendition appears in their documentary Meeting People Is Easy (1998).

An acoustic-based ballad, "How to Disappear Completely" is characterised by orchestral strings, guitar effects, and ambient influences. Radiohead developed the song through various demo recordings before finalising it at their Oxfordshire studio in early 2000. The following month, the string arrangement—composed by multi-instrumentalist Jonny Greenwood and featuring the ondes Martenot—was recorded by the Orchestra of St John's at a church near the band's studio.

"How to Disappear Completely" was later included on the special edition of Radiohead: The Best Of (2008) and reissued on Kid A Mnesia (2021), which also featured the song's isolated string track. It has been featured in various works, including the TV series Roswell (1999–2002), the feature film Life as a House (2001), and the documentary The Island President (2011), which explores the presidency of Mohamed Nasheed.

== Inspiration and writing ==
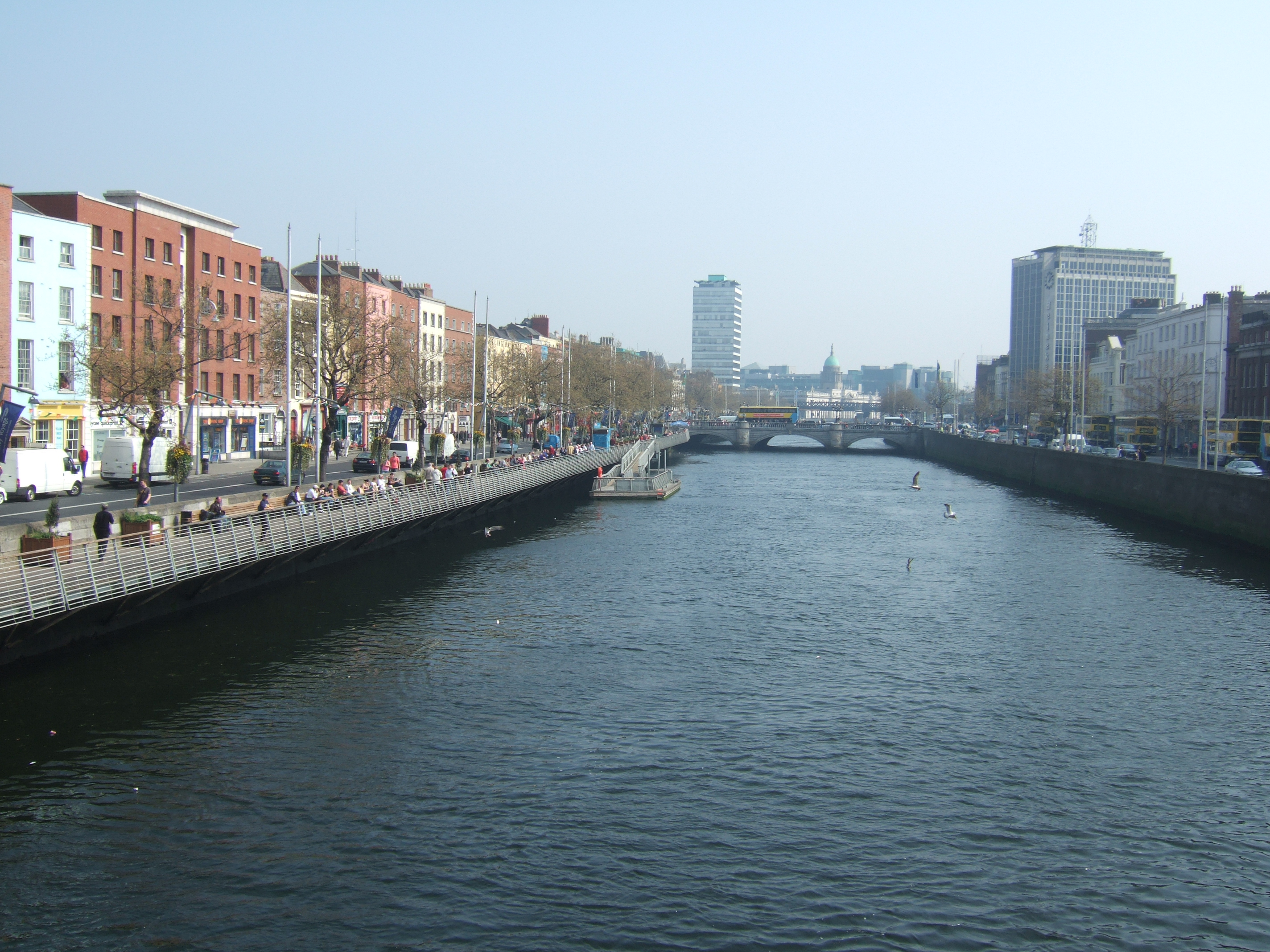
Dublin's River Liffey (pictured in 2007) was one of the sources of inspiration for the song.

One of the earliest songs written for Kid A (2000), "How to Disappear Completely" was primarily written by Radiohead's singer Thom Yorke, though credited to all band members. Yorke began writing it in Toronto, Canada, in June 1997, during the tour for their third album, OK Computer (1997). Later that month, Radiohead performed their largest show to date at the RDS Arena in Dublin, Ireland. The performance took place in windy and rainy conditions. The song was inspired by a dream Yorke had on the night of this show, in which he was running naked down Dublin's River Liffey, pursued by a tidal wave.

According to guitarist Ed O'Brien, "How to Disappear Completely" was inspired by the Dublin show and the stress the band, particularly Yorke, endured on tour. Radiohead's set at the 1997 Glastonbury Festival, which took place a week after the Dublin show, was another inspiration. Following technical difficulties, Yorke nearly abandoned the performance but was encouraged to continue by O'Brien. Yorke later recalled: "I just needed a break. And in fact, I didn't get one for another year and a bit, by which point I was pretty much catatonic."

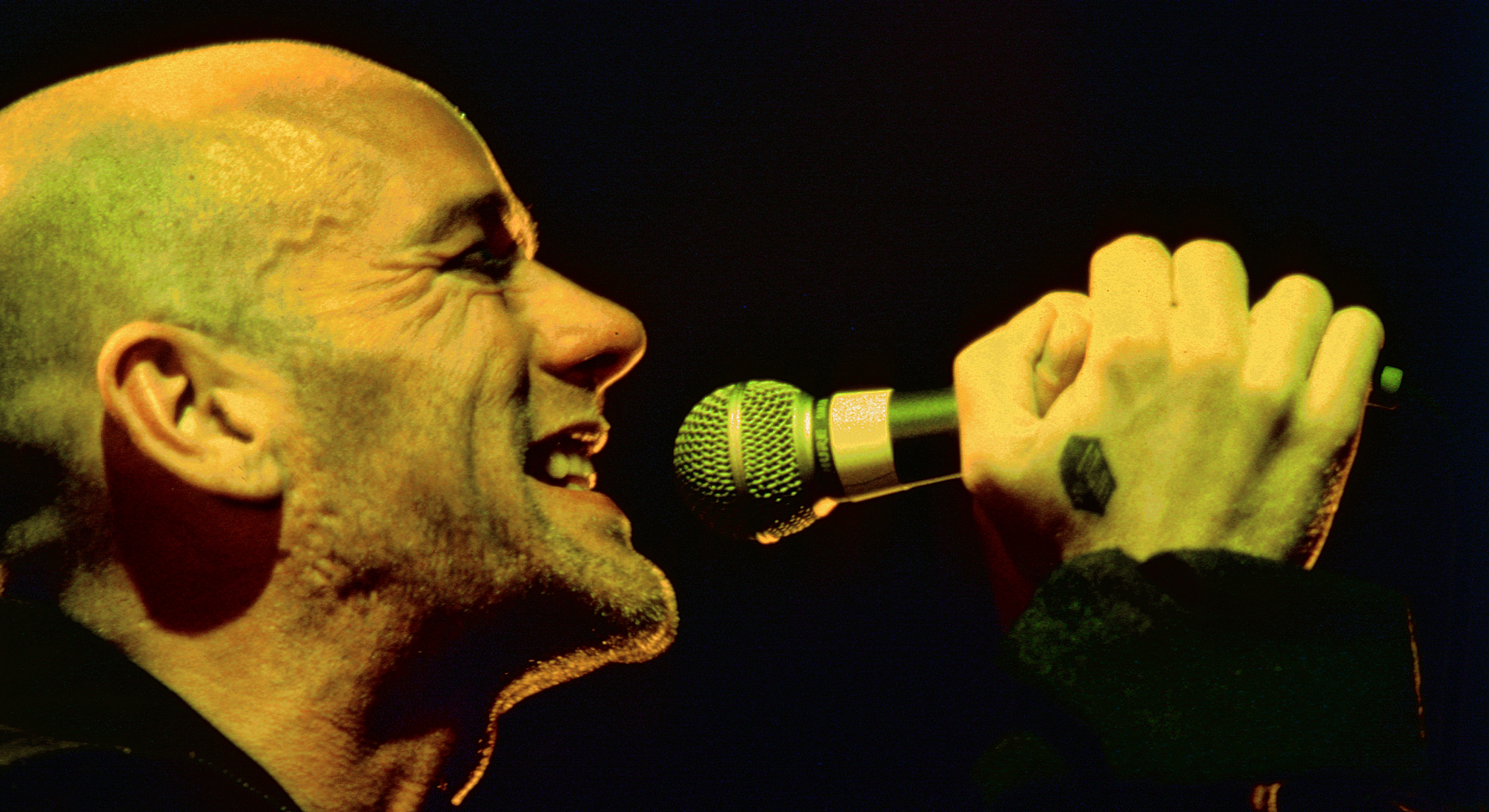
The chorus was inspired by advice given to Thom Yorke by the R.E.M. singer Michael Stipe (pictured in 1999).

In an interview with Terry David Mulligan in Canada in July 1997, Yorke mentioned he had written a song the previous month with the chorus: "I'm not here / This isn't happening." The phrase was advice given to him by his friend, R.E.M. singer Michael Stipe, as a means of coping with tour stress. In turn, "How to Disappear Completely" inspired Stipe to write "Disappear" for R.E.M.'s album Reveal (2001). When Stipe later called Yorke to apologise for stealing the concept, Yorke reassured him that Stipe had originally inspired his song.

In late August 1997, Yorke performed an early acoustic version during a soundcheck in New York; footage from this performance appears in the 1998 documentary Meeting People Is Easy. Radiohead played further versions during the OK Computer tour in 1998, some reportedly lasting between seven and ten minutes; the final studio version runs for six minutes. In a 1998 review, Melody Maker likened one rendition to Radiohead covering Unbelievable Truth, an acoustic band led by Yorke's younger brother, Andy.

Yorke initially introduced "How to Disappear Completely" "for the benefit of the bootleggers". He cited Talking Heads' "Once in a Lifetime" (1980) as a reference for writing the song. It had the working titles "This Is Not Happening" and "How to Disappear Completely and Never Be Found". The latter was taken from Doug Richmond's 1985 book, which details methods of erasing one's identity and assuming a new one, with a particular focus on "taking a French exit". According to some accounts, the song was dedicated to Manic Street Preachers' guitarist Richey Edwards, who disappeared in February 1995 and was declared dead in November 2008.

== Recording ==
Following the OK Computer tour, Yorke experienced writer's block and struggled to complete new songs on guitar. However, "How to Disappear Completely" was largely written before the Kid A and Amnesiac sessions. In early 1999, Radiohead attempted to record a version at Guillaume Tell Studios in Paris, but Yorke dismissed it, saying: "That sounds great, but it sounds like old Radiohead." On 27 July, during their sessions at the Batsford Park mansion in Gloucestershire, they recorded a new demo. In September, O'Brien refuted a rumour in his online diary that Radiohead was collaborating with Canadian post-rock band Godspeed You! Black Emperor on the song.

Within the same month, Radiohead moved to their new mobile studio, Canned Applause, in Sutton Courtenay, Oxfordshire. On 1 December 1999, Radiohead recorded Philip Selway's drum parts in preparation for a collaboration with the Orchestra of St John's, which they chose due to its performances of works by composers Krzysztof Penderecki and Olivier Messiaen. After recording this demo, Yorke had little further involvement, (Note: O'Brien noted in his online diary that Yorke re-recorded his vocals in late January 2000, while Alison Atkinson confirmed that Yorke attended and participated in discussions during the orchestral session.) stating that multi-instrumentalist Jonny Greenwood completed the song alone.

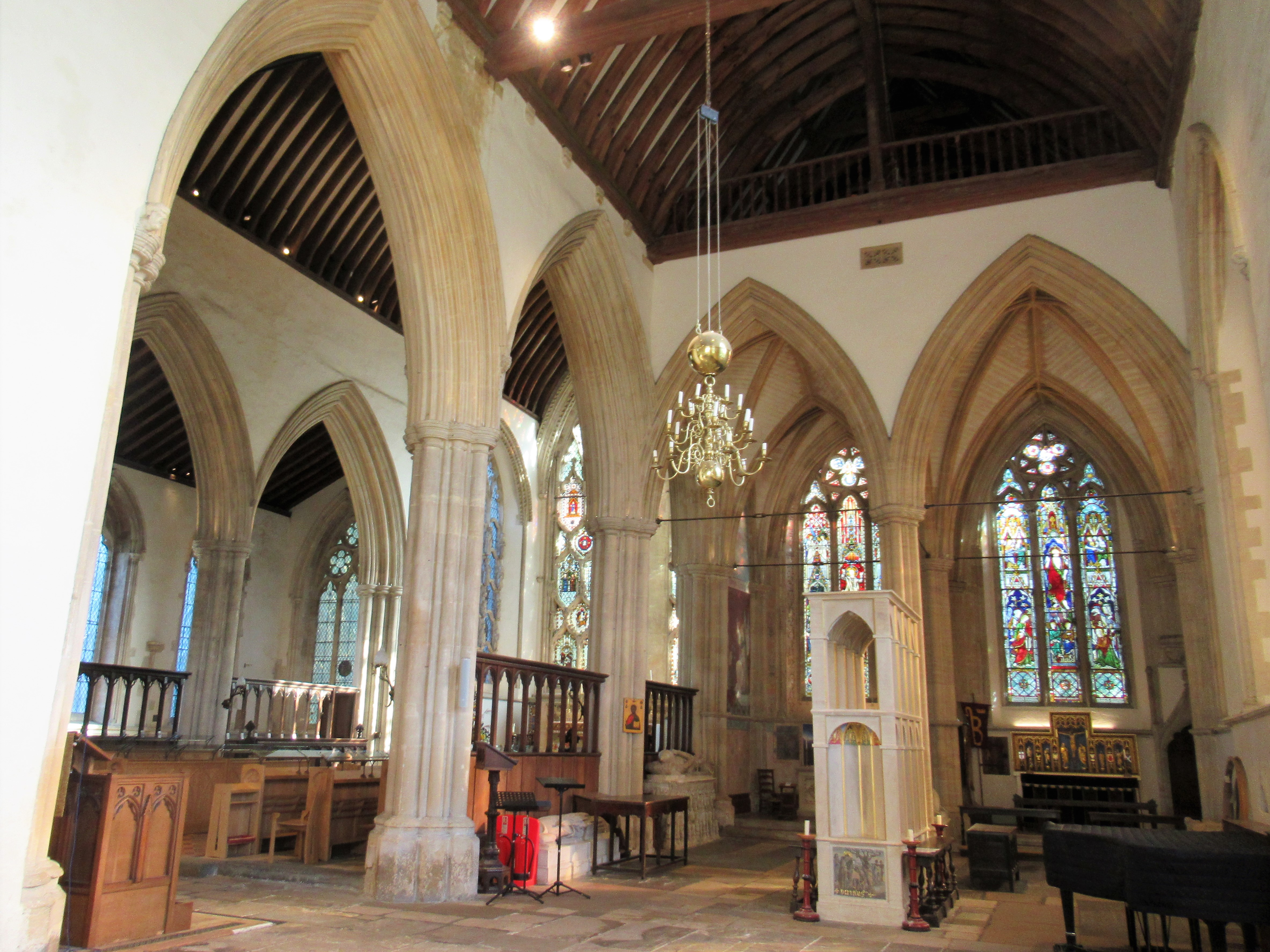
The strings were recorded in Dorchester Abbey, Oxfordshire.

Initially, the 1998 early version was more guitar-driven, but Radiohead opted for a new arrangement, replacing the rock-oriented instrumentation with an "extensive" string section. On 2 December 1999, with the assistance of producer Nigel Godrich, Greenwood, the only band member formally trained in music theory, began composing the string arrangement. He multi-tracked his ondes Martenot, inspired by Messiaen, who popularised the instrument, and completed the arrangement over the following month.

On 4 February 2000, Radiohead booked a three-hour session at Dorchester Abbey, a 12th-century church about five miles from their studio, where the Orchestra of St John's, conducted by John Lubbock, recorded the strings. (Note: During the same session, strings were also recorded for the Amnesiac tracks: "Pyramid Song" and "Dollars and Cents" (2001).) The orchestration was influenced by Penderecki, another key influence on Greenwood's work. According to Godrich, when Greenwood presented his score, the musicians "burst into giggles" as they found it unplayable, at least by conventional standards. However, Lubbock encouraged experimentation, allowing the orchestra to adapt to Greenwood's ideas.

Greenwood noted that the strings were recorded differently from typical rock sessions, avoiding consecutive half or long notes to prevent a "row of balloons" effect. The orchestra's performance, along with Greenwood's ondes Martenot, was captured in a single take using multiple microphones and an Apple G3 computer owned by Godrich. Alison Atkinson, the orchestra's concerts director, described the session as "more experimental" than their usual work. An isolated string track, "How to Disappear into Strings", was later included on the Kid A reissue Kid A Mnesia (2021).

== Composition ==
=== Music ===
"How to Disappear Completely" is an acoustic-driven ballad, underpinned by "forlorn" strings and "compelling" guitar effects, incorporating elements of orchestral and ambient music. Several writers have described it as a ballad, while others have classified it as post-rock. Ryan Pinkard of Tidal Magazine referred to it as a "majestic" pop ballad, while Jazz Monroe of The Guardian categorised it as avant-garde balladry, describing it as a "masterpiece" that "orchestrates a stage-fright reverie with fragments of Robert Wyatt and Penderecki". Stephen Dalton of Uncut called it a "sumptuous" orchestral ballad, whereas Steve Lowe of Q magazine characterised it as a "ghostly waltz-time" folk song, influenced by the Smiths' album Meat Is Murder (1985).

The song is the first on Kid A to feature Yorke's vocals clearly and without processing, unlike the album's preceding tracks: "Everything in Its Right Place", "Kid A", and "The National Anthem". It features strummed acoustic guitar, a Chris Squire-influenced bassline, and a foundation of strings that evolves into "paranoid" electronica and "lush" orchestration, drawing influence from the Moody Blues. It is played in the key of F♯ minor, with a 6/8 time signature and a tempo of 102 beats per minute (BPM). Yorke's vocal range spans from C♯_{3} to A_{4}, delivered in a "long-drawn-out" falsetto. The chord progression follows a sequence of C^{add9}–Em–Em^{6}–G–G^{sus4}–D–D^{add4}–Em^{(maj6)}.

The song opens with a discordant string harmony, followed by Yorke's strummed D ninth chord acoustic guitar, set against B♭ string tuning that creates a dissonance shifting between D major and F♯ minor. O'Brien's use of reverb and delay effects on guitar forms a melody that drifts between the A and E chords. At 0:23, the bassline enters, playing a sequence of F♯–A–B–E–C♯, followed by two separate chords of E and F♯. At 1:37, as the B♭ note resolves, the chorus begins. Throughout, the string arrangement remains closely tied to Yorke's vocals. By the song's conclusion at 5:23, all instruments converge, producing a sustained high-pitched note ranging from A to F♯. Greenwood's ondes Martenot parts are subdued in the mix, owing to the prominence of the string section. Jamie Kahn of Far Out praised the strings for blending seamlessly with the acoustic guitar and Yorke's "haunting" vocals, creating an "eclectic, harmonious" composition.

The string section was inspired by Penderecki's Threnody to the Victims of Hiroshima (1961), which had previously influenced the string section on OK Computer's "Climbing Up the Walls". However, author Peter Carney argued: "It is true that guitarist Jonny Greenwood writes many atonal fragments after Penderecki's style, but structurally, 'How to Disappear Completely' mixes atonal exceptional fragments into tonal architecture." He further suggested that Greenwood's stylistic approach drew more from the jazz of Charles Mingus than from Penderecki.

=== Lyrical interpretation ===
The lyrics explore themes of escape, social alienation, the search for peace, emotional turmoil, and dissociation—often a response to stress or trauma. John Hugar of Uproxx described the song as "about being so miserable you just want to escape into the void, into the nothingness, having never been part of this universe to begin with." The lyrics are poetic and referential, resisting literal interpretation, as seen in the lines: "Strobe lights and blown speakers / Fireworks and hurricanes / I'm not here / This isn't happening". James Oldham of NME wrote that the chorus, "I'm not here / This isn't happening", encapsulates Yorke's mental state and the overwhelming pressures that he and the rest of the band endured during the OK Computer tour.

== Release and media usage ==
"How to Disappear Completely" was released as the fourth track on Radiohead's fourth album, Kid A, on 27 September 2000. The music press speculated that the song might be released as a single due to its commercial potential; however, Radiohead opted not to release any singles from the album. Nevertheless, "How to Disappear Completely" was released in 2000 as a promotional CD single in Poland by Parlophone and in Belgium by EMI Belgium. In the US, it was issued as a double A-side promotional single with "Idioteque" on Capitol Records.

Along with "Idioteque", "How to Disappear Completely" was included on the compilation album 2001: A Sound Odyssey, released in the US in 2000 by Capitol. The song was later featured on the special edition of Radiohead: The Best Of (2008) and the Kid A Mnesia reissue. A live audio version, recorded on 15 November 2000 for BBC Radio 1's Evening Session, was included on the Kid A "Special Collectors Edition" reissue in 2009. A live performance from 2001 was also included on the 2009 DVD disc of "Special Collectors Edition"; this televised performance was recorded on 28 April 2001 in Paris, France, for broadcast on the French TV channel Canal+.

"How to Disappear Completely" was featured in an episode of the American TV series Roswell (1999–2002). The show's music supervisor, Alexandra Patsavas, recalled:

Jason Katims and Ron Moore were keen to get the track for an episode, but Radiohead for television—even great television—seemed so out of reach. It's hard to remember now, but the climate for licensing was different in 2000, and bands were much less apt to say yes. But we tried. I remember sending the scene to Capitol Records and waiting and waiting and following up endlessly. I'll never forget getting the call in my tiny office on Sunset and Cahuenga [Boulevards] overlooking an especially unseemly Jack-in-the-Box parking lot: They had approved.

The song was also featured in the American film Life as a House (2001). In 2004, the Argentine writer Mariana Enríquez published her Spanish-language novel Cómo desaparecer completamente, which was named after the track. Additionally, "How to Disappear Completely" was among several Radiohead songs featured in The Island President, a 2011 documentary about Mohamed Nasheed, then-President of the Maldives.

== Critical reception ==
In a 2000 article published prior to the release of Kid A, Melody Maker's Andre Paine described "How to Disappear Completely" as "several minutes of music that sounds like the Smiths produced by DJ Shadow". Reviewing Kid A in 2000, NME's Keith Cameron noted that the song marked Radiohead's "return to the big ballad template, as massed strings swoon and Yorke's voice soars transcendentally for the first time". Rolling Stone critic David Fricke wrote that the song "moves like an ice floe: cold-blue folk rock with just a faint hint of heartbeat." Brent DiCrescenzo of Pitchfork stated that the song "boil[ed] down [OK Computer tracks] 'Let Down' and 'Karma Police' to their spectral essence", claiming it "comes closest to bridging Yorke's lyrical sentiment to the instrumental effect. [...] The strings melt and weep as the album shifts into its underwater mode."

Billboard described "How to Disappear Completely" as "haunting", noting that "vocalist Thom Yorke is as tortured as ever, proclaiming 'I'm not here/This isn't happening' [...] as if he'd already vanished long ago." Cam Lindsay of Exclaim! characterised the song as "a moody acoustic number" and "the most radio compatible track" on Kid A, comparing it to the OK Computer track "Exit Music (For a Film)". Simon Reynolds of Uncut described the song as a "missing link" between Scott Walker's orchestral compositions and the "swoonily amorphous" ballads on My Bloody Valentine's album Isn't Anything (1988). In an article for The Wire, Reynolds further likened it to a Walker ballad composed by Krzysztof Penderecki.

Tom Coombe of The Morning Call compared the song's "haunting and calming" quality to the sound of the ocean. Author Greg Kot wrote that it evokes a "lost soundtrack" to Alfred Hitchcock's 1958 film Vertigo. Similarly, author Steven Hyden suggested that the song could have appeared on OK Computer had it been produced by Walker. He also drew comparisons between its acoustic guitar, which "slowly builds to an operatic emotional climax", and earlier Radiohead songs such as "Fake Plastic Trees" and "Exit Music".

== Personnel ==
Radiohead

- Thom Yorke – vocals, acoustic guitar
- Jonny Greenwood – ondes Martenot, scoring
- Ed O'Brien
- Colin Greenwood – bass guitar
- Philip Selway – drums

Technical

- Nigel Godrich – production, engineering, mixing
- Radiohead – production
- Gerard Navarro – production assistance, additional engineering
- Graeme Stewart – additional engineering

Cover (Note: The cover work is credited as "Landscapes, Knives and Glue".)

- Stanley Donwood
- Thom Yorke (credited as "Tchock")

Additional musicians

- Orchestra of St John's – strings
  - John Lubbock – conducting
  - Sue Lynn – violin
  - Marjorie Hodge – violin
  - Jeremy Metcalfe – violin
  - Jan Schmolk – violin
  - Jill Samuel – violin
  - Ann Morfee – violin
  - Jonathan Strange – violin
  - Nicolette Brown – violin
  - Eleanor Mathieson – violin
  - Hilary-Jane Parker – violin
  - Kirsten Klingels – violin
  - Caroline Balding – violin
  - Jane Atkins – viola
  - Richard Nelson – viola
  - Esther Geldard – viola
  - Chris Pitsillides – viola
  - John Heley – cello
  - Jo Cole – cello
  - David Bucknall – cello
  - Jonathan Tunnell – cello
  - Tony Hougham – bass
  - Sarah Haynes – bass

== Certification ==
Region	Certification	Certified units/sales
New Zealand (RMNZ)	Gold	15,000^{‡}
^{‡} Sales+streaming figures based on certification alone.

== Notes and references ==
=== Sources ===
- Hale, Jonathan (1999). Radiohead: From a Great Height. Canada: ECW Press. ISBN 1-55022-373-9.
- Paine, Andre (29 March 2000). "New Yorke Stories: On The Trail Of Radiohead". Melody Maker. pp. 22–25.
- Cavanagh, David (October 2000). "I Can See The Monsters". Q. No. 169. pp. 94–104.
- Randall, Mac (2004). Exit Music: The Radiohead Story (2nd ed.). Omnibus Press. ISBN 1-84449-183-8.
- Clarke, Martin (2010). Radiohead: Hysterical and Useless: Revised and Updated (2nd ed.). London, England: Plexus Publishing Limited. ISBN 978-0-85965-439-5.
- Letts, Marianne Tatom (2010). Radiohead and the Resistant Concept Album: How to Disappear Completely. Indiana University Press. ISBN 978-0-253-22272-5.
- Carney, Peter (2016). Radiohead's Subterranean Jazz Structuralism: The Music of Louis Armstrong, Alice Coltrane, Miles Davis, and Charles Mingus in Ten Compositions by Radiohead. Urbana, Illinois: University of Illinois Urbana-Champaign.
- Osborn, Brad (2017). Everything in Its Right Place: Analyzing Radiohead. Oxford University Press. ISBN 978-0-190-62923-6.
- Rose, Phil (2019). Radiohead: Music for a Global Future. London, England: Rowman & Littlefield. ISBN 978-1-44227-930-8.
- Hyden, Steven (2020). This Isn't Happening: Radiohead's Kid A and the Beginning of the 21st Century. New York, US: Hachette Books. ISBN 978-0-30684-569-7.
- Caffrey, Dan (2021). Radiohead FAQ: All That's Left to Know About the World's Most Famous Cult Band. Rowman & Littlefield. ISBN 978-1-4930-5397-1.
