= Pyramid Song =

2001 single by Radiohead

Single by Radiohead

from the album Amnesiac
- Released: 16 May 2001
- Recorded: 1999
- Studio: Medley Studios, Copenhagen
- Genre: Art rock; jazz-rock
- Length: 4:51
- Label: Parlophone; Toshiba-EMI
- Songwriter: Radiohead
- Producers: Nigel Godrich; Radiohead

Radiohead singles chronology
"No Surprises" (1998)	"Pyramid Song" (2001)	"Knives Out" (2001)

Music video
- "Pyramid Song" on YouTube

"Pyramid Song" is a song by the English rock band Radiohead, released as the lead single from their fifth studio album, Amnesiac (2001), in May 2001. It features piano, strings, an unusual rhythm, and lyrics inspired by the Egyptian underworld and ideas of cyclical time.

After no singles were released from their previous album, Kid A (2000), "Pyramid Song" was Radiohead's first single since "No Surprises" (1998). It reached the top 10 on seven national charts, and was named one of the best tracks of the decade by Rolling Stone, NME and Pitchfork. The animated music video, depicting an undersea world, won the 2002 NME Carling Award for best music video.

"Pyramid Song" received acclaim, with several critics citing it as among Radiohead's best work. In 2011, Rolling Stone named it the 94th-best song of the decade.

== Writing ==
Following the tour for Radiohead's third album, OK Computer (1997), the songwriter, Thom Yorke, bought a house in Cornwall. He spent his time walking the cliffs and drawing, restricting his musical activity to playing his new grand piano. He wrote "Pyramid Song" and "Everything In Its Right Place" in the same week. He said: "The chords I'm playing involve lots of black notes. You think you're being really clever playing them but they're really simple." Whereas Yorke transferred his playing to synthesiser for "Everything In Its Right Place", he found "Pyramid Song" sounded better untreated.

"Pyramid Song" was inspired by the song "Freedom" by the jazz musician Charles Mingus, released on the 1962 album The Complete Town Hall Concert. One version of "Pyramid Song" included similar handclaps, but Yorke was unhappy with the sound and erased them. The lyrics were inspired by an exhibition of ancient Egyptian underworld art Yorke attended while Radiohead were recording in Copenhagen, and ideas of cyclical time found in Buddhism and discussed by Stephen Hawking.

The guitarist Jonny Greenwood cited "Pyramid Song" as an example of the challenge of arranging Radiohead songs: "How do we not make it worse, how do we make it better than Thom just playing it by himself, which is already usually quite great?"

== Recording ==
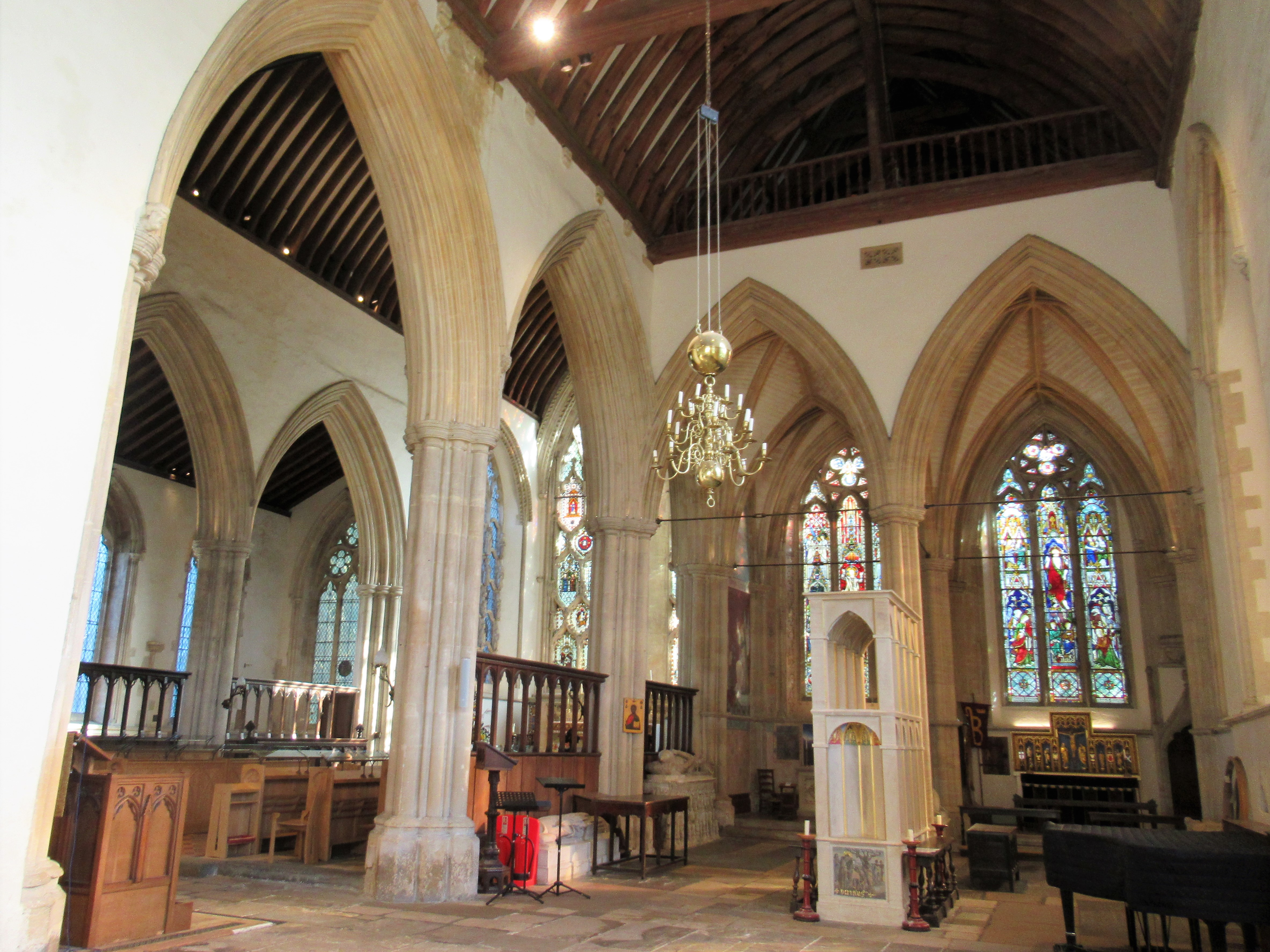
The strings were recorded in Dorchester Abbey, a church in Oxfordshire.

Yorke first performed "Pyramid Song", which had the working title of "Nothing to Fear", at the 1999 Tibetan Freedom Concert in Amsterdam. According to the bassist, Colin Greenwood, Radiohead recorded an "amazing" version on Digital Audio Tape (DAT), but which they could not use due to the limitations of the DAT format. They spent a year trying to recreate it.

The basic track was recorded in Copenhagen early in the sessions for Kid A and Amnesiac. Yorke recorded his vocal and piano at the same time as Philip Selway's drums. Selway initially found it difficult to follow the rhythm and felt the session was going badly. However, the drum part "fell into place" when he stopped trying to analyse the rhythm and instead responded to the inflections in Yorke's piano and vocals.

The strings were performed by the Orchestra of St John's in Dorchester Abbey, a 12th-century church about five miles from Radiohead's studio in Oxfordshire, where Radiohead also recorded strings for another song, "How to Disappear Completely". Greenwood instructed the players to swing in the style of jazz musicians. The isolated string part was included on the 2021 reissue Kid A Mnesia.

== Composition ==
"Pyramid Song"
"Pyramid Song" features strings and an irregular rhythm.

"Pyramid Song" is an art rock song, with elements of jazz, classical and krautrock. According to the journalist Alex Ross, Yorke's piano chords are "laced with suspended tones" and "hang mysteriously in the air, somewhere between serenity and sadness". It features a string section playing glissando harmonics. The rhythm and time signature have been the subject of debate; Selway interpreted it as swung 4/4.

The lines "Jumped in the river and what did I see? / Black-eyed angels swam with me" reference the 19th-century spiritual song "Swing Low, Sweet Chariot" ("I looked over Jordan, and what did I see? / A band of angels, coming after me"). The line "we all went to heaven in a little row boat" also appears in "The Clapping Song" (1965) by Shirley Ellis.

In a 2001 Rolling Stone interview, O'Brien said he felt "Pyramid Song" was Radiohead's best work. Selway said it "ran counter to what had come before in Radiohead in lots of ways ... The constituent parts are all quite simple, but I think the way that they then blend gives real depth to the song."

== Music video ==
The music video for "Pyramid Song" was created by the animation studio Shynola. In the video, a scuba diver explores a sunken city and enters a submerged house. It was inspired by a dream Yorke had. The video won the 2002 NME Carling Award for best music video.

== Reception ==
NME named "Pyramid Song" their "single of the week", describing it as "malevolent, moving, epic". The Guardian critic Alexis Petridis described it as "a beautiful, intricately wrought mesh of complex time signatures, keening vocals, elegiac strings and subtly disturbing audio effects".

In 2011, Rolling Stone named "Pyramid Song" the 94th-best song of the decade, writing that it "might be [Yorke's] most blissful recorded moment". Pitchfork named it the 59th-best, describing it as "an absolutely singular track in a catalog with no shortage of standouts". In the same year, NME named it the 131st-best track of the preceding 15 years, calling it a "ghostly hymn of stunning beauty".

In 2020, the Guardian named "Pyramid Song" the fourth-best Radiohead song, writing: "Lyrics alluding to Hermann Hesse's Siddhartha, piano seemingly exhumed from ancient civilisation and a newly spiritual Yorke, swimming with 'black-eyed angels' and a shoal of exes towards some nebulous afterlife. Torture for some; otherwise, cult-making." In 2025, GQ wrote that "Pyramid Song" could be Radiohead's best song.

In 2026, John Doran wrote in The Quietus that "In form and content, ''Pyramid Song' is an extraordinary track to have hit the British top five, a dissolution of both popular music and of existence itself ... 'Pyramid Song' is rendered transcendent by Yorke's keening vocal, the floating, ghostly sound effects, Selway's astonishing drumming, and the way Jonny Greenwood's 'Egyptian' string arrangement seals these elements like a sarcophagus." He said it was "popular music's most seductive evocation of death" since the 1973 Pink Floyd song "The Great Gig in the Sky".

== Sales ==
"Pyramid Song" was Radiohead's first single after releasing none from their previous album, Kid A (2000). It reached number five on the UK singles chart, number one in Portugal, number two in Canada, number three in Norway, number six in Finland and Italy and number 10 in Ireland. It also reached the top 25 in Australia, France and the Netherlands. On the Eurochart Hot 100, it reached number 13.

== Track listings ==
UK CD1

1. "Pyramid Song" – 4:51
2. "The Amazing Sounds of Orgy" – 3:38
3. "Trans-Atlantic Drawl" – 3:02

UK CD2

1. "Pyramid Song" – 4:51
2. "Fast-Track" – 3:17
3. "Kinetic" – 4:06

UK and French 12-inch single

A1. "Pyramid Song" – 4:51
B1. "Fast-Track" – 3:17
B2. "The Amazing Sounds of Orgy" – 3:38

European maxi-CD single

1. "Pyramid Song" – 4:51
2. "The Amazing Sounds of Orgy" – 3:38
3. "Trans-Atlantic Drawl" – 3:02
4. "Kinetic" – 4:06

Japanese CD single

1. "Pyramid Song" – 4:51
2. "Fast-Track" – 3:19
3. "The Amazing Sounds of Orgy" – 3:38
4. "Trans-Atlantic Drawl" – 3:03
5. "Kinetic" – 4:05

== Personnel ==
Adapted from the Amnesiac liner notes.

Radiohead

- Colin Greenwood
- Jonny Greenwood
- Ed O'Brien
- Philip Selway
- Thom Yorke

Additional musicians

- The Orchestra of St John's – strings
  - John Lubbock – conducting

Technical personnel

- Nigel Godrich – production, engineering
- Radiohead – production
- Gerard Navarro – engineering assistance
- Graeme Stewart – engineering assistance
- Bob Ludwig – mastering

Artwork

- Stanley Donwood – pictures, design
- Thom Yorke (credited as "Tchocky") – pictures

== Charts ==
=== Weekly charts ===
Weekly chart performance for "Pyramid Song"
Chart (2001)	Peak position
Australia (ARIA)	25
Austria (Ö3 Austria Top 40)	57
Belgium (Ultratip Bubbling Under Flanders)	17
Belgium (Ultratip Bubbling Under Wallonia)	12
Canada (Nielsen SoundScan)	2
Europe (Eurochart Hot 100)	13
Finland (Suomen virallinen lista)	6
France (SNEP)	19
Germany (GfK)	98
Ireland (IRMA)	10
Italy (FIMI)	6
Netherlands (Dutch Top 40)	21
Netherlands (Single Top 100)	23
Norway (VG-lista)	3
Portugal (AFP)	1
Scottish Singles Sales (Official Charts)	6
Sweden (Sverigetopplistan)	59
Switzerland (Schweizer Hitparade)	99
UK Singles (Official Charts)	5

=== Year-end charts ===
Year-end chart performance for "Pyramid Song"
Chart (2001)	Position
Canada (Nielsen SoundScan)	5
UK Singles (OCC)	179
Chart (2002)	Position
Canada (Nielsen SoundScan)	89

== Release history ==
Release dates and formats for "Pyramid Song"
Region	Date	Format(s)	Label(s)	Ref.
Japan	16 May 2001	CD	Parlophone; EMI	
United Kingdom	21 May 2001	CD	Parlophone	
Australia	28 May 2001	CD	Parlophone	
