= Orchestra of St John's =

English orchestra

The Orchestra of St John's is an orchestra in the United Kingdom, founded in 1967 by John Lubbock. Originally called the Orchestra of St John's Smith Square, it was originally named after St John's, Smith Square in central London.

The Orchestra has worked with British soloists including Dame Felicity Lott, Tasmin Little, John Lill. Stephen Isserlis and Stephen Kovacevich, and also aims to provide a platform for new musicians, including performers such as Julian Bliss and Chloë Hanslip. It commissions young British composers such as Toby Young.

The Orchestra has held its own music festival each year at Dorchester Abbey in Oxfordshire since 2003, and also promotes concerts in London. These have included a one-hour series of early evening concerts at Cadogan Hall as well as performances at St John's, Smith Square, the South Bank Centre and regular appearances at the BBC Proms. It currently has a residency at SJE Arts, Oxford.

The orchestra has a strong sense of community and visits SEN schools around 80 days each year to perform for the children. Its Serenading Programme also brings live music to patients in hospitals throughout the Oxford area.

Its My Music series started at St John's Smith Square then moved to Wigmore Hall. Celebrities talk about their lives with a soundtrack provided by the orchestra playing their favourite pieces.

The orchestra performed on the albums Kid A (2000) and Amnesiac (2001) by the rock band Radiohead, including the songs "How to Disappear Completely" and "Pyramid Song". The orchestra performed the première of Escape Velocity by Benjamin Wallfisch at the 2006 BBC Proms festival. The composer Matthew King also collaborated with the orchestra and the savant pianist Derek Paravicini on a piano concerto entitled Blue in 2011.
