= Optimistic (Radiohead song) =

2000 promotional single by Radiohead

- European promotional single cover

Promotional single by Radiohead

from the album Kid A
- Written: 1998
- Released: 18 September 2000
- Genre: Alternative rock; art rock
- Length: 4:53 (Single version); 5:16 (Album version)
- Label: Parlophone; Capitol
- Songwriters: Thom Yorke; Jonny Greenwood; Ed O'Brien; Colin Greenwood; Philip Selway
- Producers: Nigel Godrich; Radiohead

Audio
- "Optimistic" on YouTube

"Optimistic" is a song by the English rock band Radiohead from their fourth studio album, Kid A (2000). It was produced by Nigel Godrich and released as a promotional single in the US and Europe, receiving radio play.

== Composition ==
According to the Radiohead singer, Thom Yorke, he and the lead guitarist, Jonny Greenwood, wrote "Optimistic" in 1998 while traveling through a desert. The refrain, "Try the best you can / The best you can is good enough", was an assurance by Yorke's partner, Rachel Owen, when he was frustrated with Radiohead's recording progress. April Clare Welsh of NME interpreted the line, along with "flies are buzzing around my head / vultures circling the dead", as a possible comment on the pressures of fame. The lyrics were described as possibly ironic.

Rob Sheffield of Rolling Stone described "Optimistic" as an "explicit homage" to the 1992 R.E.M. album Automatic for the People, with similar vocal rhythms. In another article, Sheffield likened the hook to Blind Faith. "Optimistic" is the only guitar-driven song on Kid A. Several critics likened it to Radiohead's earlier rock sound, unlike the rest of Kid A.

== Reception ==
In 2017, Consequence of Sound named "Optimistic" the 30th-best Radiohead song. In 2019, Marc Hogan of Vulture said named it the 21st-best, and wrote that it drew attention for its similarity to Radiohead's earlier work: "If the rest of Kid A looked to expand Radiohead listeners' boundaries, 'Optimistic' was the band's way of showing what it could already do within the old ones." In 2020, Chris DeVille of Stereogum wrote that it was probably the most underrated Radiohead song. It was included on Radiohead: The Best Of (2008).

== Charts ==
=== Weekly charts ===
Chart (2000)	Peak position
US Alternative Airplay (Billboard)	10

=== Year-end charts ===
Chart (2000)	Position
US Modern Rock Tracks (Billboard)	78
Chart (2001)	Position
US Modern Rock Tracks (Billboard)	90
