= True Love Waits (song) =

2016 song by Radiohead

Song by Radiohead

from the album A Moon Shaped Pool
- Released: 8 May 2016
- Genre: Ambient; post-rock
- Length: 4:43
- Label: XL
- Songwriter: Radiohead
- Producer: Nigel Godrich

Licensed audio
- "True Love Waits" on YouTube

"True Love Waits" is a song by the English rock band Radiohead, released on their ninth album, A Moon Shaped Pool (2016). Radiohead first performed it in 1995, with the singer, Thom Yorke, on acoustic guitar. Yorke performed it solo on guitar or Rhodes piano several times in the following years, and it became one of Radiohead's best-known unreleased songs. A performance was released on I Might Be Wrong: Live Recordings (2001).

Radiohead and their producer, Nigel Godrich, attempted to record "True Love Waits" several times, experimenting with different styles, but could not settle on an arrangement. Some of these versions were released on the compilations MiniDiscs [Hacked] (2019) and Kid A Mnesia (2021). One version became the foundation of another track, "Pulk/Pull Revolving Doors", on the 2001 album Amnesiac.

In 2016, Radiohead released "True Love Waits" as the closing track on A Moon Shaped Pool, rearranged as a minimal piano ballad. It received positive reviews, with critics naming it among the greatest Radiohead songs, and Pitchfork named it among the greatest songs of the decade. Several critics felt the long wait made the studio version more powerful. Though it was not released as a single, "True Love Waits" entered the French SNEP and US Billboard Hot Rock Songs singles charts.

== History ==
=== 1995–1996: First performances ===
Radiohead first performed "True Love Waits" in December 1995 in Brussels while touring for their second album, The Bends. The songwriter, Thom Yorke, performed it on acoustic guitar accompanied by an "airy" keyboard melody played by Jonny Greenwood. Over the years, "True Love Waits" became a fan favourite and one of Radiohead's best-known unreleased songs, and bootlegs were widely shared.

=== 1996–1997: OK Computer ===
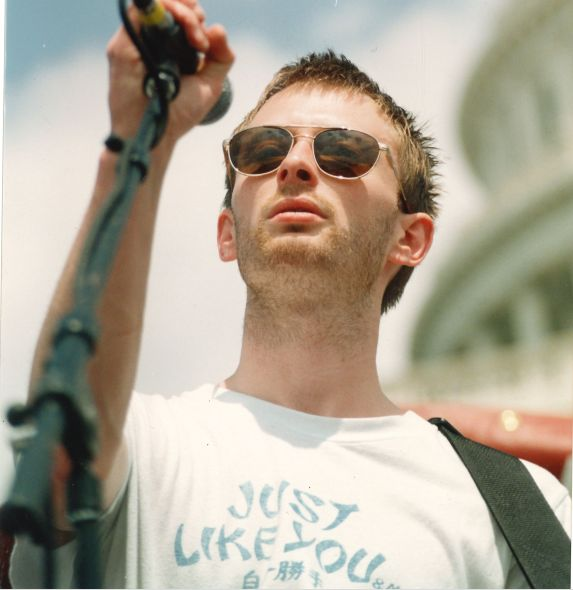
Yorke in 1998

Yorke felt Radiohead had already recorded too many songs based on voice and acoustic guitar, and that recording "True Love Waits" this way would be "too easy". Their producer, Nigel Godrich, said: "To Thom's credit, he needs to feel a song has validation, that it has a reason to exist as a recording." Godrich said they were not interested in recording a version that sounded like John Mayer.

Radiohead worked on "True Love Waits" for their third album, OK Computer (1997), but discarded it. Piano and keyboard tape loops recorded for "True Love Waits" in this period were released on the 2017 reissue OKNOTOK 1997 2017. Other work-in-progress versions were leaked in the 2019 compilation MiniDiscs [Hacked], including a version featuring "spacey" synthesisers and a wah-wah effect. NME described one version as "very 90s", with a strong bassline and progressive rock-style organ.

=== 1999–2001: Kid A and Amnesiac ===
Radiohead worked on "True Love Waits" again during the joint sessions for their albums Kid A (2000) and Amnesiac (2001). In his online diary, the guitarist Ed O'Brien wrote in January 2000 that "True Love Waits" had "been kicking around for about four years now and each time we approached it we seemed to be going down the same old paths. It actually sounds like the start of something exciting now." One month later, he wrote:

This is something like approach number 561 but it is a great song. It's simply trying to find a way of doing it which excites us. And we may have found a way, at the very least we've found a new approach … It may of course be utter crap and we have so lost the plot on this song. Please don't let that be the case.

During this period, Radiohead created an electronic version of "True Love Waits" using the tape loops recorded in the OK Computer sessions, but discarded it. Yorke said later: "We felt like 'True Love Waits' was this wholesome acoustic thing, and then suddenly putting this quite fierce thing... We weren't sure if it was the right thing, so it fell by the wayside." They repurposed pieces of this version as a new track, "Pulk/Pull Revolving Doors", released on Amnesiac. The "True Love Waits" version was released on the 2021 reissue Kid A Mnesia. Rolling Stone described it as "full-on electro-glitch", with "ominous" synthesisers and Rhodes piano.

=== 2001–2016: Further performances ===
During Radiohead's 2001 Amnesiac tour, Yorke performed "True Love Waits" solo several times on acoustic guitar, and a performance was included on I Might Be Wrong: Live Recordings (2001). The journalist Mac Randall wrote that the release demonstrated that Radiohead listened to their fans and were aware of the Radiohead bootleg trade. Godrich later described the version on I Might Be Wrong as "shitty".

Yorke performed "True Love Waits" on several more occasions, including his solo performances at the 2009 Latitude Festival and the Cambridge Corn Exchange in 2010. From 2006, Radiohead began performing a slower version on Rhodes piano as an introduction to another song, "Everything in Its Right Place". According to the Phoenix New Times, "This is a looser, lighter take ... without the clear chord changes and forceful desperation of the acoustic version, one that somehow emphasises the romantic quality of the lyrics rather than the loneliness."

=== 2016: A Moon Shaped Pool ===
In 2016, more than 20 years after it was written, Radiohead released "True Love Waits" as the last track on their ninth album, A Moon Shaped Pool, in a minimal piano arrangement. Radiohead performed this new arrangement on the Moon Shaped Pool tour, until their 2018 leg in South America, when Yorke again performed "True Love Waits" solo on acoustic guitar. Yorke said in 2023: "One of my mistakes is dismissing things because they're simple ... 'True Love Waits' was a bit like that. It was one of those things where it was almost made to be at the end of a show. It wasn't even necessarily made to be recorded. It was made to say, 'OK, guys, goodnight. Thanks.'"

== Composition ==
A clip of a work-in-progress version from the 1990s, released on MiniDiscs [Hacked]

A clip of a version from the Kid A and Amnesiac sessions, later used to create "Pulk/Pull Revolving Doors" from Amnesiac (2001)

A clip of the version released on I Might Be Wrong: Live Recordings (2001), performed on acoustic guitar

The live version of "True Love Waits" released on I Might Be Wrong has Yorke performing alone on acoustic guitar. According to Pitchfork, it features unexpected chord changes and "vehement" guitar strumming. The Phoenix New Times likened the "earnest" and "simple" arrangement to Radiohead songs written in the same era, such as "Fake Plastic Trees".

A clip of the studio version, released on A Moon Shaped Pool (2016), performed on piano

The studio version, released as the final track on A Moon Shaped Pool, was described as "mournful post-rock" and a "deconstructed ambient piano ballad". Instead of guitar, it uses a minimal piano figure over which pianos are gradually overdubbed, creating polyrhythmic loops and textures. Bass enters in the second verse. Chart Attack described it as "slow and melancholy" in the tradition of Radiohead album closers such as "Videotape" from In Rainbows (2007).

According to Yorke, the first verse—"I'll drown my beliefs / To have your babies / I'll dress like your niece / And wash your swollen feet"—addresses the "difference between young and old", when people grow out of childish behaviour; the narrator is offering not to grow up to keep someone they love. The lines "And true love lives / On lollipops and crisps" were inspired by a story Yorke read about a child left alone by his parents for a week who survived by eating snacks. The song has a "pleading" refrain: "Don't leave, don't leave."

== Reception ==
=== Early versions ===
Reviewing I Might Be Wrong: Live Recordings in 2001, Matt LeMay of Pitchfork wrote that Yorke's solo performance of "True Love Waits" was "absolutely gorgeous" and could "hold its own against any song on OK Computer". He felt it justified the release of the live album, alongside the performance of "Like Spinning Plates". Nicholas Taylor of PopMatters described the performance as "a bittersweet victory of love" that "shows that behind all of Radiohead's modernist nightmares is a fragile, desperate desire to connect, fully and meaningfully, with just one person". Ted Kessler of NME praised Yorke's vocals as "clear and true".

Randall felt the rendition on Might Be Wrong was inferior to those of widely shared bootlegs, which featured synthesiser arpeggios and "less whiny" vocals. He wrote: "One gets the feeling that this was a song Radiohead knew they liked and knew audiences liked but the band never came to grips with an arrangement for it; finally they threw up their hands, putting it out as it is." In Pitchfork, Jayson Greene and Jeremy D Larson wrote that the work-in-progress versions of "True Love Waits" released on MiniDiscs [Hacked] did not work and demonstrated why Radiohead had struggled to record the song. The NME critic Elizabeth Audrey found the music in one of these versions too uplifting, and distracted from Yorke's lyrics. In Rolling Stone, Rob Sheffield argued that Radiohead should have released the version they created during the Kid A sessions.

=== Studio version ===
Though the Quietus critic Mike Diver was critical of A Moon Shaped Pool, he praised its version of "True Love Waits" as Radiohead's most affecting song since their 2008 single "Nude". The New Republic writer Ryan Kearney was also critical of A Moon Shaped Pool, but wrote that it was "no coincidence that the only moving song on the album, 'True Love Waits', was written two decades ago".

Steve Jozef of the Phoenix New Times felt the piano arrangement captured the best elements of Yorke's live performances, saving it from sentimentality, and was the album's "most straightforward, unpretentious and emotionally raw composition". He speculated that it was influenced by Yorke's recent separation from his partner of almost 25 years, Rachel Owen. Whereas the early guitar arrangement has a "hopeful, proud character", the Moon Shaped Pool version sounds "resigned, isolated, lost". The Rolling Stone critic Andy Beta wrote that "the effect is like stumbling upon an old love letter years after a relationship has grown cold", and that whereas the "don't leave" refrain once suggested redemption, it now sounded like a goodbye. The NPR critic Mike Katzif called it "a stunning and moving final statement for an album that so masterfully blends politics and personal tragedy".

In the Guardian, Jazz Monroe wrote: "Even when they're not facing the abyss, Radiohead songs tend to operate in its general vicinity, albeit without revealing what led there. But 'True Love Waits' ... conceals nothing: the abyss, listener, is love." The NME writer Damian Jones said it was Radiohead's saddest song. In The Arizona Republic, Ed Masley wrote that the new arrangement "heightens the sense of desperate yearning in Yorke's vocal as he begs his lover not to leave". The GQ critic Jake Woolf found the studio version disappointing, with "mushy piano that weighs the song down emotionally", and missed the brightness of the guitar version. In Louder Sound, Stephen Dalton found it "weary and defeated, which may be deliberate, but less emotionally engaging". The NPR critic Mike Katzif wrote that it was "just Thom and some middle-school piano noodling, sucking out every ounce of life, wrenching sadness from aimlessness".

Several critics felt the long wait made the studio version more powerful. In Consequence of Sound, Nina Corcoran wrote that it "allowed Radiohead to peel [the] words when riper than ever". Katzif said "the ability to hear Radiohead retrofit an older song methodically over two decades actually makes the band feel refreshingly human". The Vulture journalist Marc Hogan wrote that "the difference between the studio cut and its various predecessors floats over the proceedings like a ghost in the machine". In Pitchfork, Jillian Mapes wrote of the "sense that an older, wiser man" was singing, and that the lyrics were more heartfelt "now that he seems resigned to haunting the afterlife". Another Pitchfork critic, Nathan Reese, wrote: "'True Love Waits' is an elegiac coda to one of Radiohead's most inward-facing albums and a fitting treatment to a song that many already considered a classic. The wait was worth it."

Rolling Stone and Arizona Republic named the studio version of "True Love Waits" the best song of May 2016. Pitchfork named it the week's best new track and the ninth-best song of 2016. In 2017, Consequence of Sound named "True Love Waits" the 12th-greatest Radiohead song. In 2019, Vulture named it the greatest Radiohead song, and Pitchfork named it the 93rd-greatest song of the decade. In 2020, the Guardian named it the 17th-greatest Radiohead song.

== Charts ==
Chart performance for "True Love Waits"
Chart (2016)	Peak position
France (SNEP)	181
US Hot Rock & Alternative Songs (Billboard)	43
