= I Might Be Wrong: Live Recordings =

EP by Radiohead
- Released: 12 November 2001
- Genres: Alternative rock; electronica; experimental rock
- Length: 40:11
- Labels: Parlophone; Capitol

Radiohead chronology
Amnesiac (2001)	I Might Be Wrong: Live Recordings (2001)	Hail to the Thief (2003)

I Might Be Wrong: Live Recordings is a live EP by the English rock band Radiohead, released on 12 November 2001 in the UK by Parlophone and a day later in the US by Capitol Records.

I Might Be Wrong comprises performances of songs from Radiohead's albums Kid A (2000) and Amnesiac (2001), recorded during their 2001 tour. As the songs had been developed through studio experimentation, Radiohead rearranged them for live performance. It also includes an acoustic performance of "True Love Waits", a song Radiohead did not release until their 2016 album A Moon Shaped Pool.

I Might Be Wrong received mainly positive reviews. Critics praised the performances and arrangements, but criticised its brevity and lack of earlier Radiohead songs.

== Content ==
I Might Be Wrong comprises performances of songs from Radiohead's albums Kid A (2000) and Amnesiac (2001), recorded during their 2001 tour. It also includes a performance of "True Love Waits", by the singer, Thom Yorke, on acoustic guitar. Radiohead did not release "True Love Waits" until their 2016 album A Moon Shaped Pool.

As Radiohead had developed Kid A and Amnesiac through studio experimentation, they rearranged the songs to perform them live. For example, the electronic track "Like Spinning Plates" was rearranged as a piano ballad. The guitarist Ed O'Brien said: "You couldn't do Kid A live and be true to the record. You would have to do it like an art installation ... When we played live, we put the human element back into it." The drummer, Philip Selway, said Radiohead "found some new life" in the songs when they came to perform them. Yorke said: "Even with electronics, there is an element of spontaneous performance in using them ... It was the tension between what's human and what's coming from the machines. That was stuff we were getting into, as we learned how to play the songs from Kid A and Amnesiac live."

== Reception ==
Professional ratings
Aggregate scores
Source	Rating
Metacritic	76/100
Review scores
Source	Rating
AllMusic	3/5 stars
The Encyclopedia of Popular Music	3/5 stars
Entertainment.ie	4/5 stars
Entertainment Weekly	B+
Mojo	2/5 stars
NME	4/5 stars
Pitchfork	8.0/10
Q	4/5 stars
Rolling Stone	4/5 stars
Stylus	A−

At Metacritic, which assigns a normalised rating out of 100 to reviews from critics, I Might Be Wrong has an average score of 76 based on 16 reviews, indicating "generally favourable reviews". The Entertainment.ie critic Andrew Lynch wrote: "Unlike most live albums, this one captures some of the excitement of actually being there and gives Radiohead back the human dimension they've recently been in danger of losing." Stephen Thompson of The A.V. Club wrote that it "cast new light" on Kid A and Amnesiac. In Rolling Stone, Jonah Weiner described it as "explosively raw", praising the "twisty, insular" performance of "Idioteque" and Yorke's "beautifully chilling" vocals on "Like Spinning Plates". Matt LeMay of Pitchfork also praised "Like Spinning Plates", saying it showcased Radiohead's "songwriting virtuosity rather than their sonic adventurousness".

LeMay said "True Love Waits" was "absolutely gorgeous" and that it "holds its own" against any on Radiohead's 1997 album OK Computer. He felt it justified the release of the live album, along with "Like Spinning Plates". Ted Kessler of NME praised Yorke's vocals on "True Love Waits" as "clear and true". However, the critic Mac Randall felt Yorke's vocals were "whiny" and that the performance was inferior to a widely shared bootleg. He wrote: "One gets the feeling that this was a song Radiohead knew they liked and knew audiences liked but the band never came to grips with an arrangement for it; finally they threw up their hands, putting it out as it is."

Several critics felt I Might Be Wrong was too short. Thompson found it "marred by characteristically unrevealing packaging and inexplicable brevity". Randall wrote that its brevity made it "something of a letdown", and that the lack of older songs meant it did not capture "anywhere near the scope of a real Radiohead concert". LeMay also criticised the lack of older songs, and said the album had the feeling of a "promotional item" for Kid A and Amnesiac. Sam Samuelson of AllMusic suggested it could instead have been packaged with Amnesiac as a complete package from the Kid A sessions rather than a "couple of thrown-together releases".

== Reissues ==
Radiohead left EMI after their contract ended in 2003. In 2007, EMI released Radiohead Box Set, a compilation of albums recorded while Radiohead were signed to EMI, including I Might Be Wrong. Radiohead had no input into the reissues and the music was not remastered.

In February 2013, Parlophone was bought by Warner Music Group (WMG). In April 2016, as a result of an agreement with the trade group Impala, WMG transferred Radiohead's back catalogue to XL Recordings. The EMI reissues, released without Radiohead's consent, were removed from streaming services. In May 2016, XL reissued Radiohead's back catalogue on vinyl, including I Might Be Wrong.

== Track listing ==
All tracks are written by Radiohead, except where noted.

I Might Be Wrong: Live Recordings track listing
No.	Title	Writer(s)	Length
1.	"The National Anthem"		4:57
2.	"I Might Be Wrong"		4:52
3.	"Morning Bell"		4:14
4.	"Like Spinning Plates"		3:47
5.	"Idioteque"	Arthur Kreiger, Paul Lansky, Radiohead	4:24
6.	"Everything in Its Right Place"		7:42
7.	"Dollars and Cents"		5:13
8.	"True Love Waits"		5:02
Total length:			40:11

== Personnel ==
Adapted from the liner notes.

=== Radiohead ===
- Thom Yorke
- Jonny Greenwood
- Ed O'Brien
- Colin Greenwood
- Philip Selway

=== Production ===
- Jim Warren – engineering and mixing (tracks 1, 4, 6, 8)
- Nigel Godrich and Will Shapland – engineering and mixing (tracks 2, 3, 5, 7)

== Release history ==
Country	Date	Label	Format	Catalogue number
United Kingdom	12 November 2001	Parlophone	LP	12FHEIT 45104
United Kingdom	12 November 2001	Parlophone	CD	CDFHEIT 45104
United States	13 November 2001	Capitol Records	CD	CDP 7243 5 36616 2 5
