= Radiohead Box Set =

2007 compilation of Radiohead albums

Box set by Radiohead
- Released: 10 December 2007
- Recorded: 1992–2003
- Genres: Alternative rock; experimental rock; electronic rock; art rock; electronica
- Length: 334:23
- Labels: Parlophone; Capitol
- Producers: Radiohead; Sean Slade; Paul Q. Kolderie; John Leckie; Nigel Godrich

Radiohead chronology
In Rainbows (2007)	Radiohead Box Set (2007)	Radiohead: The Best Of (2008)

Professional ratings
Review scores
Source	Rating
AllMusic	4/5 stars

Radiohead Box Set is a box set of albums by the English rock band Radiohead, released on 10 December 2007. It collects their first six studio albums and one live album, recorded while Radiohead were signed to EMI. The albums are included on CDs, a USB stick and as a download.

Radiohead had no input into the release. Commentators saw it as retaliation from EMI after Radiohead did not renew their contract with them. The box set reached number 95 on the Canadian Album Chart.

== Contents ==
Radiohead Box Set set contains Radiohead's first six studio albums and one live album, recorded while they were signed to EMI:

- Pablo Honey (1993)
- The Bends (1995)
- OK Computer (1997)
- Kid A (2000)
- Amnesiac (2001)
- I Might Be Wrong: Live Recordings (2001)
- Hail to the Thief (2003)

The box set comprises seven CDs, with each album included in original digipak sleeves, as a download as DRM-free 320 kbit/s MP3 files with digital artwork, and on a 4 GB USB stick as WAV files.

== Release ==
Radiohead's record contract with EMI ended in 2003 with the release of their sixth album, Hail to the Thief. EMI hoped to negotiate a new contract for their seventh album, In Rainbows (2007), but Radiohead instead self-released it on their website and signed to XL Recordings for the retail release.

EMI announced the Radiohead box set days after Radiohead signed to XL, and released it in the same week as the special edition of In Rainbows. Radiohead had no input into the release and were reportedly "incensed". Commentators including the Guardian saw the box set as retaliation for the band choosing not to sign a new contract with EMI. According to a report on Boing Boing, EMI had threatened to release it on the same date as the special edition of In Rainbows if Radiohead did not license the physical release to them. An EMI spokesperson denied this and said that "Radiohead were kept fully updated of our plans". The following June, EMI released Radiohead: The Best Of. The EMI owner, Guy Hands, defended the releases as necessary to boost EMI's revenues, and said that "we don't have a huge amount of reasons to be nice [to Radiohead]".

The box set was promoted on Google Ads with an advert falsely claiming that In Rainbows was included. EMI removed it, saying it was a "data source glitch". A spokesperson for Radiohead said they accepted the advert was a genuine error.
