= Idioteque =

2000 song by Radiohead

- Promotional single cover

Promotional single by Radiohead

from the album Kid A
- Released: 2 October 2000
- Recorded: 31 January – April 2000
- Genre: Electronica; electro-pop; IDM; ambient techno; 2-step garage
- Length: 5:09
- Label: Parlophone; Capitol
- Songwriters: Radiohead; Paul Lansky; Arthur Kreiger
- Producers: Nigel Godrich; Radiohead

Licensed audio
- "Idioteque" on YouTube

"Idioteque" is a song by the English rock band Radiohead, released on their fourth album, Kid A (2000). Radiohead developed it while experimenting with modular synthesisers. It contains samples of two 1970s computer music compositions.

"Idioteque" was named one of the best songs of the decade by Pitchfork and Rolling Stone. Rolling Stone also named it one of the greatest songs of the century so far, and ranked it number 48 on their list of the "500 Greatest Songs of All Time".

A live version appears on the 2001 album I Might Be Wrong: Live Recordings. "Idioteque" was included on Radiohead: The Best Of (2008).

== Recording ==
Radiohead sampled this portion of "Mild und leise", a 1973 computer music composition by Paul Lansky, for "Idioteque".

"Idioteque" began with an electronic rhythm created by Jonny Greenwood. Greenwood created a drum machine using synthesiser modules similar to those available in the 1970s, using components such as filters to create and shape sounds.

Feeling the rhythm "needed chaos", Greenwood experimented with found sounds and sampling. He sampled the four-chord synthesiser phrase from "Mild und leise", a computer music piece by the American composer Paul Lansky. Lansky wrote "Mild und leise" during 1973–74 at Princeton University on an IBM mainframe computer. It was released on the 1976 compilation Electronic Music Winners, which Greenwood discovered in a second-hand record shop while Radiohead were touring the US.

Greenwood wrote to Lansky asking for permission to use the sample. Lansky wrote that he found Radiohead's use of the sample "imaginative and inventive" and that he had himself "sampled" the chord progression by using the Tristan chord. "Idioteque" also briefly samples another composition on Electronic Music Winners, "Short Piece", by Arthur Kreiger, who became a professor of music at Connecticut College.

Greenwood recorded 50 minutes of improvisation and gave it to the singer, Thom Yorke, who took a short sequence and used it to write the song. Yorke said: "Some of it was just 'what?', but then there was this section of about 40 seconds long in the middle of it that was absolute genius, and I just cut that up." He described it as "an attempt to capture that exploding beat sound where you're at the club and the PA's so loud, you know it's doing damage". As with other songs on Kid A, Yorke wrote lyrics by cutting up phrases and drawing them from a hat. In the second chorus, his vocals are rearranged and looped so that he seems to say "the first of the children" in 5/4, creating a grouping dissonance against the original 4/4 chorus.

== Reception ==
The critic Simon Reynolds wrote that "Idioteque" "does for the modern dance what PiL and Joy Division's 'She's Lost Control' did for disco. Call it bleak house or glum 'n' bass, but the track works through the contrast between Yorke's tremulous hyperemotionality and the rigid grid of rhythm." Keith Cameron of NME wrote that despite it being "gauche" in its style of what he called "garage-noir", "Idioteque" was "a nonetheless brilliantly persuasive two-step litany of paranoia, fear and unease. Yorke sings it like he means it."

Tom Ewing of Freaky Trigger dismissed "Idioteque" as "plain awful" and a "piss-poor" imitation of the 1999 Aphex Twin track "Windowlicker", with "Yorke yammering excruciatingly over the top". However, the Rock's Backpages reviewer Barney Hoskyns wrote that while "Idioteque" was arguably too derivative of Aphex Twin, it contributed "something irresistibly powerful to the [Aphex Twin] template". Brent DiCrescenzo of Pitchfork wrote that it "clicks and thuds like Aphex Twin and Bjork's Homogenic, revealing brilliant new frontiers for the 'band'." The Q reviewer Stuart Maconie wrote that listeners expecting a crossover into conventional electronic dance music were surprised by the "whiny, metallic attack" and anxious refrain, resulting in a song that is "about as uplifting as Mandrax".

"Idioteque" was named the eighth-best song of the decade by Pitchfork and the 56th-best by Rolling Stone. In 2018, Rolling Stone ranked it the 33rd-greatest song of the century so far, and in 2025 they named it the eighth-greatest. In 2021 and 2024, Rolling Stone ranked "Idioteque" number 48 on its lists of the "500 Greatest Songs of All Time", describing it as "the foreboding, spellbinding centrepiece of Kid A".

== Personnel ==
Credits adapted from liner notes.

- Jonny Greenwood – modular synthesiser, sampling
- Thom Yorke – vocals
- Nigel Godrich – production, engineering, mixing
- Radiohead – production
- Gerard Navarro – production assistance, additional engineering
- Graeme Stewart – additional engineering
- Chris Blair – mastering

== Other versions ==
Radiohead have regularly performed "Idioteque" live. A performance was included on the 2001 album I Might Be Wrong: Live Recordings. The drummer, Philip Selway, said Radiohead wanted to "give that sense of the electronic in the piece" while performing with live instruments, and that this changed how he approached drum parts.

In July 2010, Amanda Palmer released a cover of "Idioteque" as the first single from her Radiohead covers album. It was National Public Radio's Song of the Day for January 11, 2011. In 2010, Yoav used a loop pedal to perform an acoustic version.
