= Kid A =

2000 studio album by Radiohead

Studio album by Radiohead
- Released: 2 October 2000
- Recorded: 4 January 1999 – 18 April 2000
- Studios: Guillaume Tell, Paris; Medley, Copenhagen; Radiohead studio, Oxfordshire
- Genres: Electronica; post-rock; art rock; experimental rock; ambient
- Length: 49:56
- Labels: Parlophone; Capitol
- Producers: Nigel Godrich; Radiohead

Radiohead chronology
| Airbag / How Am I Driving? (1998) | Kid A (2000) | Amnesiac (2001) |

Kid A is the fourth studio album by the English rock band Radiohead, released on 2 October 2000 by Parlophone. It was recorded with their producer, Nigel Godrich, in Paris, Copenhagen, Gloucestershire and Oxfordshire. Departing from their earlier sound, Radiohead incorporated influences from electronic music, krautrock, jazz and 20th-century classical music, with a wider range of instruments and effects. The singer, Thom Yorke, wrote abstract lyrics, cutting up phrases and assembling them at random.

In a departure from industry practice, Radiohead released no singles and conducted few interviews and photoshoots. Instead, they released short animations and became one of the first major acts to use the internet for promotion. Bootlegs of early performances were shared on filesharing services, and Kid A was leaked before release. In 2000, Radiohead toured Europe in a custom-built tent without corporate sponsors.

Kid A debuted at number one on the UK Albums Chart and became Radiohead's first number-one album on the US Billboard 200. It was certified platinum in the UK, the US, Australia, Canada, France and Japan. Its new sound divided listeners, and some dismissed it as pretentious, derivative or wilfully obscure. However, it was later named one of the greatest albums by numerous publications; Rolling Stone, Pitchfork and The Times ranked it the greatest album of the 2000s, and in 2020 Rolling Stone ranked it number 20 on its updated list of the 500 Greatest Albums of All Time. Kid A won the Grammy Award for Best Alternative Album and was nominated for the Grammy Award for Album of the Year.

Radiohead released a second album of material from the sessions, Amnesiac, in 2001. In 2021, they released Kid A Mnesia, an anniversary reissue compiling Kid A, Amnesiac and previously unreleased material.

== Background ==
Following the critical and commercial success of their 1997 album OK Computer, the members of Radiohead suffered burnout. The songwriter, Thom Yorke, became ill, describing himself as "a complete fucking mess ... completely unhinged". He was troubled by new acts he felt were imitating Radiohead and became hostile to the music media. He told The Observer: "I always used to use music as a way of moving on and dealing with things, and I sort of felt like that the thing that helped me deal with things had been sold to the highest bidder and I was simply doing its bidding. And I couldn't handle that."

Yorke suffered from writer's block and could not finish writing songs on guitar. He became disillusioned with the "mythology" of rock music, feeling the genre had "run its course". He began to listen almost exclusively to the electronic music of artists signed to the record label Warp, such as Aphex Twin and Autechre, and said: "It was refreshing because the music was all structures and had no human voices in it. But I felt just as emotional about it as I'd ever felt about guitar music." He liked the idea of his voice being used as an instrument rather than having a leading role, and wanted to focus on sounds and textures instead of traditional songwriting. Yorke considered changing the band's name, saying he did not "want to be answerable to what we'd done before".

Yorke bought a house in Cornwall and spent his time walking the cliffs and drawing, restricting his musical activity to playing the grand piano he had recently bought. "Everything in Its Right Place" was the first song he wrote. The guitarist Ed O'Brien had hoped Radiohead's fourth album would comprise short, melodic guitar songs, but Yorke said: "There was no chance of the album sounding like that. I'd completely had it with melody. I just wanted rhythm. All melodies to me were pure embarrassment." O'Brien also considered inviting the hip-hop artist Dr. Dre to collaborate on the album, but felt this was far-fetched. The bassist, Colin Greenwood, said other guitar bands were trying to do similar things, and so Radiohead had to change.

== Recording ==
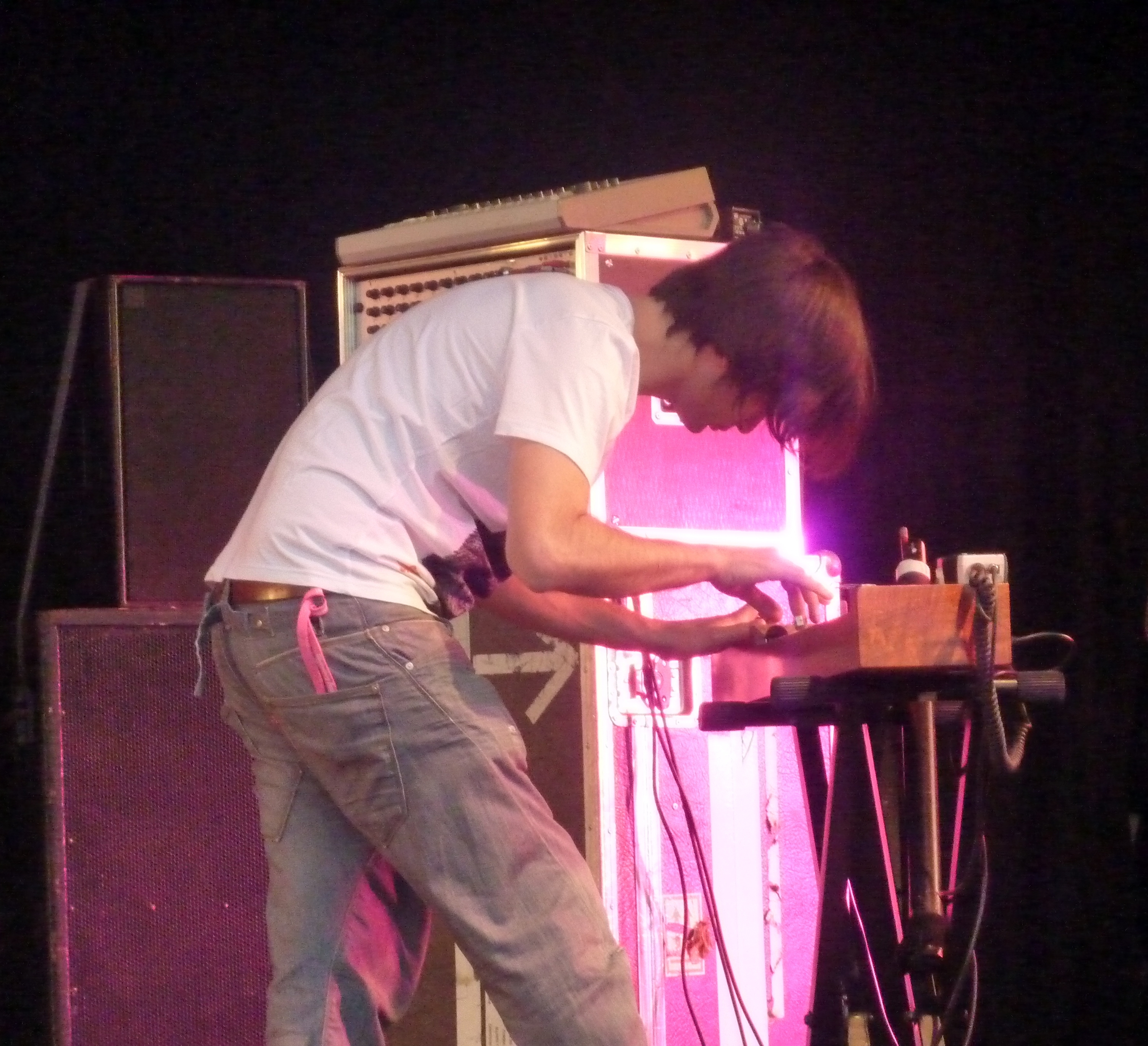
Jonny Greenwood performing on an ondes Martenot in 2010

After the success of OK Computer, Radiohead bought a barn in Oxfordshire and converted it into a recording studio. Yorke planned to use it as the German band Can had used their studio in Cologne, recording everything they played and then editing it. As the studio would not be complete until late 1999, Radiohead began work in Guillaume Tell Studios, Paris, in January 1999.

Radiohead worked with the OK Computer producer, Nigel Godrich, and had no deadline. Yorke, who had the greatest control, was still facing writer's block. His new songs were incomplete, and some consisted of little more than sounds or rhythms; few had clear verses or choruses. Yorke's lack of lyrics created problems, as these had provided points of reference and inspiration for his bandmates in the past.

The group struggled with Yorke's new direction. According to Godrich, Yorke did not communicate much, and according to Yorke, Godrich "didn't understand why, if we had such a strength in one thing, we would want to do something else". The lead guitarist, Jonny Greenwood, feared "awful art-rock nonsense just for its own sake". His brother, Colin, did not enjoy Yorke's Warp influences, finding them "really cold". The other band members were unsure of how to contribute, and considered leaving. O'Brien said: "It's scary – everyone feels insecure. I'm a guitarist and suddenly it's like, well, there are no guitars on this track, or no drums."

Radiohead experimented with electronic instruments including modular synthesisers and the ondes Martenot, an early electronic instrument similar to a theremin, and used software such as Pro Tools and Cubase to edit and manipulate their recordings. Yorke said his lack of knowledge of electronic instruments inspired him, as "everything's a novelty ... I didn't understand how the fuck they worked. I had no idea what ADSR meant." However, Radiohead found it difficult to use electronic instruments collaboratively. According to Yorke, "We had to develop ways of going off into corners and build things on whatever sequencer, synthesiser or piece of machinery we would bring to the equation and then integrate that into the way we would normally work." O'Brien began using sustain units on his guitar, which allow notes to be sustained infinitely, combined with looping and delay effects to create synthesiser-like sounds.

In March, Radiohead moved to Medley Studios in Copenhagen for two weeks, which were unproductive. The sessions produced about 50 reels of tape, each containing 15 minutes of music, with nothing finished. In April, Radiohead resumed recording in a mansion in Batsford Park, Gloucestershire. The lack of deadline and the number of incomplete ideas made it hard to focus, and the group held tense meetings. They agreed to disband if they could not agree on an album worth releasing. In July, O'Brien began keeping an online diary of Radiohead's progress.

Radiohead moved to their newly completed studio in Oxfordshire in September. In November, Radiohead held a live webcast from the studio, featuring a performance of new music and a DJ set. By 2000, six songs were complete. In January, at Godrich's suggestion, Radiohead split into two groups: one would generate a sound or sequence without acoustic instruments such as guitars or drums, and the other would develop it. Though the experiment produced no finished songs, it helped convince O'Brien of the potential of electronic instruments.

On 19 April 2000, Yorke wrote on Radiohead's website that they had finished recording. Having completed over 20 songs, Radiohead considered releasing a double album, but felt the material was too dense, and decided that a series of EPs would be a "copout". Instead, they saved half the songs for their next album, Amnesiac, released the following year. Yorke said Radiohead split the work into two albums because "they cancel each other out as overall finished things. They come from two different places." He observed that deciding the track list was not just a matter of choosing the best songs, as "you can put all the best songs in the world on a record and they'll ruin each other". He cited the later Beatles albums as examples of effective sequencing. Agreeing on the track list created arguments, and O'Brien said the band came close to breaking up: "That felt like it could go either way, it could break ... But we came in the next day and it was resolved." The album was mastered by Chris Blair in Abbey Road Studios, London.

=== Tracks ===
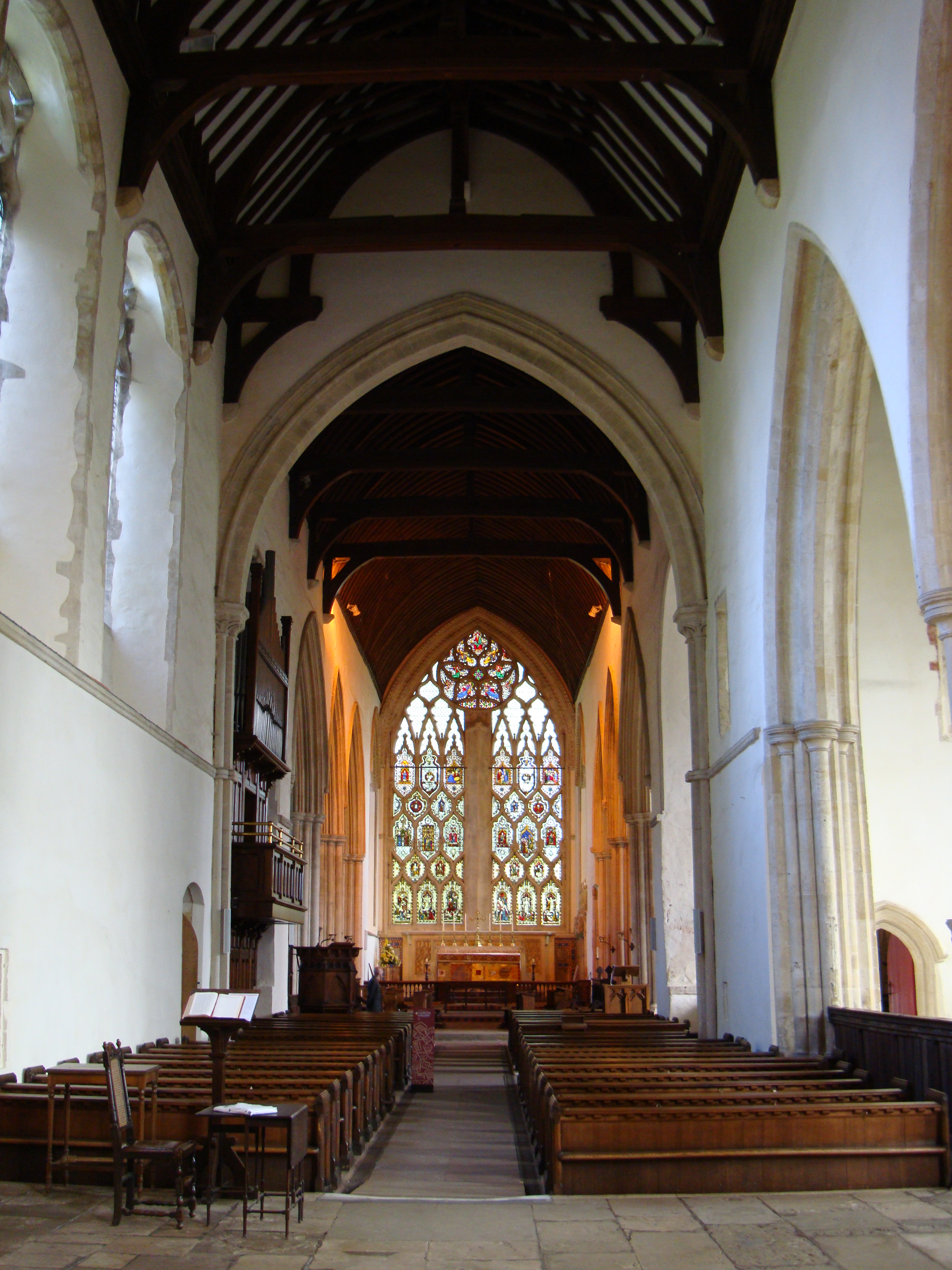
Radiohead recorded the strings for "How to Disappear Completely" in Dorchester Abbey, Oxfordshire.

Radiohead worked on the first track, "Everything in Its Right Place", in a conventional band arrangement in Copenhagen and Paris, but without results. In Gloucestershire, Yorke and Godrich transferred the song to a Prophet-5 synthesiser, and Yorke's vocals were processed in Pro Tools using a scrubbing tool. O'Brien and the drummer, Philip Selway, said the track helped them accept that not every song needed every band member to play on it. O'Brien recalled: "To be genuinely sort of delighted that you'd been working for six months on this record and something great has come out of it, and you haven't contributed to it, is a really liberating feeling." Jonny Greenwood described it as a turning point for the album: "We knew it had to be the first song, and everything just followed after it."

Yorke wrote an early version of "The National Anthem" when the band was still in school. In 1997, Radiohead recorded drums and bass for the song, intending to develop it as a B-side for OK Computer, but decided to keep it for their next album. For Kid A, Greenwood added ondes Martenot and sounds sampled from radio stations, and Yorke's vocals were processed with a ring modulator. In November 1999, Radiohead recorded a brass section inspired by the "organised chaos" of The Complete Town Hall Concert by the jazz musician Charles Mingus, instructing the musicians to sound like a "traffic jam".

The strings on "How to Disappear Completely" were performed by the Orchestra of St John's and recorded in Dorchester Abbey, a 12th-century church about five miles from Radiohead's Oxfordshire studio. Radiohead chose the orchestra as they had performed pieces by Penderecki and Messiaen. Jonny Greenwood, the only Radiohead member trained in music theory, composed the string arrangement by multitracking his ondes Martenot. According to Godrich, when the orchestra members saw Greenwood's score "they all just sort of burst into giggles, because they couldn't do what he'd written, because it was impossible – or impossible for them, anyway". The orchestra leader, John Lubbock, encouraged them to experiment and work with Greenwood's ideas. The concerts director, Alison Atkinson, said the session was more experimental than the orchestra's usual bookings.

Radiohead sampled this portion of "Mild und Leise", a 1973 computer music composition by Paul Lansky, for "Idioteque".

"Idioteque" was built from a drum machine pattern Greenwood created with a modular synthesiser. It incorporates a sample from the electronic composition "Mild und Leise" by Paul Lansky, taken from Electronic Music Winners, a 1976 album of experimental music. Greenwood gave 50 minutes of improvisation to Yorke, who took a short section of it and used it to write the song. Yorke said it was "an attempt to capture that exploding beat sound where you're at the club and the PA's so loud, you know it's doing damage".

"Motion Picture Soundtrack" was written before Radiohead's debut single, "Creep" (1992), and Radiohead recorded a version on piano during the OK Computer sessions. For Kid A, Yorke recorded it on a pedal organ, influenced by the songwriter Tom Waits. Radiohead added harp samples and double bass, attempting to emulate the soundtracks of 1950s Disney films. Radiohead also worked on several songs they did not complete until future albums, including "Nude", "Burn the Witch" and "True Love Waits".

== Music ==
=== Style and influences ===
"Kid A"
The title track demonstrates the electronic processing prominent on Kid A.

"The National Anthem"
"The National Anthem" features a horn section improvising over a repetitive bassline. Yorke cited the jazz musician Charles Mingus as his main inspiration.

Critics identified elements of electronica, post-rock, art pop, experimental rock, ambient, post-prog, and electronic rock. Though guitar is less prominent than on previous Radiohead albums, it was used on most tracks. "Treefingers", an ambient instrumental, was created by digitally processing O'Brien's guitar loops. Many of Yorke's vocals were manipulated with effects; for example, his vocals on the title track were spoken, then vocoded with the ondes Martenot to create the melody.

Kid A incorporates influences from electronic artists on Warp Records such as the 1990s IDM artists Aphex Twin and Autechre; 1970s Krautrock bands such as Can; the jazz of Charles Mingus, Alice Coltrane and Miles Davis; and abstract hip-hop from the Mo'Wax label, including Blackalicious and DJ Krush. Yorke cited Remain in Light (1980) by Talking Heads as a "massive reference point". Björk was another major influence, particularly her 1997 album Homogenic, as was the Beta Band. Radiohead attended an Underworld concert which helped renew their enthusiasm in a difficult moment.

The string orchestration for "How to Disappear Completely" was influenced by the Polish composer Krzysztof Penderecki. Jonny Greenwood's use of the ondes Martenot was inspired by Olivier Messiaen, who popularised the instrument and was one of Greenwood's teenage heroes. Greenwood described his interest in mixing old and new music technology, and during the recording sessions Yorke read Ian MacDonald's Revolution in the Head, which chronicles the Beatles' recordings with George Martin during the 1960s. Radiohead also sought to combine electronic manipulations with jam sessions in the studio, saying their model was the German band Can.

=== Lyrics ===
Yorke's lyrics on Kid A are less personal than on earlier albums, and instead incorporate abstract and surreal themes. He cut up phrases and assembled them at random, combining cliches and banal observations; for example, "Morning Bell" features repeated contrasting lines such as "Where'd you park the car?" and "Cut the kids in half". Yorke described the lyrics as "like shattered bits of mirror ... like pieces of something broken", and said he was not trying to communicate anything specific.

Yorke cited David Byrne's approach to lyrics on Remain in Light as an influence: "When they made that record, they had no real songs, just wrote it all as they went along. Byrne turned up with pages and pages, and just picked stuff up and threw bits in all the time. And that's exactly how I approached Kid A." Radiohead used Yorke's lyrics "like pieces in a collage ... [creating] an artwork out of a lot of different little things". The lyrics are not included in the liner notes, as Radiohead felt they could not be considered independently of the music, and Yorke did not want listeners to focus on them.

Yorke wrote "Everything in Its Right Place" about the depression he experienced on the OK Computer tour, feeling he could not speak. The refrain of "How to Disappear Completely" was inspired by R.E.M. singer Michael Stipe, who advised Yorke to relieve tour stress by repeating to himself: "I'm not here, this isn't happening". The refrain of "Optimistic" ("try the best you can / the best you can is good enough") was an assurance by Yorke's partner, Rachel Owen, when Yorke was frustrated with the band's progress. The title Kid A came from a filename on one of Yorke's sequencers. Yorke said he liked its "non-meaning", saying: "If you call [an album] something specific, it drives the record in a certain way."

== Artwork ==
The Kid A artwork and packaging was created by Yorke with Stanley Donwood, who has worked with Radiohead since their 1994 EP My Iron Lung. Whereas the pair had previously created album artwork through collage, photography and digital manipulation, for Kid A they used paint for the first time. Donwood used canvases measuring six square feet. He painted on them with knives and sticks and used Artex to create textured surfaces, which Yorke photographed and manipulated with Photoshop. Donwood focused on painting, while Yorke focused on digital editing. While working on the artwork, Yorke and Donwood became "obsessed" with the Worldwatch Institute website, which was full of "scary statistics about ice caps melting, and weather patterns changing"; this inspired them to use an image of a mountain range as the cover art. Donwood said he saw the mountains as "some sort of cataclysmic power".

Donwood was inspired by a photograph taken during the Kosovo war depicting a square metre of snow full of the "detritus of war", such as military equipment and cigarette stains. He said: "I was upset by it in a way war had never upset me before. It felt like it was happening in my street." The red swimming pool on the album spine and disc was inspired by the 1988 graphic novel Brought to Light by Alan Moore and Bill Sienkiewicz, in which the number of people killed by state terrorism is measured in swimming pools filled with blood. Donwood said this image "haunted" him during the recording of the album, calling it "a symbol of looming danger and shattered expectations". Yorke and Donwood cited a Paris exhibition of paintings by David Hockney as another influence.

Yorke and Donwood made many versions of the album cover, with different pictures and different titles in different typefaces. Unable to pick one, they taped them to cupboards of the studio kitchen and went to bed. According to Donwood, the choice the next day "was obvious". In October 2021, Yorke and Donwood curated an exhibition of Kid A artwork at Christie's headquarters in London.

== Promotion ==
Phil Selway discussing Kid A in 2000

Kid A's promotional campaign introduced the "Modified Bear" logo, used for later Radiohead marketing and merchandise. (Note: The bear head logo is known as "Modified Bear", "Despot Bear", "Hunting Bear" and "Blinky Bear".)

Radiohead minimised their involvement in promotion for Kid A, conducting few interviews or photoshoots. Though "Optimistic" and promotional copies of other tracks received radio play, Radiohead released no singles from the album. Yorke said this was to avoid the stress of publicity, which he had struggled with on OK Computer, rather than for artistic reasons. He later said he regretted the decision, feeling it meant much of the early judgement of the album came from critics.

Radiohead were careful to present Kid A as a cohesive work rather than a series of separate tracks. Rather than give EMI executives their own copies, they had them listen to the album in its entirety on a bus from Hollywood to Malibu. The Independent journalist Nick Haze said it was "delivered to journalists like Holy Writ". Rob Gordon, the vice president of marketing at Capitol Records, the American subsidiary of Radiohead's label EMI, praised the album but said promoting it would be a "business challenge".

No advance copies of Kid A were circulated, but it was played under controlled conditions for critics and fans. On September 5, 2000, it was played for the public for the first time at the IMAX theatre in Lincoln Square, Manhattan. Promotional copies of Kid A came with stickers prohibiting broadcast before September 19. At midnight, it was played in its entirety by the London radio station Xfm. MTV2, KROQ, and WXRK also played the album.

Rather than agree to a standard magazine photoshoot for Q, Radiohead supplied digitally altered portraits, with their skin smoothed, their irises recoloured, and Yorke's drooping eyelid removed. The Q editor Andrew Harrison described the images as "aggressively weird to the point of taking the piss ... All five of Radiohead had been given the aspect of gawking aliens." Yorke said: "I'd like to see them try to put these pictures on a poster." Q projected the images onto the Houses of Parliament, placed them on posters and billboards in the London Underground and on the Old Street Roundabout, and had them printed on key rings, mugs and mouse mats, to "turn Radiohead back into a product".

=== Videos ===
Instead of releasing traditional music videos for Kid A, Radiohead commissioned dozens of 10-second videos featuring Donwood artwork they called "blips", which were aired on music channels and distributed online. Pitchfork described them as "context-free animated nightmares that radiated mystery", with "arch hints of surveillance". Five of the videos were serviced as exclusives to MTV, and "helped play into the arty mystique that endeared Radiohead to its core audience", according to Billboard. Much of the promotional material featured pointy-toothed bear characters created by Donwood. The bears originated in stories Donwood made for his young children about teddy bears who came to life and ate the "grown-ups" who had abandoned them.

=== Internet ===
Everything in the industry at that point was like, "The internet isn't important. It's not selling records" – everything for them had to translate to a sale. I knew the internet was [generating sales], but I couldn't prove it because every record had MTV and radio with it. [After Kid A was a success], nobody in the industry could believe it because there was no radio and there was no traditional music video. I knew at that point: this is the story of the internet. The internet has done this.

— Capitol executive Robin Sloan Bechtel, 2015

Though Radiohead had experimented with internet promotion for OK Computer in 1997, by 2000 online music promotion was not yet widespread, with record labels still reliant on MTV and radio. Donwood wrote that EMI was not interested in the Radiohead website, and left him and the band to update it with "discursive and random content".

To promote Kid A, Capitol created the "iBlip", a Java applet that could be embedded in fan sites. It allowed users to stream the album, and included artwork, photos and links to order Kid A on Amazon. It was used by more than 1000 sites, and the album was streamed more than 400,000 times. Capitol also streamed Kid A through Amazon, MTV.com and heavy.com, and ran a campaign with the peer-to-peer filesharing service Aimster, allowing users to swap iBlips and Radiohead-branded Aimster skins.

Three weeks before release, Kid A was leaked online and shared on the peer-to-peer service Napster. Asked whether he believed Napster had damaged sales, the Capitol president, Ray Lott, likened the situation to unfounded concern about home taping in the 1980s and said: "I'm trying to sell as many Radiohead albums as possible. If I worried about what Napster would do, I wouldn't sell as many albums." Yorke said Napster "encourages enthusiasm for music in a way that the music industry has long forgotten to do".

The commercial success of Kid A suggested that leaks might not be as damaging as many had assumed. The music journalist Brent DiCrescenzo argued that the Napster leak profoundly affected the way Kid A was received, surprising listeners who would patiently download new tracks to find they comprised "four minutes of ambient noise".

=== Tour ===
Radiohead rearranged the Kid A songs to perform them live. O'Brien said, "You couldn't do Kid A live and be true to the record. You would have to do it like an art installation ... When we played live, we put the human element back into it." Selway said they "found some new life" in the songs when they came to perform them. Yorke said: "Even with electronics, there is an element of spontaneous performance in using them ... It was the tension between what's human and what's coming from the machines. That was stuff we were getting into, as we learned how to play the songs from Kid A and Amnesiac live."

In mid-2000, months before Kid A was released, Radiohead toured the Mediterranean, performing Kid A and Amnesiac songs for the first time. Fans shared concert bootlegs online. Colin Greenwood said: "We played in Barcelona and the next day the entire performance was up on Napster. Three weeks later when we got to play in Israel the audience knew the words to all the new songs and it was wonderful." Later that year, Radiohead toured Europe in a custom-built tent without corporate logos, playing mostly new songs.

Radiohead also performed three concerts in North American theatres, their first in nearly three years. The small venues sold out rapidly, attracting celebrities, and fans camped overnight. Rolling Stone described the Kid A tour as "a revelation" that "exposed rock and roll humanity" in the songs. In October, Radiohead performed on the American TV show Saturday Night Live. The performance shocked viewers expecting rock songs, with Jonny Greenwood playing electronic instruments, the house brass band improvising over "The National Anthem", and Yorke dancing erratically to "Idioteque". Radiohead resumed touring the next year in support of Amnesiac. In November 2001, Radiohead released I Might Be Wrong: Live Recordings, comprising performances from the Kid A and Amnesiac tours.

== Sales ==
Kid A reached number one on Amazon's sales chart, with more than 10,000 pre-orders. It debuted at number one on the UK Albums Chart, selling 55,000 copies in its first day – the biggest first-day sales of the year and more than every other album in the top ten combined. Kid A also debuted at number one on the US Billboard 200, selling more than 207,000 copies in its first week. It was Radiohead's first US top-20 album, and the first US number one in three years for any British act. Kid A also debuted at number one in Canada, where it sold more than 44,000 copies in its first week, and in France, Ireland and New Zealand. European sales slowed on 2 October 2000, the day of release, when EMI recalled 150,000 faulty CDs. By June 2001, Kid A had sold 310,000 copies in the UK, less than a third of OK Computer sales. As of May 2016, it had sold more than 1.5 million digital copies. It is certified platinum in the UK, Australia, Canada, France, Japan and the US.

== Critical reception ==
Contemporary reviews
Aggregate scores
| Source | Rating |
|---|---|
| Metacritic | 80/100 |
Review scores
| Source | Rating |
| Chicago Sun-Times | 3.5/4 stars |
| Entertainment Weekly | B+ |
| The Guardian | 2/5 stars |
| Melody Maker | 1.5/5 stars |
| NME | 7/10 |
| Pitchfork | 10/10 |
| Q | 3/5 stars |
| Rolling Stone | 4/5 stars |
| Spin | 9/10 |
| The Village Voice | A− |

Kid A was widely anticipated. Spin described it as the most anticipated rock record since the 1993 Nirvana album In Utero. According to Andrew Harrison, the editor of Q, journalists expected it to provide more of the "rousing, cathartic, lots-of-guitar, Saturday-night-at-Glastonbury big future rock moments" of OK Computer. Months before its release, Pat Blashill of Melody Maker wrote: "If there's one band that promises to return rock to us, it's Radiohead."

In The Independent, Nick Hasted wrote in 2003 that "Kid A, though nominally well-reviewed, was really reacted to with dismay by most music journalists and many musicians". After it had been played for critics, many bemoaned the lack of guitar, the obscured vocals and the unconventional song structures. Some called it "a commercial suicide note". The Guardian wrote of the "muted electronic hums, pulses and tones", predicting that it would confuse listeners. In Mojo, Jim Irvin wrote that "upon first listen, Kid A is just awful ... Too often it sounds like the fragments that they began the writing process with – a loop, a riff, a mumbled line of text, have been set in concrete and had other, lesser ideas piled on top." The Guardian critic Adam Sweeting wrote that "even listeners raised on krautrock or Ornette Coleman will find Kid A a mystifying experience", and that it pandered to "the worst cliches" about Radiohead's "relentless miserabilism". Some found the free jazz of "The National Anthem" discordant and unpleasant.

Several critics felt Kid A was pretentious or deliberately obscure. The Irish Times bemoaned the lack of conventional song structures and panned the album as "deliberately abstruse, wilfully esoteric and wantonly unfathomable ... The only thing challenging about Kid A is the very real challenge to your attention span." In the New Yorker, the novelist Nick Hornby wrote that it was "morbid proof that this sort of self-indulgence results in a weird kind of anonymity rather than something distinctive and original". The Melody Maker critic Mark Beaumont called it "tubby, ostentatious, self-congratulatory, look-ma-I-can-suck-my-own-cock whiny old rubbish ... About 60 songs were started that no one had a bloody clue how to finish." Alexis Petridis of The Guardian described it as "self-consciously awkward and bloody-minded, the noise made by a band trying so hard to make a 'difficult' album that they felt it beneath them to write any songs". Rolling Stone published a piece mocking Kid A as humourless, derivative and lacking in songs: "Because it was decided that Radiohead were Important and Significant last time around, no one can accept the album as the crackpot art project it so obviously is."

Some critics felt Kid A was unoriginal. In the New York Times, Howard Hampton dismissed Radiohead as a "rock composite" and wrote that Kid A "recycles Pink Floyd's dark-side-of-the-moon solipsism to Me-Decade perfection". Beaumont said Radiohead were "simply ploughing furrows dug by DJ Shadow and Brian Eno before them". The Irish Times felt the ambient elements were inferior to Eno's 1978 album Music For Airports and its "scary" elements inferior to Scott Walker's 1995 album Tilt. Select wrote: "What do they want for sounding like the Aphex Twin circa 1993, a medal?" In an NME editorial, James Oldham wrote that the electronic influences were "mired in compromise", with Radiohead still operating as a rock band, and concluded: "Time will judge it. But right now, Kid A has the ring of a lengthy, over-analysed mistake." The Rolling Stone journalist Rob Sheffield wrote that the "mastery of Warp-style electronic effects" appeared "clumsy and dated". Rob Mitchell, the co-founder of Warp, felt Kid A was not "gratuitously" electronic nor as radical as Warp acts such as Aphex Twin and Autechre, and instead represented an "honest" and "authentic" interpretation of Warp influences. He said it was an "excellent" album that might one day be seen in the same way as David Bowie's 1977 album Low, which alienated some Bowie fans but was later acclaimed.

AllMusic gave Kid A a favourable review, but wrote that it "never is as visionary or stunning as OK Computer, nor does it really repay the intensive time it demands in order for it to sink in". NME was also positive, but described some songs as "meandering" and "anticlimactic", and concluded: "For all its feats of brinkmanship, the patently magnificent construct called Kid A betrays a band playing one-handed just to prove they can, scared to commit itself emotionally." In Rolling Stone, David Fricke called Kid A "a work of deliberately inky, often irritating obsession ... But this is pop, a music of ornery, glistening guile and honest ache, and it will feel good under your skin once you let it get there."

Spin said Kid A was "not the act of career suicide or feat of self-indulgence it will be castigated as", and predicted that fans would recognise it as Radiohead's best and "bravest" album. Billboard described it as "an ocean of unparalleled musical depth" and "the first truly groundbreaking album of the 21st century". Robert Christgau wrote that Kid A was "an imaginative, imitative variation on a pop staple: sadness made pretty". The Village Voice called it "oblique oblique oblique ... Also incredibly beautiful." Brent DiCrescenzo of Pitchfork gave Kid A a perfect score, calling it "cacophonous yet tranquil, experimental yet familiar, foreign yet womb-like, spacious yet visceral, textured yet vaporous, awakening yet dreamlike". He concluded that Radiohead "must be the greatest band alive, if not the best since you know who". One of the first Kid A reviews published online, it helped popularise Pitchfork and became notorious for its "obtuse" writing.

Yorke said Radiohead had not attempted to alienate or confound, but that their musical interests had changed. Jonny Greenwood argued that the tracks were short and melodic, and suggested that "people basically want their hands held through 12 'Mull of Kintyre's". Yorke recalled that Radiohead had been nervous on the Kid A tour, thinking they had been "absolutely trashed", but felt motivated by the "fight to convince people". He said Radiohead felt "incredibly vindicated and happy" after Kid A reached number one in the US.

At Metacritic, which aggregates ratings from critics, Kid A has a score of 80 based on 24 reviews, indicating "generally favourable reviews". It was named one of the year's best albums by publications including the Wire, Record Collector, Spin, NME and the Village Voice. At the 2001 Grammy Awards, Kid A was nominated for Album of the Year and won for Best Alternative Album.

== Legacy ==
Retrospective reviews
Review scores
| Source | Rating |
|---|---|
| AllMusic | 5/5 stars |
| The A.V. Club | A |
| Drowned in Sound | 10/10 |
| The Encyclopedia of Popular Music | 3/5 stars |
| The Great Rock Discography | 9/10 |
| Pitchfork | 10/10 |
| Q | 5/5 stars |
| Record Collector | 5/5 stars |
| The Rolling Stone Album Guide | 5/5 stars |
| Under the Radar | 10/10 |

In later years, Kid A attracted acclaim. The Independent critic Nick Hasted wrote in 2003 that it was "astonishing" and superior to OK Computer. In 2005, Pitchfork wrote that it had "challenged and confounded" Radiohead's audience, and subsequently "transformed into an intellectual symbol of sorts ... Owning it became 'getting it'; getting it became 'anointing it'." In 2015, Sheffield likened Radiohead's change in style to Bob Dylan's controversial move to rock music, writing that critics now hesitated to say they had disliked it at the time. He described Kid A as the "defining moment in the Radiohead legend". In 2016, Billboard argued that Kid A was the first album since Bowie's Low to have moved "rock and electronic music forward in such a mature fashion". In an article for Kid A's 20th anniversary, the Quietus suggested that the negative reviews had been motivated by rockism, the tendency to venerate rock music over other genres.

In a 2011 Guardian article about his negative Melody Maker review, Beaumont wrote that though his opinion had not changed, "Kid A's status as a cultural cornerstone has proved me, if not wrong, then very much in the minority ... People whose opinions I trust claim it to be their favourite album ever." In 2014, Brice Ezell of PopMatters wrote that Kid A is "more fun to think and write about than it is to actually listen to" and a "far less compelling representation of the band's talents than The Bends and OK Computer". In 2016, Dorian Lynskey wrote in The Guardian that Kid A was sometimes dull, with incoherent lyrics, and that Radiohead should have merged it with the best tracks from Amnesiac.

Grantland credited Kid A for pioneering the use of internet to stream and promote music, writing: "For many music fans of a certain age and persuasion, Kid A was the first album experienced primarily via the internet – it's where you went to hear it, read the reviews, and argue about whether it was a masterpiece ... Listen early, form an opinion quickly, state it publicly, and move on to the next big record by the official release date. In that way, Kid A invented modern music culture as we know it." In his 2005 book Killing Yourself to Live, the critic Chuck Klosterman interpreted Kid A as a prediction of the September 11 attacks.

Speaking at Radiohead's induction to the Rock and Roll Hall of Fame 2019, David Byrne of Talking Heads, one of Radiohead's formative influences, said: "What was really weird and very encouraging was that [Kid A] was popular. It was a hit! It proved to me that the artistic risk paid off and music fans sometimes are not stupid." In 2020, Billboard wrote that the success of the "challenging" Kid A established Radiohead as "heavy hitters in the business for the long run". Forbes wrote that whereas previous Radiohead albums had been less cohesive collections of singles, Kid A transformed them into an "album-based band".

=== Accolades ===
In 2020, Rolling Stone ranked Kid A number 20 on its updated "500 Greatest Albums of All Time" list, describing it as "a new, uniquely fearless kind of rock record for a new, increasingly fearful century ... [It] remains one of the more stunning sonic makeovers in music history." In previous versions of the list, Kid A ranked at number 67 (2012) and number 428 (2003). In 2005, Stylus and Pitchfork named Kid A the best album of the previous five years, with Pitchfork calling it "the perfect record for its time: ominous, surreal, and impossibly millennial".

In 2006, Time named Kid A one of the 100 best albums, calling it "the opposite of easy listening, and the weirdest album to ever sell a million copies, but ... also a testament to just how complicated pop music can be". At the end of the decade, Rolling Stone, Pitchfork and the Times ranked Kid A the greatest album of the 2000s. The Guardian ranked it second best, calling it "a jittery premonition of the troubled, disconnected, overloaded decade to come. The sound of today, in other words, a decade early." In 2021, Pitchfork readers voted Kid A the greatest album of the previous 25 years. In 2025, Rolling Stone named it the second-greatest album of the century so far, writing that it "foresaw a darker 21st century, one marked by fear, loneliness, dislocation, and technological advancements that only divide us further ... And 25 years later, there's near-universal sentiment that Kid A is not only a towering achievement by the greatest band of its time, but also a warning call that went completely unheeded."

In 2011, Rolling Stone named "Everything in Its Right Place" the 24th-best song of the 2000s, describing it as "oddness at its most hummable". "Idioteque" was named one of the best songs of the decade by Pitchfork and Rolling Stone, and Rolling Stone ranked it number 33 on its 2018 list of the "greatest songs of the century so far".

Accolades for Kid A
| Publication | Country | Accolade | Year | Rank |
|---|---|---|---|---|
| Consequence of Sound | US | Top 100 Albums Ever | 2010 | 73 |
| Fact | UK | The 100 Best Albums of the 2000s | 2010 | 7 |
| The Guardian | UK | Albums of the decade | 2009 | 2 |
| The Guardian | UK | The 100 Best Albums of the 21st Century | 2019 | 16 |
| Mojo | UK | The 100 Greatest Albums of Our Lifetime 1993–2006 | 2006 | 7 |
| NME | UK | The 100 Greatest British Albums Ever | 2006 | 65 |
| NME | UK | The Top 100 Greatest Albums of the Decade | 2009 | 14 |
| Paste | US | The 50 Best Albums Of The Decade | 2010 | 4 |
| Pitchfork | US | Top 200 Albums of the 2000s | 2009 | 1 |
| Platendraaier | The Netherlands | Top 30 Albums of the 2000s | 2015 | 7 |
| PopMatters | UK/US | The 100 Best Albums of the 2000s | 2014 | 1 |
| Porcys | Poland | The Best Albums of 2000–2009 | 2010 | 2 |
| Rolling Stone | US | The 500 Greatest Albums of All Time | 2020 | 20 |
| Rolling Stone | US | The 100 Best Albums of the Decade | 2009 | 1 |
| Rolling Stone | US | The 40 Greatest Stoner Albums | 2013 | 6 |
| Rolling Stone | US | The 250 Greatest Albums of the 21st Century | 2025 | 2 |
| Spin | US | Top 100 Albums of the Last 20 Years | 2005 | 48 |
| Stylus | US | The 50 Best Albums of 2000–2004 | 2005 | 1 |
| Time | US | The All-Time 100 Albums | 2006 | * |
| The Times | UK | The 100 Best Pop Albums of the Noughties | 2009 | 1 |
| 1001 Albums You Must Hear Before You Die | US | 1001 Albums You Must Hear Before You Die | 2010 | * |
| Musikexpress | Germany | The 50 Best Albums of the New Millennium | 2015 | 3 |
| La Vanguardia | Spain | The Best Albums of the Decade | 2010 | 1 |
| The A.V. Club | US | The Best Music of the Decade | 2009 | 3 |

(*) designates unordered list

=== Later releases ===
Radiohead left EMI after their contract ended in 2003. After a period of being out of print on vinyl, Kid A was reissued as a double LP on 19 August 2008 as part of the "From the Capitol Vaults" series, along with other Radiohead albums. In 2007, EMI released Radiohead Box Set, a compilation of albums recorded while Radiohead were signed to EMI, including Kid A. On 25 August 2009, EMI reissued Kid A in a two-CD "Collector's Edition" and a "Special Collector's Edition" containing an additional DVD. Both versions feature live tracks, taken mostly from television performances. Radiohead had no input into the reissues and the music was not remastered.

The EMI reissues were discontinued after Radiohead's back catalogue transferred to XL Recordings in 2016. In May 2016, XL reissued Kid A on vinyl, along with the rest of Radiohead's back catalogue. An early demo of "The National Anthem" was included in the special edition of the 2017 OK Computer reissue OKNOTOK 1997 2017. In February 2020, Radiohead released an extended version of "Treefingers", previously released on the soundtrack for the 2000 film Memento, to digital platforms.

On November 5, 2021, Radiohead released Kid A Mnesia, an anniversary reissue compiling Kid A, Amnesiac and previously unreleased material. Radiohead promoted it with singles for the previously unreleased tracks "If You Say the Word" and "Follow Me Around". Kid A Mnesia Exhibition, an interactive experience with music and artwork from the albums, was released on November 18 for PlayStation 5, macOS and Windows. A physical installation, Motion Picture House: Kid A Mnesia, opened at the 2026 Coachella festival in California and is set to tour the US. Screenings of the 1922 silent film Nosferatu set to Kid A took place in the UK in October 2025.

== Track listing ==
All songs written by Radiohead. "Idioteque" samples "Mild und Leise" by Paul Lansky and "Short Piece" by Arthur Kreiger.

1. "Everything in Its Right Place" – 4:11
2. "Kid A" – 4:44
3. "The National Anthem" – 5:51
4. "How to Disappear Completely" – 5:56
5. "Treefingers" – 3:42
6. "Optimistic" – 5:15
7. "In Limbo" – 3:31
8. "Idioteque" – 5:09
9. "Morning Bell" – 4:35
10. "Motion Picture Soundtrack" – 7:01
  - Untitled hidden track – 0:52

Note: track 10 ends at 3:20; includes an untitled hidden track from 4:18 until 5:10, followed by 1:51 of silence. On streaming services, the hidden track is listed as a separate track.

== Personnel ==
Credits adapted from liner notes.

Production

- Nigel Godrich – production, engineering, mixing
- Radiohead – production
- Gerard Navarro – production assistance, additional engineering
- Graeme Stewart – additional engineering
- Stanley – artwork ("Landscapes, Knives and Glue")
- Tchock – artwork ("Landscapes, Knives and Glue")
- Chris Blair – mastering

Additional musicians

- Orchestra of St John's – strings
  - John Lubbock – conducting
  - Jonny Greenwood – scoring
- Horns on "The National Anthem"
  - Andy Bush – trumpet
  - Steve Hamilton – alto saxophone (Note: Credited simply as "alto")
  - Martin Hathaway – alto saxophone (etc.)
  - Andy Hamilton – tenor saxophone
  - Mark Lockheart – tenor saxophone
  - Stan Harrison – baritone saxophone
  - Liam Kirkham – trombone
  - Mike Kearsey – bass trombone
- Henry Binns – rhythm sampling on "The National Anthem"

== Charts ==
=== Weekly charts ===
Weekly chart performance for Kid A
| Chart (2000) | Peak position |
|---|---|
| Australian Albums (ARIA) | 2 |
| Austrian Albums (Ö3 Austria) | 5 |
| Belgian Albums (Ultratop Flanders) | 3 |
| Belgian Albums (Ultratop Wallonia) | 4 |
| Canadian Albums (Billboard) | 1 |
| Danish Albums (Hitlisten) | 2 |
| Dutch Albums (Album Top 100) | 4 |
| Finnish Albums (Suomen virallinen lista) | 2 |
| French Albums (SNEP) | 1 |
| German Albums (Offizielle Top 100) | 4 |
| Irish Albums (IRMA) | 1 |
| Italian Albums (FIMI) | 3 |
| Japanese Albums (Oricon) | 3 |
| New Zealand Albums (RMNZ) | 1 |
| Norwegian Albums (VG-lista) | 2 |
| Scottish Albums (Official Charts) | 1 |
| Spanish Albums (AFYVE) | 22 |
| Swedish Albums (Sverigetopplistan) | 3 |
| Swiss Albums (Schweizer Hitparade) | 8 |
| UK Albums (Official Charts) | 1 |
| US Billboard 200 | 1 |

=== Year-end charts ===
2000 year-end chart performance for Kid A
| Chart (2000) | Position |
|---|---|
| Australian Albums (ARIA) | 70 |
| Belgian Albums (Ultratop Flanders) | 71 |
| Belgian Albums (Ultratop Wallonia) | 82 |
| Canadian Albums (Nielsen SoundScan) | 59 |
| Dutch Albums (Album Top 100) | 84 |
| French Albums (SNEP) | 64 |
| UK Albums (OCC) | 50 |
| US Billboard 200 | 190 |

== Certifications and sales ==
Certifications and sales for Kid A
| Region | Certification | Certified units/sales |
|---|---|---|
| Australia (ARIA) | Platinum | 70,000^{^} |
| Canada (Music Canada) | 2× Platinum | 200,000^{‡} |
| Chile | — | 25,000 |
| France (SNEP) | Platinum | 200,000^{*} |
| Italy (FIMI) sales since 2009 | Gold | 25,000^{‡} |
| Japan (RIAJ) | Platinum | 200,000^{^} |
| New Zealand (RMNZ) | Gold | 7,500^{^} |
| Norway (IFPI Norway) | Gold | 25,000^{*} |
| United Kingdom (BPI) | Platinum | 479,000 |
| United States (RIAA) | Platinum | 1,480,000 |
Summaries
| Europe (IFPI) | Platinum | 1,000,000^{*} |
^{*} Sales figures based on certification alone.^{^} Shipments figures based on certification alone.^{‡} Sales+streaming figures based on certification alone.
