= Paul Lansky =

American composer (born 1944)

Paul Lansky (born June 18, 1944, in New York City) is an American composer.

== Biography ==
Paul Lansky (born 1944) is an American composer. He was educated at Manhattan's High School of Music and Art, Queens College and Princeton University, studying with George Perle and Milton Babbitt, among others. He received his Ph.D. in music from Princeton in 1973. His doctoral dissertation consisted of an essay titled "Affine music" and a composition for string quartet. Originally intending to pursue a career in performance, during 1965–66 he played the French horn with the Dorian Wind Quintet. He left the group to attend graduate school. From 1969 until his retirement in 2014, he was on the faculty at Princeton University where he retired as the William Shubael Conant Professor of Music. He chaired the Department from 1991–2000. In 2000 he received a lifetime achievement award from the Society for Electro-Acoustic Music in the United States. In 2009–10 he was the inaugural composer in residence with the Alabama Symphony. In 2016 he was elected to the American Academy of Arts and Letters. He has received grants and awards from the Guggenheim Foundation, the Fromm Foundation and the Koussevitsky Foundation, the National Endowment for the Arts and Chamber Music America, among others.

== Computer music ==
Beginning in the mid 1960s Lansky was among the first to experiment with the computer for sound synthesis. Until 2004 this was his predominant focus. Since then he has alternated between instrumental composition and electronic music.

Sounds originating from "real-world" sources are the predominant focus of Lansky's computer music: traffic, kids in the kitchen, musical instruments, and most of all speech. Electronic synthesis is frequently used but the main sonic resources are transformations of recorded natural sounds. One of his first large pieces, Six Fantasies on a Poem by Thomas Campion (1979) set the stage. It is based on a reading by his wife Hannah MacKay of a famous poem. The piece is not so much a setting of the poem as it is a study of the contours of a live reading of the poem. The work uses a technique known as linear predictive coding, LPC, which was developed in the 1960s by scientists as a data-reduction technique meant to economize on the amount of data needed for digital voice transmission and is used today in some cell phone communication. It allows for the separation of pitch and speed and the pitch contours of the speech can be altered independently of the speed. Each of the six movements explores a different aspect of speech. This led to a series of "chatter" pieces, Idle Chatter, etc. that fragment the speech into a percussive rap-like texture. Other projects included folksong settings (Folk Images), a portrait of a woman (Things She Carried), a contemplation of letters and numbers (Alphabet Book), sounds of the highway (Night Traffic, Ride), blues harmonica, electric guitar, piano improvisation and casual conversation. The bulk of his approximately 70 electronic compositions are contained on ten solo CDs (see Discography). While there are a few pieces for electronics and live instruments the bulk of Lansky's pieces are recorded "tape" pieces.

Lansky's works have attracted interest in various realms. They have been used by dance companies (Bill T. Jones, Eliot Feld Ballet, New York City Ballet). His works frequently have a rhythmic "groove" that is attractive to dancers. In 2000 he was the co-subject (along with Francis Dhomont) of a documentary film made for the European Arte network by Uli Aumüller, My Cinema for the Ears that deals with the use of natural sounds. A four-chord sequence from Lansky's first large computer piece Mild und leise (1972) was sampled by the English rock band Radiohead for the track "Idioteque" on their 2000 Kid A album.

== Software ==
Lansky used any available computing hardware: IBM mainframes at first (1966–84), then mini and micro computers by DEC, (1984–89), and finally personal computers by NeXT, Silicon Graphics and Apple Computer. During the mainframe era computer time was scarce and expensive, and this prompted Lansky to write his own software package called Mix, in Fortran. This made it easier to assemble a composition voice-by-voice, section-by-section, even note-by-note, avoiding large expensive runs to create an entire piece at once. Mix had no scheduler (meaning that it could create notes in any order) and thus was not suitable for real-time synthesis. Mix used additive writes to the output device, analogous to overdubbing on tape. When the move was made to minis and micros, Lansky ported Mix to the C programming language and called it CMix. During the late 1990s a group led by Brad Garton at Columbia University created a version with a scheduler, RtCmix, that was capable of real time synthesis. Starting in the mid 1990s Lansky used a well-known software package called SuperCollider. Programs like Cmix and SuperCollider are script-based rather than driven by a graphical interface. (Input data is frequently in the form of a program rather than a note list.) This facilitated the creation of complex textures in works such as Idle Chatter, which contain thousands of short notes, frequently selected using random methods. This is sometimes called algorithmic composition.

== Instrumental music ==
During the mid 1990s Lansky began to be approached by performers who were attracted to the performative-like aspects of his computer music. Percussionists in particular were attracted by pieces such as Table’s Clear, which resembles a gamelan made of pots and pans, and the "chatter" series. One of his first large percussion pieces was Threads, 2005, written for the Sō Percussion quartet. Since then there are about a dozen pieces for percussion instruments, alone and in various ensembles. Another focus has been classical guitar, alone and in combination: Semi-Suite, With the Grain (concerto), Partita (guitar and percussion.) A residency with the Alabama Symphony led to several orchestral pieces (Shapeshifters, Imaginary Islands). Significant commissions came from the Library of Congress and the Chamber Music Society of Lincoln Center for the wind quintet The Long and Short of It, and Chamber Music America for a trio for the Janus Trio, Book of Memory, and for Sō Percussion, Springs. The 2004 trio for horn, violin and piano, Etudes and Parodies won the 2005 International Horn Society prize. Lansky's instrumental music is published by Carl Fischer. The bulk of his computer music as well as much instrumental music is available on Bridge Records.

== Harmony ==
Most of Lansky's works are basically tonal. In general terms this means the apparent background source for his pitch language is the diatonic scale rather than the chromatic or microtonal scale. He frequently uses traditional tonal syntax. During 1969–72 he collaborated with George Perle on an expansion of Perle's 12-tone tonality, which led to Perle's book of the same name. This approach basically establishes another metric for measuring and relating harmonies that has to do with symmetry. It is related to some music by Bartok. Some of Lansky's work such as Notes to Self, for piano, and It All Adds Up, for two pianos, use this approach. Lansky's instrumental music generally eschews extended instrumental techniques. He writes that he scratched that itch with computer music.

A long-term interest of Lansky's is music "about" music. Earlier examples of this are his computer pieces Guy's Harp, about blues harmonica, and Not So Heavy Metal, about rock and roll guitar. More recent examples are Book of Memory, which comments on music from Machaut to Scriabin, Ancient Echoes, based on late-16th-century dance music, and Ricercare Plus, inspired by 17th-century counterpoint.

== Discography ==
- Smalltalk, 1990 (New Albion Records 030)
- Homebrew, 1992 (Bridge Records 9035)
- More Than Idle Chatter, 1994 (Bridge 9050)
- Fantasies And Tableaux, 1994 (Composers Recordings, Inc. 683)
- Folk Images, 1995 (Bridge 9060)
- Things She Carried, 1997 (Bridge 9076)
- Conversation Pieces, 1998 (Bridge 9083)
- Ride, 2001 (Bridge 9103)
- Alphabet Book, 2002 (Bridge 9126)
- Music Box, 2006 (Bridge 9210)
- Etudes and Parodies, 2007 (Bridge 9222)
- Threads, 2011 (Cantaloupe Music 21064)
- Imaginary Islands, 2012 (Bridge 9366)
- Comix Trips, 2012 (Meyer Media)
- Notes to Self, 2013 (Bridge 9405)
- Textures and Threads, 2014 (Bridge 9435)
- Contemplating Weather,2015 (Bridge 9447)
- Book of Memory, 2016 (New Focus Recordings fcr 176)
- Idle Fancies, 2015 (Bridge 9454)

== See also ==
- Joseph H. Bearns Prize

== Sources ==
- Antokoletz, Elliott. 2001. "Lansky, Paul". The New Grove Dictionary of Music and Musicians, second edition, edited by Stanley Sadie and John Tyrrell. London: Macmillan Publishers.
- Code, David L. 1990. "Observations in the Art of Speech: Paul Lansky’s Six Fantasies". Perspective of New Music 28, no. 1 (Fall): 144–69.
- Roads, Curtis. 1983. "Interview with Paul Lansky". Computer Music Journal 7, no. 3:16–24.
