= John Lubbock (conductor) =

English conductor and singer

John Lubbock is an English music conductor and singer, and founder of the Orchestra of St John's Smith Square, now known as the Orchestra of St John's (OSJ), which he has brought to prominence including performances at The Proms as well as engaging in outreach and charity work.

== Orchestra of St John's Smith Square ==
Lubbock founded the Orchestra of St John's Smith Square in 1967. He led the orchestra on tours to Italy, Spain, Germany, Belgium and the USA. He also appeared with them at the Bulgarian, Bratislava and Turku festivals in the 1980s, and in a Southern Television programme with the Labèque sisters. In August 1985 he and the orchestra took part in the premiere of Iain Hamilton’s opera Lancelot.

He conducted recordings of Mendelssohn's symphony No. 3 and symphony No. 4 (ACM), Stravinsky’s Apollon musagète and Orpheus (ACM), Dvorak's and Tchaikovsky's string serenades (ASV) and of Mozart overtures (ACM).

In 1985 Lubbock conducted the world premiere of a reconstruction by Philip Wilby of a Sinfonia concertante in A for the programme 'Mozart's Unfinished’. He also conducted the choral soundtrack for Doomwatch Winter Angel (1999), a feature-length television drama.

== The Proms ==
During his career Lubbock has conducted six Proms concerts at the Royal Albert Hall, between 1976 and 2006. These included world premieres (by Stephen Montague, John Harle, Benjamin Wallfisch) and Proms premieres (Lou Silver Harrison, Colin McPhee, Jerónimo Giménez and Mozart's Thamos, King of Egypt, K 345) as well as the Beethoven Triple Concerto with Yefim Bronfman, Shlomo Mintz, and Yo-Yo Ma.

Sir Simon Rattle has described him as "one of our most musical assets – a thoughtful perfectionist and a musician of total integrity."

== Awards and recognition ==
He was awarded an Honorary Fellowship of the Royal Academy of Music in July 1999. He was awarded an OBE in the 2015 New Year Honours List.
