= Everything in Its Right Place =

Song by Radiohead

from the album Kid A
- Released: 2 October 2000
- Recorded: 1999
- Genre: Electronica; post-rock
- Length: 4:11
- Label: Parlophone; Capitol
- Songwriter: Radiohead
- Producers: Nigel Godrich; Radiohead

Audio sample
- file; help

"Everything in Its Right Place" is a song by the English rock band Radiohead, released as the opening track of their fourth studio album, Kid A (2000). It features synthesiser, digitally manipulated vocals, mixed modes and unusual time signatures. The lyrics were inspired by the stress felt by the singer, Thom Yorke, while promoting Radiohead's album OK Computer (1997).

Yorke wrote "Everything in Its Right Place" on piano. Radiohead worked on it in a conventional band arrangement before transferring it to synthesiser, and described it as a breakthrough in the album recording. The band members said it helped them accept that not every member needed to play on every song, and to use greater restraint in song arrangement.

"Everything in Its Right Place" represented a change in Radiohead's style and working methods, shifting to a more experimental approach. Though it alienated some listeners, it was named one of the best songs of the decade by several publications. The minimalist composer Steve Reich reinterpreted "Everything in Its Right Place" for his 2012 composition Radio Rewrite.

== Writing ==
Following the success of Radiohead's 1997 album OK Computer, the songwriter, Thom Yorke, had a mental breakdown. He suffered from writer's block and became disillusioned with rock music. Instead, he listened almost exclusively to the electronic music of Warp artists such as Aphex Twin and Autechre, saying: "It was refreshing because the music was all structures and had no human voices in it. But I felt just as emotional about it as I'd ever felt about guitar music."

Yorke bought a house in Cornwall and spent his time walking the cliffs and drawing, restricting his musical activity to playing his new grand piano. "Everything in Its Right Place" was the first song he wrote, followed by "Pyramid Song". Yorke described himself as a "shit piano player", and took inspiration from a quote by Tom Waits saying that ignorance of instruments gives him inspiration. Yorke said: "That's one of the reasons I wanted to get into computers and synths, because I didn't understand how the fuck they worked. I had no idea what ADSR meant." He would "endlessly" play the "Everything in its Right Place" melody, attempting to "meditate out of" his depression.

Yorke denied that the lyrics were gibberish, and said they expressed the depression he experienced on the OK Computer tour. He cited a performance at the NEC Arena in Birmingham, England, in 1997: "I came off at the end of that show sat in the dressing room and couldn't speak ... People were saying, 'You all right?' I knew people were speaking to me. But I couldn't hear them ... I'd just so had enough. And I was bored with saying I'd had enough." He said "Everything In Its Right Place" was about "trying to fit into the right place and the right box so you can connect".

The line "yesterday I woke up sucking a lemon" references the sour-faced expression Yorke said he wore "for three years". He hesitated to use the line, but recorded it at the encouragement of Radiohead's producer, Nigel Godrich. Yorke said it was "pretty silly ... I thought it was funny when I sang it. When I listened to it afterwards, it meant something else."

== Recording ==
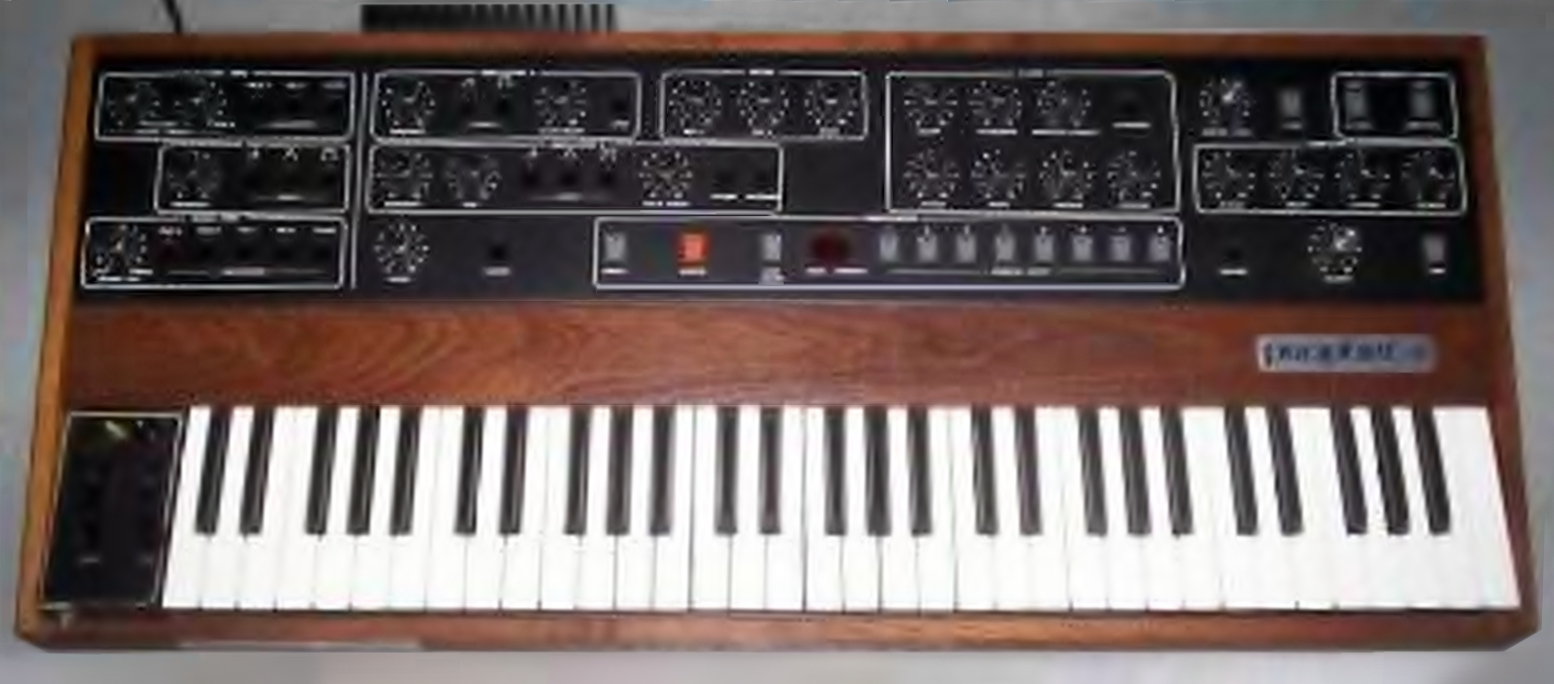
A Prophet-5 synthesiser

According to the bassist, Colin Greenwood, Godrich was initially unimpressed by the song. Radiohead and Godrich worked on it in a conventional band arrangement during sessions in Copenhagen and Paris, but without results. In Gloucestershire, Yorke and Godrich transferred it from piano to a Prophet-5 synthesiser. Godrich processed Yorke's vocals using a scrubbing tool in the music software Pro Tools.

The lead guitarist, Jonny Greenwood, said "Everything In Its Right Place" was a turning point in the making of Kid A: "We knew it had to be the first song, and everything just followed after it." He said it was the first time Radiohead had been happy to leave a song sparse, instead of "layering on top of what's a very good song or a very good sound, and hiding it, camouflaging it in case it's not good enough". The guitarist Ed O'Brien and the drummer, Philip Selway, said it forced them to accept that not every song needed every band member to play on it. O'Brien said: "It forced the issue, immediately! And to be genuinely sort of delighted that you'd been working for six months on this record and something great has come out of it, and you haven't contributed to it, is a really liberating feeling."

A performance of "Everything in Its Right Place" was included on the 2001 album I Might Be Wrong: Live Recordings. For live performances, Yorke plays Rhodes piano, while Greenwood manipulates his vocals with a Kaoss Pad.

== Composition ==
"Everything in its Right Place" is an electronic song featuring synthesiser and digitally manipulated vocals. It uses unusual time signatures and mixed modes, staples of Radiohead's songwriting. O'Brien observed that it lacks the crescendos of Radiohead's previous songs. Adam Zwi of Radio National described it as dissonant and "ominous". NME likened it to electronic music released on the record label Warp, with "minimalism and all manner of glitchy creepiness" and "weirdly hymnal dreamscape of ambient keys".

The minimalist composer Steve Reich reinterpreted "Everything in Its Right Place" for his 2012 composition Radio Rewrite. He noted its unusual harmonic movement: "It was originally in F minor, and it never comes down to the one chord, the F minor chord is never stated. So there's never a tonic, there's never a cadence in the normal sense." He also noted that the word "everything" follows the dominant and tonic: "The tonic and the dominant are the end of every Beethoven symphony, the end of everything in classical music ... I'm sure Thom did it intuitively, I'm sure he wasn't thinking about it ... but it's perfect, it is everything."

== Reception ==
"Everything in Its Right Place" alienated critics who had hoped for more of the rock music of Radiohead's previous albums. NME described it as "the moment where Radiohead finally left behind the limitations of being an alt rock band and embraced a whole wide world of weirdness". In 2009, Pitchfork described the shock some fans experienced hearing it for the first time:

What was this shit? If everything was really in its right place, where were the fucking guitars ... And whose crackling old keyboards were those? And why did rock's razor-sharp voice suddenly sound as if it'd been broken into bits by a centrifuge? ... "Everything in Its Right Place" – a sharp-tongued kiss-off that stood on the shoulders of different giants, like krautrock, Stockhausen, and Squarepusher – poured new possibilities into several previously hermetic circles. And it was too hypnotic to dare apologise.

Reviewing Kid A, the Guardian critic Alexis Petridis called "Everything in Its Right Place" a "messy and inconsequential doodle". The Melody Maker critic Mark Beaumont dismissed it as a "haphazard and pointless synth'n'laptop experiment". Reviewing Kid A for the New Yorker, Nick Hornby described his disappointment in the song: "'Hey! I can handle experimentalism!' you think, but your confidence is immediately knocked flat by the lyrics." NME described it as a "beautiful triumph of understatement" and a "pointed" opener.

"Everything In Its Right Place" was named one of the best tracks of the decade by Rolling Stone, NME and Pitchfork. In 2018, Vice said it was one of Radiohead's signature songs. In a 2020 piece for the Guardian, Jazz Monroe named it the 25th-best Radiohead song, writing: "Like David Byrne before him, Yorke had renounced his authorship to flirt with self-erasure, yielding to gorgeously sunlit synths."

== In popular culture ==
"Everything In Its Right Place" was used in the opening of Cameron Crowe's Vanilla Sky in 2001, the trailer for The Accountant in 2016, The Creator in 2023, and the Daredevil: Born Again episode "Straight to Hell" in 2025. In 2026, it was used in a montage in 28 Years Later: The Bone Temple.

== Personnel ==
Credits adapted from the Kid A liner notes.

- Nigel Godrich – production
- Radiohead – production
- Gerard Navarro – production assistance, additional engineering
- Graeme Stewart – additional engineering
- Chris Blair – mastering

== Certifications ==
Region	Certification	Certified units/sales
Canada (Music Canada)	Gold	40,000^{‡}
New Zealand (RMNZ)	Gold	15,000^{‡}
United Kingdom (BPI)	Silver	200,000^{‡}
^{‡} Sales+streaming figures based on certification alone.
