= List of Radiohead live performances =

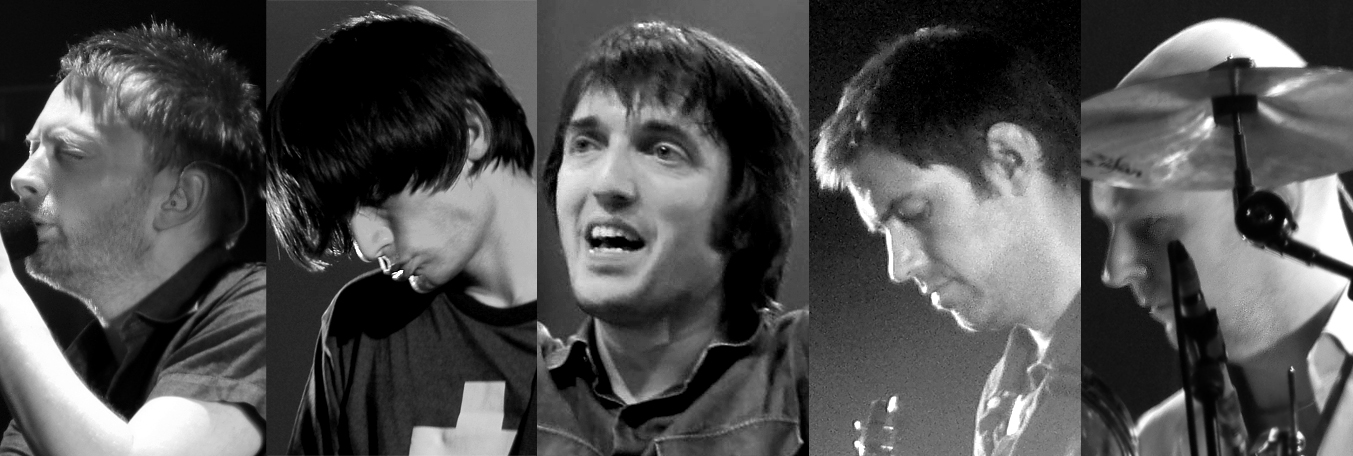
Radiohead (left to right): Thom Yorke, Jonny Greenwood, Colin Greenwood, Ed O'Brien and Phil Selway

The English rock band Radiohead have performed in Europe, North America, Australia, Asia and South America. The band's line-up has been constant since its founding, consisting of Thom Yorke (vocals and guitar), Jonny Greenwood (guitar), Ed O'Brien (guitar), Colin Greenwood (bass guitar), and Phil Selway (drums). The role that each band member plays during performances has changed dramatically throughout the band's history. Drummer and percussionist Clive Deamer has joined Radiohead for performances since the release of their 2011 album The King of Limbs.

Radiohead formed under the name On a Friday in 1986 and performed shows in the Oxford area under this name until 1991. They toured extensively across the United States and Europe in support of their debut album, Pablo Honey and their performances were credited for the success of Pablo Honey and their debut single "Creep". Radiohead toured widely in support of The Bends and its singles.

== History ==
=== On a Friday (1985–1991) ===
Radiohead's first incarnation was called On a Friday, founded in 1985 while the members were all attending the public boys-only Abingdon School in Abingdon, Oxfordshire. Thom Yorke was on vocals and guitar, Colin Greenwood played bass guitar, Ed O'Brien played rhythm guitar, and Phil Selway played drums. Future guitarist Jonny Greenwood played harmonica as a guest member at these shows, and later keyboards as a permanent member. The band would also feature three saxophone players in their live show until the late 1980s. Colin Greenwood later said that, during the band's earliest live performances, "We wore all black and played very loud, because we thought that's what you had to do." The band's early gigs took place at various parties around town, rather than concerts. The band members split up to attend university but reunited during breaks for rehearsals and occasional performances. On a Friday's first concert in a conventional venue was at the Jericho Tavern in Jericho, Oxford, in 1987; the performance had few attendants and was negatively received by participants in the local music scene.

On a Friday fully resumed in 1991, and Jonny Greenwood's role in the group changed to third guitarist. Shoegazing bands such as Ride and Swervedriver were a prominent local trend, one which On a Friday did not fit into. The band's first reunited show was at the Hollybush in Osney on 22 July 1991. Although the band played to an audience of only six people, they were well received. According to Radiohead biographer Mac Randall, "Yorke's dramatic singing style and frighteningly intense onstage demeanor—one moment tightly focused, the next seemingly ready to burst open—was already coming to the fore", and the band played in a garage rock style. O'Brien spread the band's three-song demo Dungeon Demo around the community, which earned the band a number of gigs, mostly at the Jericho Tavern. Members of the band would also occasionally busk. Producer Chris Hufford attended an On a Friday show at the Jericho Tavern on 8 August 1991, and later described the band as "a lot rougher, a lot punkier, quite frenetic and [playing at] a faster tempo [than they would play at later]". Hufford was so impressed that he had the band record a new demo, Manic Hedgehog, at his Courtyard Studios. Shortly afterward, the band signed to EMI and changed their name to Radiohead, the change being inspired by a Talking Heads song of the same name (see Radiohead). By the time of the signing, the band had dropped some of their older songs off of concert set lists. Radiohead played fewer than ten shows in 1991.

=== Pablo Honey (1992–1993) ===
The band's first tour began in April 1992, supporting Catherine Wheel. Because of a two-week delay of their debut extended play, Drill, Radiohead had no music on sale to promote. Despite challenges the band faced adapting to regular touring, their performances were generally well received by audiences. After the recording sessions for Radiohead's debut studio album Pablo Honey, the band toured in support of The Frank and Walters until mid-October 1992. The band then toured with Kingmaker, opening for a juggler before the main band came on. During this tour, Yorke would randomly cut off clumps of his hair, and frequently became heavily intoxicated on alcohol, often to the point where the band would have to cancel shows. Yorke would later attribute this behavior his frustrations with the band's perceived directionless in defining themselves. In 1992, the band played over 100 shows across most of the United Kingdom. The year ended with a highly negative review of Radiohead's live show in the NME, in which writer Keith Cameron wrote "Radiohead are a pitiful, lily-livered excuse for a rock 'n' roll group."

Radiohead played a few dates in the UK in January 1993. On the strength of the band's new single "Creep" in Israel, the band played three shows in Tel Aviv in March 1993, where they found wide recognition for the first time. After returning from Tel Aviv they played a number of dates in the UK, and also played at the Bevrijdingspop Festival in Haarlem, the band's first concert in the Netherlands. Around this time, Radiohead became known for their violent performances; the guitarists regularly cut open their fingers with the instruments, and Yorke once gashed his head on his guitar. Yorke said "there's always loads of blood on the guitars at the end of the night. 'Performance' for us means we don't know what we're going to do." Radiohead's first tour in the United States and Canada, starting on 11 July 1993 at Slim's in San Francisco, took place over the course of a month in clubs in Boston, New York City, Chicago, Detroit, Toronto, Seattle, Los Angeles, and Dallas. This tour was, like the tour in Israel, made possible due to the growing popularity of "Creep". Radiohead performed live on television for the first time, on The Arsenio Hall Show followed by an appearance on the MTV show Beach Party. The band also played at the Whisky a Go Go in West Hollywood, California, and although the show sold out in 20 minutes the band considered the performance to be a failure. The US tour was considered a success, credited for placing "Creep" at its peak of number 34 on the Billboard Hot 100, placing Pablo Honey at number 32 on the Billboard 200, and for pushing Pablo Honey to a Gold RIAA certification for shipping 500,000 units. Yorke, however, had mixed feelings about the tour, and later said "Our so-called success in America... allowed us to do a lot of things, but it also meant that somehow we owed somebody something."

In August, the band played at a festival in Belgium and two in the Netherlands. The band canceled an appearance at the Reading Festival because of Yorke's stress-induced laryngitis. EMI reissued "Creep" in the UK, and it charted at number seven, prompting an appearance by the band on Top of the Pops. Although Capitol Records had wanted Radiohead to tour again in the US with labelmates Duran Duran, Hufford convinced the label otherwise, and Radiohead returned to the US for a month-long tour supporting Belly. On this tour, Radiohead played at the 40 Watt Club in Athens, Georgia. A performance on this tour received a mixed response from Chicago Sun-Times writer Jae-Ha Kim, who criticized Yorke's singing voice but wrote that "Jonny Greenwood's fuzzy guitar playing was authoritative, dictating the mopey melodies and complementing Ed O'Brien's rhythm guitars." After the Belly tour ended, Radiohead played a frustrating show at the Aladdin Theatre in Las Vegas, Nevada, opening for Tears for Fears. Radiohead finished in the US and toured in Canada, playing in Vancouver, Calgary, Montreal, and Toronto. Yorke told a newspaper reporter while in Canada that "I think so far we've played 350 dates in support of this album in Europe and North America. That's a hell of a lot of miles." The band then played a tour backing James, taking place across Germany, France, Switzerland, Spain, Portugal, and the UK. During this final tour, conflict among the band increased. Exhaustion from touring, Yorke's egotism, and frustration from repeatedly playing "Creep" all contributed to the band's in-fighting. The tour was nearly canceled, but during a meeting, the band members decided against it. According to band agent Charlie Myatt, the band "played like demons" during the final segment of the James tour. Touring ended on 13 December 1993, and the band members took a break. Jonny Greenwood summarized the previous year of touring by saying "We joined this band to write songs and be musicians, but we spend a year being jukeboxes instead."

=== My Iron Lung (1994) ===
Radiohead returned to touring in May 1994. The touring schedule had dates in Spain, Italy, Switzerland, Germany, the UK, Japan, Hong Kong, Australia, and New Zealand. The tour found the band in the middle of fruitless sessions for their upcoming album, The Bends, so performing live was considered a welcome change. The band introduced many of the new songs from The Bends for the first time, though "Creep" was still a crowd favorite. Radiohead performed at Manchester University, and Yorke expressed anxiety about possible negative reception due to the band's cancellation of their appearance at Reading Festival the year prior, saying to the audience "I was scared shitless about tonight." During the concert, Yorke damaged his left ankle and suffered a stress fracture, an injury which required a brace but did not delay the tour. A performance by the band at the London Astoria was recorded and frequently broadcast by MTV Europe. The audio from the same show from the song "My Iron Lung" would be used as the recording for The Bends, albeit with a re-recorded vocal. While in the UK, Jonny Greenwood was diagnosed with repetitive strain injury in his right arm from his rapid guitar playing, and was required to wear a brace. Greenwood continued to wear the brace well past the point where it was necessary as a sort of trademark, saying "It's like taping up your fingers before a boxing match. It's a ritual." By the time the band had returned from the tour, they found recording easier, leading producer John Leckie to comment, "I think it helped that they'd been on tour because they had confidence in a lot of the songs again, which I think they'd maybe lost during that lengthy recording period." The band played at some summer festivals, including appearances at Glastonbury Festival, Roskilde in Denmark and the Sopot Marlboro Rock Festival in Poland. The band agreed that their most important performance that summer, and the one they were most nervous about, was Reading Festival. However, reception at the festival was positive, though Hufford felt the band put too much unfamiliar material in their set.

The band played a ten-date tour in the UK from 27 September to 8 October in support of the recently released "My Iron Lung" single, including a performance for the Oxfam Rwandan Relief Fund. The band raised £7,000 in support of victims of the Rwandan genocide, and a review of the show by Ian Watson Melody Maker noted that, while "Creep" was "naturally" the "pinnacle" of the show, new songs like "My Iron Lung", "Just", and "Black Star" were also highlights. The UK shows were followed by two concerts in Bangkok and an eight-date tour of Mexico. During the Mexican tour, the band members had a number of emotional outbursts; as O'Brian described it, "Things had been brewing and they came to a head." Following the tour in Mexico, Yorke and Jonny Greenwood played many shows in the US by themselves with only acoustic instruments, a format which was soon repeated for four shows in England before the release of the "High and Dry" / "Planet Telex" single. Radiohead played a gig with Supergrass and the Candyskins at the Apollo Theatre for an audience of journalists and EMI executives, a performance which garnered praise from Melody Maker. The band also played at a benefit for and at the Venue, a club they had frequented while still called On a Friday. The Venue and much of the local Oxford music scene were unable to continue business; due to Radiohead's concert, the Venue survived, and the club is now renamed The Zodiac.

=== The Bends (1995) ===
The Bends was released on 13 March 1995. Radiohead toured in the UK from February to late March in support of The Bends. Audience reception was overwhelmingly positive, and many of the dates were sold out. One date on the tour, at Sheffield, was canceled due to Yorke contracting a stomach flu. The band went on to perform in Japan and North America; Radiohead would cross the US six times in promotion of The Bends. Yorke and Jonny Greenwood also played several new acoustic sets, though Greenwood stated around this time that "We do hate this acoustic thing. It's evil, the idea." By the time the US tour for The Bends officially began, Yorke had a build-up of fluid in his ears from his regular airplane flying, which worried him that he was going deaf. On the debut show of the tour in Boston, Yorke lashed out at moshers in the crowd, yelling and hitting one with his guitar. On 29 May, Yorke had a "breakdown" and begged tour manager Tim Greaves to book him a flight back to England. Other members of the band were also suffering from stress and fatigue, with O'Brien noting "We had two weeks off last year [in 1994], and we've been together every single day since January this year." In spite of Radiohead's touring, The Bends did not perform as well as Pablo Honey in the US, though it reached the top ten charts in the UK.

In July, R.E.M. chose Radiohead as the opening act for the European leg of its Monster tour, a decision made because the members of R.E.M. were fans of The Bends but had never heard Radiohead live. R.E.M. was an early and lasting influence on Radiohead, and during the tour the two bands shared admiration. Yorke wrote, after Michael Stipe revealed himself to be a Radiohead fan, that "I've never believed in hero worship but I have to admit to myself that I'm fighting for breath." Jonny Greenwood similarly felt that "It's been exciting and embarrassing, them watching us from the wings every night. It's enormously surreal." Stipe stated during a concert with Radiohead in Tel Aviv that "There aren't many things that scare me, but Radiohead are so good they scare me." By August Radiohead were playing on their own again in Europe, debuting a number of new songs including "Subterranean Homesick Alien" and "Lucky". Radiohead played a short number of dates opening for both R.E.M. and Soul Asylum in the US, before returning to the UK and Europe for more touring. More physical ailments afflicted the band, as Greenwood suffered hearing problems and needed to wear soundproof headphones and Yorke began losing his voice. On top of this, all of the band's gear was stolen, canceling a number of shows. These problems culminated with Yorke fainting on stage, an event characterized in the NME as a "temper tantrum". By December 1995 and January 1996, the band had stopped touring and returned home.

=== OK Computer and Against Demons tour (1996–1998) ===
Radiohead resumed touring in the US in March 1996. EMI, encouraged by the high ranking of The Bends in many year-end best-of lists, began a new marketing push in the US. With the combined force of EMI's renewed efforts and Radiohead's constant touring, the album reentered the Billboard charts, peaked at number 88, and was certified gold. The band appeared on both The Tonight Show, which Yorke described as "the highlight of our entire fucking year", and 120 Minutes. New songs had an increasing presence on set lists for this tour. Among these were ones that would be on the band's third album OK Computer, such as "No Surprises", "Let Down", and "Electioneering". The tour also found Yorke more willing to exercise restraint in his vocals and onstage mannerisms, and Greenwood more willing to improvise on established songs. The band played at Pinkpop Festival and Rock Werchter. Jae-Ha Kim wrote in the Chicago Sun-Times, reviewing a performance by Radiohead at Metro Chicago, that their "intense touring schedule (more than 110 dates in America alone) has transformed it from a good live group into a great one." In a review of the T in the Park festival, the NME called Radiohead "The Last Great Sincere Rock Band".

The band supported Alanis Morissette for 13 dates of her Jagged Little Pill tour. They used the opportunity to hone their new material, including "Paranoid Android", a multisectioned song that then stretched to over 14 minutes. In spite of Radiohead's sound being markedly different from that of Morissette, the audience reaction was "tremendous", according to Mac Randall. Capitol employee Clark Staub said, "If they'd been allowed an encore, Radiohead would have got an encore." "It was silly money and it gave us a chance to work out everything live," Colin Greenwood recalled. "That, and the strangely perverse kick out of being these five men in black, scaring prepubescent American girls with our own brand of dark music." Between recording sessions for OK Computer, Yorke and Jonny Greenwood played a secret gig for Dazed & Confused magazine, performing three songs from The Bends and four new songs.

The band performed a preview of OK Computer in Lisbon in mid-May, and marked the beginning of the Against Demons tour at the album's "launch" on 22 May and 24 May in Barcelona. The set list for the first Barcelona show, at the Zeleste Club, included nearly every song on OK Computer, several from The Bends, and only "You" from Pablo Honey. The show, which had three encores, garnered positive reception in a review in Mojo. After the Barcelona shows, the members were already showing signs of stress and exhaustion; particularly Yorke, whose mood and conduct during interviews ranged from relaxed to highly irritable. Starting in Barcelona, the band's performances and other promotional activities on the tour were filmed by Grant Gee. Overall, the "OK Computer" tour lasted from May 1997 until April 1998, playing over 100 shows throughout the world, in Europe, Asia and Australia, the U.S.

=== Kid A and Amnesiac (1999–2001) ===
In mid-2000, Radiohead toured the Mediterranean, performing Kid A and Amnesiac songs for the first time. Later that year, Radiohead toured Europe in a custom-built tent without corporate logos, playing mostly new songs. They also performed three concerts in North American theatres, their first in nearly three years. The small venues sold out rapidly, attracting celebrities, and fans who camped overnight. In October, Radiohead performed on the American comedy show Saturday Night Live; the performance shocked some viewers expecting rock songs, with Jonny Greenwood playing electronic instruments, the house brass band improvising over "The National Anthem", and Yorke dancing erratically to "Idioteque". From June until late October 2000, Radiohead played over 40 shows.

The Amnesiac tour began in late May 2001, playing in the Rock Am Ring and Rock Im Park festivals in Germany. Incorporating Radiohead's first North American tour in three years, the tour lasted for 4.5 months, with nearly 40 shows to add as well. In July, following the US tour, Radiohead performed a homecoming concert in South Park, Oxford, with supporting performances by Lyttelton, Beck, Sigur Rós and Supergrass. It was Radiohead's first performance in Oxford since 1996, and was attended by 42,000 people. According to the journalist Alex Ross, it may have been the largest public gathering in Oxford history. The concert raised £145,000, which Radiohead donated to local charities including Samaritans, a homeless shelter and the Orchestra of St John's, which performed on Kid A and Amnesiac. Recordings from the Kid A and Amnesiac tours were released on I Might Be Wrong: Live Recordings in November 2001.

=== Hail to the Thief (2002–2004) ===
In summer 2002, Radiohead began playing 12 shows in Portugal and Spain as a warm-up exercise before the September sessions that led to Hail to the Thief. Roughly 12 tracks of the 14 that eventually comprised the album appeared on this initial tour, as Radiohead have attempted before and famously after during the 2006 tour that pre-dated In Rainbows.

On May 17, 2003, the European leg of the Hail to the Thief tour began with two shows in Dublin's Olympia Theatre. During the summer, Radiohead toured throughout Europe and the U.S., reaching new levels of audiences in Festivals as well as headlining shows, supported in places by slowcore band Low and electronic music artist Four Tet.

In September and October 2003, the band played successful shows in the Hollywood Bowl and at the Madison Square Garden, with two shows at each venue. The tour continued into 2004, as the band traveled to Japan and Australia, and ended on May 1, 2004, as the band headlined Coachella, after over 100 shows worldwide. It was Coachella's first sellout, drawing a two-day total of 110,000 people.

=== In Rainbows (2005–2009) ===
Radiohead began touring again in 2006, the first gig being in Copenhagen on 6 May. This tour was about the band "getting back into" the momentum of playing songs and recording after a year's hiatus in 2004. Many new songs that would later appear on In Rainbows were roadtested on this tour, notably "Videotape" at the Hammersmith Apollo gig on 15 May. Other songs that made their debut on this tour were "Jigsaw Falling into Place" (tentatively "Open Pick"), "15 Step", "Bodysnatchers", "All I Need" and some B-sides, such as "4 Minute Warning", "Bangers + Mash" and "Last Flowers".

"Weird Fishes / Arpeggi" was also played, as was "Nude", although both of these songs date back to before the 2006 tour. The tour is notable as these versions of the songs were often very different from the eventual In Rainbows incarnations.

Radiohead also played the V Festival, as well as gigs throughout Europe, the UK, Canada and the USA.

The In Rainbows tour started in May 2008 in the US, continued in Europe, returned to the US and Canada. After this the band performed in Japan in October, finishing the first half of the tour. The tour continued in 2009 starting in Latin America with Kraftwerk as guests, and ended on the final night of the reading festival 2009, after over 60 shows worldwide.

Radiohead returned to Mexico for first time since 1994 with two concerts on 15 and 16 March, and had their debut live performance in Brazil, Argentina and Chile in March 2009. Concerts were held in Rio de Janeiro and São Paulo on the 20th and 22nd, Buenos Aires on the 24th, and two were held in Santiago, on the 26th and 27th.

=== The King of Limbs (2010–2012) ===
Radiohead did not perform The King of Limbs live until several months after its release, as Yorke wanted to continue studio work and it took some time to arrange the album for performance. To perform the complex rhythms, they enlisted a second drummer, Clive Deamer, who had worked with Portishead and Get the Blessing. Selway said: "That was fascinating. One played in the traditional way, the other almost mimicked a drum machine. It was push-and-pull, like kids at play, really interesting." Deamer has joined Radiohead for subsequent tours.

Radiohead performed The King of Limbs in its entirety for The King of Limbs: Live from the Basement, broadcast in July 2011 and released on DVD and Blu-ray in December 2011. On 24 June 2011, Radiohead played a surprise performance on the Park stage at the 2011 Glastonbury Festival, performing songs from The King of Limbs before an audience for the first time.^{[106]} In September, they played two dates at New York City's Roseland Ballroom and made American TV appearances including a one-hour special episode of The Colbert Report and the season premiere of Saturday Night Live. In 2012, Radiohead toured Europe, North America, and Asia, with appearances at the Bonnaroo, Coachella and Fuji Rock festivals. They played mainly arenas, as O'Brien said the "precise and detailed" King of Limbs material would not suit outdoor venues.

On 16 June 2012, the stage collapsed during the setup for a show at Toronto's Downsview Park, killing drum technician Scott Johnson and injuring three other members of Radiohead's road crew. The show was canceled and Radiohead's tour dates in Europe were postponed. After rescheduling the tour, Radiohead paid tribute to Johnson and their stage crew at their next concert, in Nîmes, France, in July. In 2013, Live Nation Canada Inc, two other organisations and an engineer were charged with 13 charges. Following a delay caused by mistrial, the case was dropped in 2017 under the Jordan ruling, which puts time limits on cases. A 2019 inquest returned a verdict of accidental death.

=== A Moon Shaped Pool (2016–2018) ===
On 14 March 2016, six days after releasing their ninth studio album, A Moon Shaped Pool, Radiohead announced a world tour, joined again by Deamer. The tour began on 20 May 2016 at the Heineken Music Hall, during which Radiohead debuted nine of eleven tracks from AMSP; "Glass Eyes" and "True Love Waits" were debuted at later shows. The tour saw the returns of "Creep" and "Let Down", which had not been played for seven and ten years respectively. The final show took place on 7 October at Austin City Limits, Yorke's 48th birthday, and ended with "Fake Plastic Trees".

On 31 October, the band confirmed a 2017 tour by adding a list of European tour dates to their website. They began a second US tour in March 2017, culminating in a headline slot at the April 2017 Coachella festival in California marred by technical problems. A European tour followed in June and July with several festival shows, including Radiohead's third headline performance at Glastonbury Festival in the UK. In 2018, Radiohead toured North and South America from April to August, including four nights at Madison Square Garden in New York City, with Jonny Greenwood's project Junun as the support act. It was the 61st-highest-grossing tour of 2018, earning over US$28 million.

The Moon Shaped Pool tour included a performance in Tel Aviv on 19 July 2017, disregarding the Boycott, Divestment and Sanctions campaign for an international cultural boycott of Israel. The decision was criticised by artists including musician Roger Waters and filmmaker Ken Loach, and a petition urging Radiohead to cancel it was signed by more than 50 prominent figures. Yorke responded in a statement: "Playing in a country isn't the same as endorsing the government. Music, art and academia is about crossing borders not building them, about open minds not closed ones, about shared humanity, dialogue and freedom of expression."

== Live recordings ==
Grant Gee's footage from the Against Demons tour was used in the rockumentary Meeting People Is Easy, released in 1998. An article in Q claimed that, according to Yorke, Meeting People Is Easy is "a 94-minute message to any younger bands who might envy Radiohead's high-flying lifestyle. And that message is: 'Don't even think about it.'"

A recording of a 1994 performance at the London Astoria was released and is still available on DVD. There is also an album featuring performances of songs from their 2001 tour called I Might Be Wrong. More recently, Radiohead recorded a concert from their In Rainbows tour for NPR's All Songs Considered webcast hosted by Bob Boilen. This concert is available for free streaming on NPR's website and for free download as a podcast on iTunes.

The band has performed concerts for the MTV Network twice; once in 1997 for the Live from the 10 Spot series and once in 2003 for MTV2's $2 Bill series. The latter concert was also shown in its full length in Canadian movie theaters. They also performed live for the German concert series Rockpalast in June 2001 during their Kid A/Amnesiac tour. The concert was bootlegged and released unofficially on DVD in 2007.

On 13 August 2025, Radiohead released Hail to the Thief (Live Recordings 2003–2009), a 12-track album of performances recorded in London, Amsterdam, Buenos Aires and Dublin. The recordings were revisited while Yorke worked on the theatre production Hamlet Hail to the Thief, and were newly mixed by Ben Baptie and mastered by Matt Colton.
