= Kingmaker (disambiguation) =

A kingmaker is a person who can influence the selection of a monarch, without themself being a candidate for the throne, or a similar position of power.

Kingmaker may also refer to:

== Games ==
- Kingmaker (board game), a 1974 board game set in (English) Wars of the Roses
  - Kingmaker (video game), a 1994 strategy video game based on the board game
- Neverwinter Nights: Kingmaker, a 2005 expansion pack for BioWare's Neverwinter Nights
- Pathfinder: Kingmaker, a 2018 video game by Owlcat Games
- Kingmakers, upcoming video game

== Television ==
- King Maker (TVB), a 2012 TVB drama
- Kingmaker: The Change of Destiny, a 2020 South Korean television series
- "Kingmaker" (Law & Order), a 2006 episode of NBC drama
- "The Kingmaker" (Billions), a 2017 episode
- "The Kingmaker" (The Blacklist), a 2014 episode
- Good Night Show - King Maker, the first season of the TV series King Maker

== Music ==
- Kingmaker (band), British indie rock band
- Kingmaker (Tami Neilson album), a 2022 album
- Kingmaker (Pretty Maids album), a 2016 album
- "Kingmaker", a 2013 song by American band Megadeth from the album Super Collider
- "Kingmaker", a 2026 song by Maisie Peters and Julia Michaels

== In cinema ==
- The Kingmaker (film), a 2019 documentary film
- The King Maker, a 2005 Thai film
- Kingmaker (film), a 2022 South Korean political drama film

== Other uses ==
- The Kingmaker (audio drama) a 2006 Doctor Who audio drama
- King Maker, a 2010 urban fantasy novel by Maurice Broaddus
- Kingmaker (comics), Marvel character related to X-Men

== See also ==
- Kingmaker scenario, in games, a situation where a losing player has the power to select the winner
