= Creep (Radiohead song) =

1992 single

- 1993 EP reissue

Single by Radiohead

from the album Pablo Honey
- Released: 21 September 1992
- Recorded: 1992
- Studio: Chipping Norton (Oxfordshire, England)
- Genre: Alternative rock; grunge
- Length: 3:57 (album version); 4:01 (radio edit); 3:50 (live version); 4:19 (acoustic version)
- Label: Parlophone; Capitol
- Songwriters: Radiohead, (Albert Hammond, Michael Hazlewood wrote The Air That I Breathe on which it was based)
- Producers: Sean Slade; Paul Q. Kolderie

Radiohead singles chronology
"Creep" (1992)	"Anyone Can Play Guitar" (1993)

Music video
- "Creep" on YouTube

"Creep" is the debut single by the English rock band Radiohead, released on 21 September 1992 by EMI. It was included on Radiohead's debut album, Pablo Honey (1993). It features "blasts" of guitar noise and lyrics describing an obsessive unrequited attraction.

Radiohead had not planned to release "Creep", and recorded it at the suggestion of the producers, Sean Slade and Paul Q. Kolderie, while they were working on other songs. They took elements from the 1972 song "The Air That I Breathe" by Albert Hammond and Mike Hazlewood, which was later covered by the Hollies. Following legal action, Hammond and Hazlewood were credited as co-writers.

Kolderie convinced EMI to release "Creep" as a single. It was initially unsuccessful, but achieved radio play in Israel and became popular on American alternative rock radio. It was reissued in 1993 and became an international hit, likened to "slacker anthems" such as "Smells Like Teen Spirit" by Nirvana and "Loser" by Beck. Reviews were mostly positive. Rolling Stone later named "Creep" one of the greatest debut singles and included it in the 2021 and 2024 editions of its "500 Greatest Songs of All Time".

The success gave Radiohead freedom on their second album, The Bends (1995). EMI pressured Radiohead to match the success, which created tension. Radiohead departed from the style of "Creep" and grew weary of it, feeling it set narrow expectations of their music, and did not perform it for several years. Though they achieved greater commercial and critical success with later albums, "Creep" remains Radiohead's most successful single. It has been covered by numerous artists. In 2021, the Radiohead singer, Thom Yorke, released a remix with synthesisers and time-stretched acoustic guitar.

== Recording ==
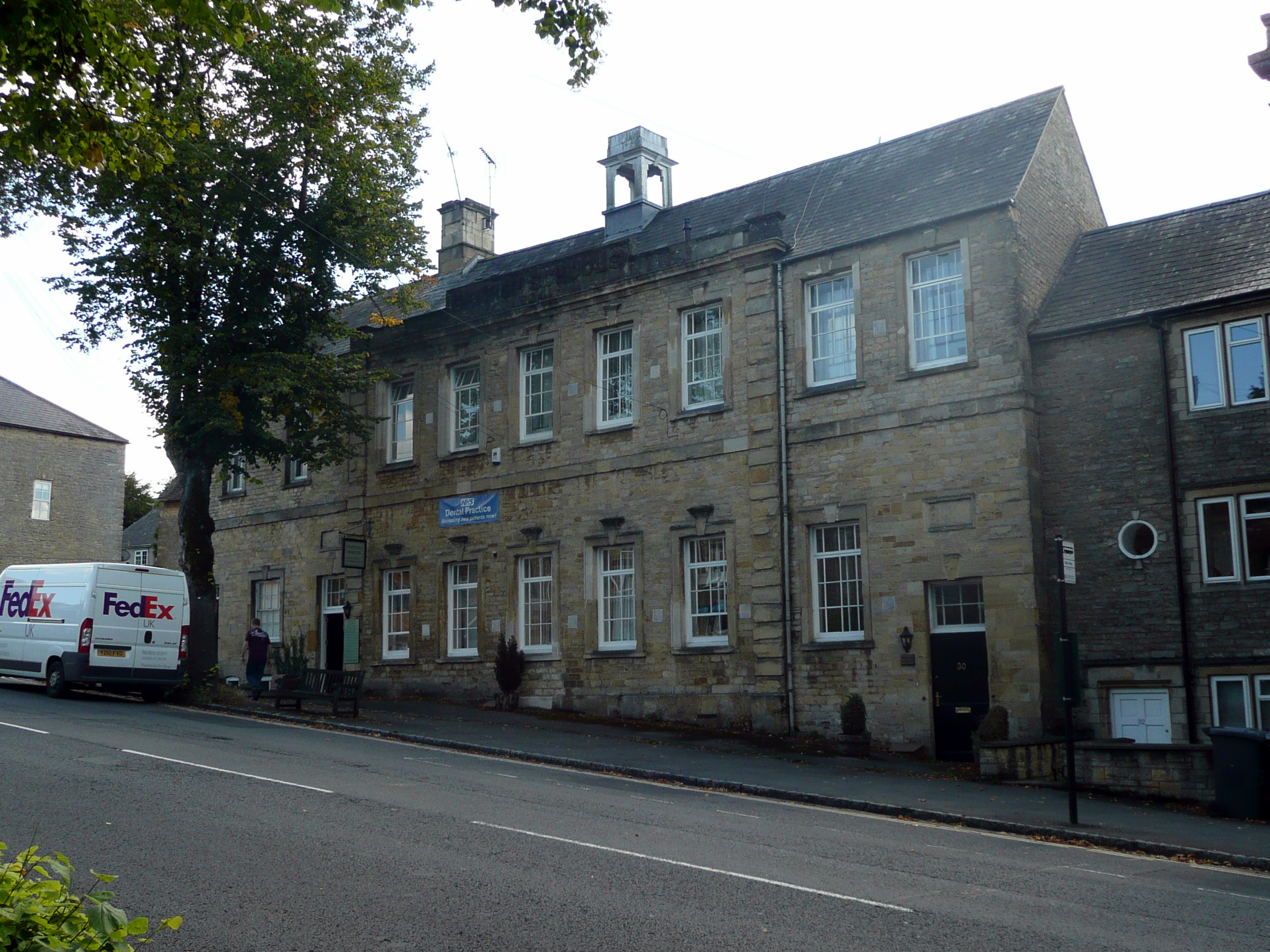
The former Chipping Norton Recording Studios, Oxfordshire

Radiohead formed in Oxfordshire in 1985 and signed a record contract with EMI in 1991. Their 1992 debut, the Drill EP, drew little attention. For their debut single, Radiohead hired the producers Sean Slade and Paul Q. Kolderie and recorded at Chipping Norton Recording Studios in Chipping Norton, Oxfordshire. They worked on the songs "Inside My Head" and "Lurgee", but without results.

Between rehearsals, Radiohead spontaneously performed another song, "Creep", which the singer, Thom Yorke, had written at the University of Exeter in the late 1980s. Yorke jokingly described it as their "Scott Walker song", which the producers misinterpreted. As they left the studio that night, Slade told Kolderie, "Too bad their best song's a cover."

After further recording sessions failed to produce results, Kolderie suggested Radiohead perform "Creep". After the first take, everyone in the studio burst into applause. Radiohead did not know they were being recorded; according to the drummer, Philip Selway, "The reason it sounds so powerful is because it's completely unselfconscious."

After Radiohead assured Kolderie that "Creep" was an original song, he called EMI and convinced them to release it as the single. According to Kolderie, "Everyone [at EMI] who heard 'Creep' just started going insane." Slade and Kolderie suggested that the lead guitarist, Jonny Greenwood, record a piano part. While mixing the song, Kolderie forgot to add the piano until the outro, but the band approved of the result.

== Lyrics ==
According to the critic Alex Ross, "Creep" has "obsessive" lyrics that depict the "self-lacerating rage" of an unrequited attraction. Greenwood said the lyrics were inspired by a woman who Yorke had "followed for a couple of days", and who unexpectedly attended a Radiohead performance. John Harris, then the Oxford correspondent for Melody Maker, said "Creep" was about a girl who frequented the upmarket Little Clarendon Street in Oxford. According to Harris, Yorke preferred the more bohemian Jericho, and expressed his discomfort using the lines "What the hell am I doing here / I don't belong here".

Asked if the lyrics were inspired by a real person who made him feel like a "creep", Yorke said: "Yeah. It was a pretty strange period in my life. When I was at college and stuff and I was really fucked up and wanted to leave and do proper things with my life like be in a rock band." Yorke said he was not happy with the lyrics, and thought they were "pretty crap". Asked about "Creep" in 1993, Yorke said: "I have a real problem being a man in the '90s... Any man with any sensitivity or conscience toward the opposite sex would have a problem. To actually assert yourself in a masculine way without looking like you're in a hard-rock band is a very difficult thing to do... It comes back to the music we write, which is not effeminate, but it's not brutal in its arrogance. It is one of the things I'm always trying: to assert a sexual persona and on the other hand trying desperately to negate it." Greenwood said "Creep" was in fact a happy song about "recognising what you are".

Radiohead recorded a censored version of "Creep" for radio, which replaces the line "so fucking special" with "so very special". Radiohead worried that issuing a censored version would be selling out, but decided it was acceptable since their idols Sonic Youth had done the same thing. Nonetheless, Greenwood said the British press "weren't impressed". During the recording session for the censored lyrics, Kolderie convinced Yorke to rewrite the first verse, saying he thought Yorke could do better.

== Composition ==
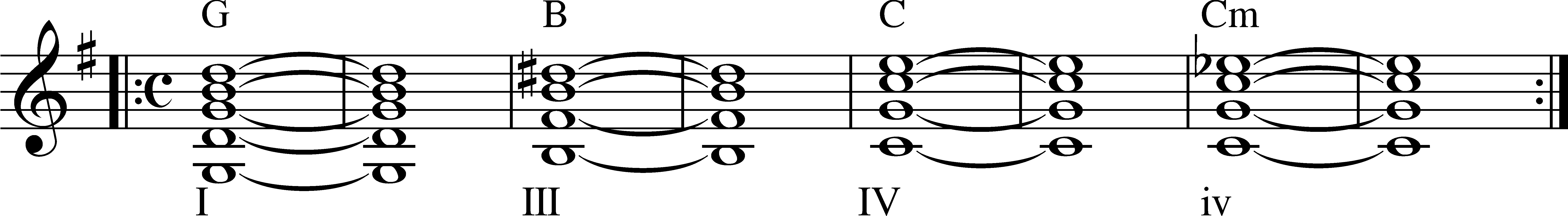
The ostinato features modal mixture, common tones between adjacent triads (B between G & B, C and G between C & Cm, see: chord letters), and an emphasis on subdominant harmony (IV = C in G major).

"Creep" sample

Like many Radiohead songs, "Creep" uses pivot notes, creating a "bittersweet, doomy" feeling. The G–B–C–Cm chord progression is repeated throughout, alternating between arpeggiated chords in the verses and last chorus and distorted power chords during the first two choruses. In G major, these may be interpreted as "I–V7/vi–IV–iv".

According to Guy Capuzzo, the ostinato mirrors the lyrics. For example, the "highest pitches of the ostinato form a prominent chromatic line that 'creeps' up, then down, involving scale degrees $\hat 5$– ♯$\hat 5$– $\hat 6$– ♭$\hat 6$....[while] ascend[ing], the lyrics strain towards optimism... Descend[ing], the subject sinks back into the throes of self-pity ... The guitarist's fretting hand mirrors this contour."

The middle eight originally featured a guitar solo from Greenwood. When the guitarist Ed O'Brien pointed out that the chord progression was the same as the 1972 song "The Air That I Breathe", Yorke wrote a new middle eight using the same vocal melody. According to Greenwood, "It was funny to us in a way, sort of feeding something like that into [it]. It's a bit of change."

Before the chorus, Jonny Greenwood plays three blasts of guitar noise ("dead notes" played by releasing fret-hand pressure and picking the strings). Greenwood said later: "I suppose the nauseating adolescent in me found it a bit wimpy and wanted to make it the opposite. Can't be having ballads!" O'Brien said: "That's the sound of Jonny trying to fuck the song up. He really didn't like it the first time we played it, so he tried spoiling it. And it made the song." Yorke said the sound was like the song was "slashing its wrists. Halfway through the song it suddenly starts killing itself off, which is the whole point of the song really. It's a real self-destruct song, there's a real self-destruction ethic in a lot of the things we do onstage." The producers boosted the sound so "it punched you in the face".

According to the Guardian critic Alexis Petridis, "Creep" has an "almost complete lack of resemblance" to Radiohead's later music. Yorke's later songwriting was less literal and personal.

== Music video ==
The "Creep" music video was directed by Brett Turnbull and filmed at the Venue, Oxford. For the video, Radiohead performed a free short concert, playing "Creep" several times. They donated proceeds from audience members to the Oxford magazine Curfew, which had covered their early work. In the audience was the electronic musician Four Tet, then a teenager, who years later supported Radiohead on tour and collaborated with Yorke.

== Release ==
Having a big hit like that wasn't in the game plan. We were giddy ... The first tour we sold out, and our American tour manager was going, "You know, I've toured with bands who have been doing this for seven, eight years, and this isn't usual." So it was really great on the one hand. But on the other hand we couldn't follow it up. The album had a couple of other songs that were OK, but we didn't have a body of work. We didn't know what we were doing.

— Ed O'Brien, guitarist

EMI released "Creep" as a single on 21 September 1992. BBC Radio 1 found it "too depressing" and excluded it from playlists. It reached number 78 on the UK singles chart, selling 6,000 copies. Asked about the response, Yorke said he was "absolutely horribly gutted, pissed off, self-righteous". Radiohead's follow-up singles "Anyone Can Play Guitar" and "Pop Is Dead" were also unsuccessful.

Later in 1992, "Creep" became a hit in Israel after the DJ Yoav Kutner began playing it on Israeli radio, having been introduced to it by an EMI representative. Radiohead quickly booked tour dates in Israel to capitalise on the success. "Creep" had similar success in New Zealand, Spain, and Scandinavia. The San Francisco alternative rock radio station KITS began playing "Creep" in December 1992. By Christmas, it had become the station's most requested song, leading the Los Angeles station KROQ-FM to add it to its rotation, where it also became successful. Radiohead's US record label, Capitol Records, quickly issued a promotional single to radio stations, including a censored version, and began promoting Radiohead.

"Creep" was included on Radiohead's debut album, Pablo Honey, released on 22 February 1993. By mid-1993, "Creep" had become a hit in America as a "slacker anthem" in the vein of "Smells Like Teen Spirit" by Nirvana and "Loser" by Beck. Radiohead were surprised by the success; Yorke told Melody Maker in 1993 that many journalists misunderstood it, asking him if it was a joke. In September 1993, Radiohead performed "Creep" on Late Night with Conan O'Brien as the show's first musical guests. The American band Weezer cited "Creep" as an influence on their 1994 debut album, with the guitars loud in the mix.

Following pressure from the music press, EMI and fans, Radiohead reissued "Creep" in the UK. It was released in the UK on 6 September 1993 and reached number seven, promoted with an appearance on the music programme Top of the Pops. In the US, "Creep" was aided by its appearance in a 1994 episode of the MTV animated series Beavis and Butt-Head. Capitol used the endorsement in a marketing campaign with the slogan "Beavis and Butt-Head say [Radiohead] don't suck". An acoustic version of "Creep", taken from a live performance on KROQ-FM on 13 July 1993, was included on Radiohead's 1994 EP My Iron Lung.

In June 2008, "Creep" re-entered the UK singles chart at number 37 after its inclusion on Radiohead: The Best Of. As of April 2019, in the UK, it was the most streamed song released in 1992, with 10.1 million streams. On 23 April 2024, "Creep" surpassed 1 billion views on YouTube. It remains Radiohead's most successful single.

== Critical reception ==
Reviewing "Creep" for Melody Maker in September 1992, Sharon O'Connell described it as "a stormer, a perfect monster of a malevolent pop song ... Like all the best pop, it gently strokes the nape of your neck before it digs the bread knife in. Aggression is rarely this delicious." Larry Flick of Billboard wrote: "Minimal cut, boosted with just a touch of noise, relies mainly on an appropriately languid, melodic vocal (which also vaults into Bono-esque falsetto range) to pull the whole thing together." He predicted it could be popular on alternative rock radio and college radio.

Troy J. Augusto from Cash Box said "Creep" was "for all those of the post-pimple set who just can't find their way in this big ol' world. Vocalist Thom Yorke is our too-self-aware hero who won't let a little disillusionment keep him down. Song's hook is the razor-sharp guitar play that frames Yorke's gnashing of teeth." Marisa Fox of Entertainment Weekly wrote that "Creep" was "the ultimate neurotic teen anthem", marrying the self-consciousness of the Smiths, the vocals and guitar of U2, and the "heavy but crunchy pop" of the Cure. A reviewer from People called it a "startling pop song" and a "gripping descent into love's dark regrets". Steve Lamacq from Select said it was "spectacularly under-achieving (but beautifully self-effacing)".

When "Creep" was reissued in the UK in September 1993, it was named the week's best single by Smash Hits, NME and Melody Maker. Tom Doyle of Smash Hits praised the lyrics, "crunching" guitar and "delirious" chorus, while Edwin Pouncey of NME wrote that it had "clout, class and truth proudly branded on its forearm". Martin Aston of Music Week gave it four out of five, describing it as "stunning". In 1995, Chuck Eddy of Spin wrote that he had initially dismissed "Creep" as a "wussy David Bowie cabaret ballad with corny Jesus and Mary Chain lawnmower guitar snags stuck in there", but had come to love it, especially the guitar work and falsetto.

=== Later reviews ===
According to the journalist Alex Ross in 2001, "the grandeur of its chords ... in particular, its regal turn from G major to B major" separated "Creep" from the grunge rock of the period: "The lyrics may be saying, 'I'm a creep,' but the music is saying, 'I am majestic.'" Stephen Thomas Erlewine wrote in 2001 that "Creep" achieved "a rare power that is both visceral and intelligent". In 2003, the Independent critic Andy Gill wrote that "those jarring, splenetic razor-slashes of distorted guitar ... kick the song up several gears, sparking its smouldering self-disgust into something closer to cathartic rage". Reviewing the Pablo Honey reissue for Uncut in 2009, Sam Richards wrote that "Creep" was "the runt of Radiohead's litter: the over-bearing self-pity, those wheedling arpeggios... Even Jonny's clink-clunk guitar spasms signposting the chorus now feel horribly mannered." Richards said there were many better songs on Pablo Honey.

In 2007, VH1 ranked "Creep" the 31st-greatest song of the 1990s. In 2020, The Guardian named it the 34th-greatest Radiohead song, and Rolling Stone named it the 16th-greatest debut single. The Rolling Stone journalist Andy Greene noted that though Radiohead had followed "Creep" with "some of the most innovative and acclaimed music of the past 30 years", it remained their most famous song. It was included in the 2021 and 2024 editions of Rolling Stone's "500 Greatest Songs of All Time".

== Legacy ==
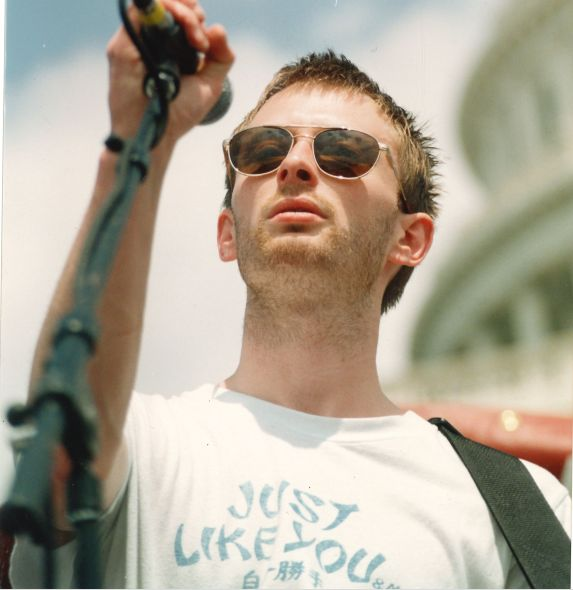
Thom Yorke in 1998

Following the release of Pablo Honey, Radiohead spent two years touring in support of Belly, PJ Harvey and James. They performed "Creep" at every show, and came to resent it. O'Brien recalled: "We seemed to be living out the same four and a half minutes of our lives over and over again. It was incredibly stultifying." Yorke told Rolling Stone in 1993: "It's like it's not our song any more ... It feels like we're doing a cover." During Radiohead's first American tour, audience members would scream for "Creep", then leave after it was performed. Yorke said the success "gagged" them and almost caused them to break up; they felt they were being judged on a single song. Radiohead were determined to move on rather than "repeat that small moment of [our] lives forevermore".

O'Brien believed EMI would have dropped Radiohead from their contract had "Creep" not been successful. The success meant that Radiohead were not in debt to EMI, and so had more freedom on their second album, The Bends (1995). The album title, a term for decompression sickness, references Radiohead's rapid rise to fame with "Creep"; Yorke said "we just came up too fast". John Leckie, who produced The Bends, recalled that EMI hoped for a single "even better" than "Creep" but that Radiohead "didn't even know what was good about it in the first place". Radiohead wrote "My Iron Lung" in response, with the lines: "This is our new song / just like the last one / a total waste of time". Yorke said in 1995: "People have defined our emotional range with that one song, 'Creep'. I saw reviews of 'My Iron Lung' that said it was just like 'Creep'. When you're up against things like that, it's like: 'Fuck you.' These people are never going to listen."

In January 1996, Radiohead surpassed the UK chart performance of "Creep" with the Bends single "Street Spirit", which reached number five. This, alongside the critical success of The Bends, established that Radiohead were not one-hit wonders. Over the following years, Radiohead departed further from the style of "Creep". During the promotion for their third album, OK Computer (1997), Yorke became hostile when "Creep" was mentioned and refused requests to play it, telling a Montréal audience: "Fuck off, we're tired of it." He dismissed fans demanding it as "anally retarded". After the tour, Radiohead did not perform "Creep" until the encore of their 2001 homecoming concert at South Park, Oxford, when a keyboard malfunction halted a performance of another song.

In a surprise move, Radiohead performed "Creep" as the opening song of their headline performance at the 2009 Reading Festival. They did not perform it again until their 2016 tour for A Moon Shaped Pool, when a fan spent the majority of a concert shouting for it. Radiohead decided to play it to "see what the reaction is, just to see how it feels". They performed "Creep" again during the encore of their headline performance at Glastonbury Festival that year, surprising the audience. The Guardian critic Jazz Monroe wrote: "In the end, the band's disavowal of the song sent its credibility full circle. Nowadays, 'Creep' is a joke, but we're all blissfully in on it."

In 2017, O'Brien acknowledged that audiences wanted to hear "Creep" but that Radiohead generally did not play it "because you don't want it to feel like show business". In the same interview, Yorke said: "It can be cool sometimes, but other times I want to stop halfway through and be like, 'Nah, this isn't happening'." In a 2020 interview, O'Brien was dismissive of Pablo Honey but cited "Creep" as the "standout track". He said later "'Creep' is like an aberration — it wasn't really a Radiohead song. It doesn't feel like part of the canon." In 2023, Yorke said that his vocal range had dropped with age and that he found "Creep" difficult to sing.

== 2021 remix ==
In July 2021, Yorke released a remix, "Creep (Very 2021 Rmx)". It is based on a time-stretched version of the acoustic version of "Creep", extending it to nine minutes, with "eerie" synthesisers. Yorke contributed the remix to a show by the Japanese fashion designer Jun Takahashi, who provided artwork and an animated music video. Vogue described the remix as "haunting and spare", and Classic Rock described it as "woozy" and "discombobulating". Rolling Stone said it was a fitting track for the COVID-19 pandemic, when "a sense of time is warped and singular moments can seem both fleeting and drawn out simultaneously".

== Covers ==
The Pretenders covered "Creep" in live shows in 1995 and released a performance on the live album The Isle of View (1995). Vice wrote that the singer, Chrissie Hynde, added a vulnerability that took the song "from loser anthem to tender ballad, imbued with new sentiment". The Canadian singer-songwriter Alanis Morissette covered "Creep" in 1996, while Radiohead were supporting her on tour. The Swedish singer Timo Räisänen covered "Creep" in 2008 on the game show På spåret, and released a version on his 2008 covers album And Then There Was Timo. Räisänen's version includes a march-like chorus. That April, the American musician Prince covered "Creep" at the Coachella Valley Music and Arts Festival. A bootleg recording was shared online, but removed at Prince's request. After being informed of the situation in an interview, Yorke said: "Well, tell him to unblock it. It's our song."

In 2009, the American singer-songwriter Daniel Mustard covered "Creep" on the Opie and Anthony radio show. Vice said his version, performed with an acoustic guitar and "raspy, weathered voice", felt "spontaneous" and made "Creep" into a "powerful, almost angry song". A cover by the choir group the Scala & Kolacny Brothers was used in the trailer for the 2010 film The Social Network, creating a trend for trailers using eerie, slowed-down versions of pop songs. In 2011, the Canadian actor Jim Carrey covered "Creep" at Arlene's Grocery in New York City.

In March 2011, members of the Guardian newspaper staff, including the editor, Alan Rusbridger, recorded a cover of "Creep" as the Radio Eds. The following week, the Guardian published a review by the Radiohead bassist, Colin Greenwood, who wrote: "Having heard quite a few covers of 'Creep' ... this is definitively one of them. I thought the Radio Eds dispatched it with pitiless ease." That September, the Canadian actor Jim Carrey covered "Creep" at Arlene's Grocery in New York City. A version by Diego Luna appears in the 2014 animated film The Book of Life. According to the director, Jorge Gutierrez, Radiohead told him the film was the first to use "Creep" "exactly how it's supposed to be used" and that "it's for a teenager who feels like he doesn't fit in".

In 2023, Pentatonix covered "Creep" on The Masked Singer and released a studio version the night after their unmasking. That November, the Australian musician Elly-May Barnes released a cover as the first single from her debut album, No Good. Barnes, who has cerebral palsy, said it was "just a really beautiful song to relate to if you're feeling like you're in a world that's just not made for you". Other artists who have covered "Creep" include Postmodern Jukebox, Korn, Weezer, Damien Rice, Amanda Palmer, Moby, Kelly Clarkson, Arlo Parks, Olivia Rodrigo and Ernest.

== Copyright infringement ==
The chord progression and melody in "Creep" are similar to those of the 1972 song "The Air That I Breathe", written by Albert Hammond and Mike Hazlewood and later covered by the Hollies. After Rondor Music, the publisher of "The Air That I Breathe", took legal action, Hammond and Hazlewood received cowriting credits and a percentage of the royalties. Hammond said he and Hazlewood accepted only a small percentage as Radiohead were honest about having reused their composition.

In January 2018, the American singer Lana Del Rey said on Twitter that Radiohead were taking legal action against her for allegedly plagiarising "Creep" on her 2017 track "Get Free", and had asked for 100% of publishing royalties instead of Del Rey's offer of 40%. She denied that "Creep" had inspired "Get Free". Radiohead's publisher, Warner Chappell Music, confirmed it was seeking songwriting credits for "all writers" of "Creep", but denied that a lawsuit had been brought or that Radiohead had demanded 100% of royalties. In March, Del Rey told an audience: "My lawsuit's over. I guess I can sing that song any time I want." The writing credits for "Get Free" were not updated on the database of the American Society of Composers, Authors, and Publishers.

== Track listings ==
All tracks are written by Radiohead. (Note: Except "Creep" composed by Radiohead, Albert Hammond and Mike Hazlewood; Thom Yorke is credited as the lyricist of "Creep", "Lurgee", "Prove Yourself", "Blow Out", "You" and "Vegetable" on the liner notes of Pablo Honey.)

- UK release (CD, cassette, 12-inch) (Note: The same tracks are played on both sides of the cassette tape.) (Note: The 12 and 7-inch vinyls contain two tracks on each side.)
- Australian release (CD, cassette)
- European release (CD)
1. "Creep" – 3:53
2. "Lurgee" – 3:05
3. "Inside My Head" – 3:07
4. "Million Dollar Question" – 3:10
- US single (cassette)
1. "Creep" – 3:53
2. "Faithless, the Wonder Boy" – 4:14
- US jukebox single (7-inch) (Note: Track 1 is on side A of the 7-inch vinyl and track 2 is on side B.)
1. "Creep" – 4:00
2. "Anyone Can Play Guitar" – 3:37
- French limited edition (CD)
1. "Creep" – 3:53
2. "The Bends" (live) – 3:58
3. "Prove Yourself" (live) – 2:28
4. "Creep" (live) – 3:50
- UK reissue (CD, cassette, 7-inch)
- Japanese release (CD)
1. "Creep" (album version) – 3:58
2. "Yes I Am" – 4:24
3. "Blow Out" (remix) – 4:18
4. "Inside My Head" (live) – 3:06
- UK limited edition (12-inch)
1. "Creep" (acoustic) – 4:19
2. "You" (live) – 3:39
3. "Vegetable" (live) – 3:07
4. "Killer Cars" (live) – 2:17
- Dutch release and European reissue (CD)
1. "Creep" (album version) – 3:58
2. "Yes I Am" – 4:25
3. "Inside My Head" (live) – 3:07
4. "Creep" (acoustic) – 4:19
- French reissue (CD)
1. "Creep" – 3:55
2. "The Bends" – 3:58

== Credits and personnel ==
Radiohead

- Thom Yorke – vocals, guitar
- Jonny Greenwood – lead guitar, piano
- Ed O'Brien – guitar
- Colin Greenwood – bass
- Philip Selway – drums

Technical

- Sean Slade – production, engineering; mixing
- Paul Q. Kolderie – production, engineering; mixing

Artwork

- Icon – design
- Steve Gullick – photography
- Maurice Burns – painting ("Craigavon Under Age Drinkers Rule")

== Charts ==
=== Weekly charts ===
Weekly chart performance for "Creep"
Chart (1992–2025)	Peak position
Australia (ARIA)	6
Austria (Ö3 Austria Top 40)	15
Belgium (Ultratop 50 Flanders)	37
Belgium (Ultratop 50 Wallonia)	8
Canada Top Singles (RPM)	30
Canada Digital Song Sales (Billboard)	22
Denmark (Tracklisten)	18
Europe (Eurochart Hot 100)	42
France (SNEP)	17
Germany (GfK)	50
Global 200 (Billboard)	26
Greece International (IFPI)	99
Ireland (IRMA)	13
Israel (Israeli Singles Chart)	7
Lithuania (AGATA)	71
Netherlands (Dutch Top 40)	17
Netherlands (Single Top 100)	13
New Zealand (Recorded Music NZ)	19
Norway (VG-lista)	3
Sweden (Sverigetopplistan)	35
Switzerland (Schweizer Hitparade)	39
UK Singles (Official Charts)	7
UK Airplay (Music Week)	32
UK Independent (Official Charts)	4
US Billboard Hot 100	34
US Alternative Airplay (Billboard)	2
US Hot Rock & Alternative Songs (Billboard)	6
US Mainstream Rock Airplay (Billboard)	20
US Pop Airplay (Billboard)	39
US Cash Box Top 100	37

=== Year-end charts ===
1993 year-end chart performance for "Creep"
Chart (1993)	Position
Australia (ARIA)	91
Israel (Israeli Singles Chart)	11
Netherlands (Single Top 100)	97
US Modern Rock Tracks (Billboard)	4

1994 year-end chart performance for "Creep"
Chart (1994)	Position
Australia (ARIA)	94

1996 year-end chart performance for "Creep"
Chart (1996)	Position
Belgium (Ultratop 50 Wallonia)	30
France (SNEP)	94

2012 year-end chart performance for "Creep"
Chart (2012)	Position
France (SNEP)	191

2023 year-end chart performance for "Creep"
Chart (2023)	Position
Global 200 (Billboard)	176

2024 year-end chart performance for "Creep"
Chart (2024)	Position
Global 200 (Billboard)	137

2025 year-end chart performance for "Creep"
Chart (2025)	Position
Belgium (Ultratop 50 Flanders)	152
Belgium (Ultratop 50 Wallonia)	194
France (SNEP)	169
Global 200 (Billboard)	43
UK Singles (OCC)	64

== Certifications and sales ==
Region	Certification	Certified units/sales
Australia (ARIA)	Gold	35,000^{^}
Canada (Music Canada)	7× Platinum	560,000^{‡}
Denmark (IFPI Danmark)	Platinum	90,000^{‡}
Italy (FIMI)	3× Platinum	300,000^{‡}
New Zealand (RMNZ)	6× Platinum	180,000^{‡}
Portugal (AFP)	3× Platinum	120,000^{‡}
South Korea (Gaon)	—	355,724
Spain (Promusicae)	2× Platinum	120,000^{‡}
United Kingdom (BPI)	5× Platinum	3,000,000^{‡}
Streaming
Chile (Profovi)	Gold	13,000,000
Greece (IFPI Greece)	2× Platinum	4,000,000^{†}
^{^} Shipments figures based on certification alone.^{‡} Sales+streaming figures based on certification alone.^{†} Streaming-only figures based on certification alone.

== Bibliography ==
- Clover, Joshua (2009). 1989: Bob Dylan Didn't Have This to Sing About. University of California Press. ISBN 978-0520944640.
- Forbes, Brandon W. and George A. Reisch (2009). Radiohead and Philosophy: Fitter Happier More Deductive. Open Court Publishing. ISBN 978-0812696646.
- Jones, Carys Wyn (2005). "The Aura of Authenticity: Perceptions of Honesty, Sincerity, and Truth in 'Creep' and 'Kid A'". In Joseph Tate (ed.). The Music and Art of Radiohead. Ashgate. ISBN 0754639797.
- Randall, Mac. Exit Music: The Radiohead Story. Delta, 2000. ISBN 0-385-33393-5
- Reising, Russell (2005). Speak To Me: The Legacy Of Pink Floyd's Dark Side Of The Moon. Ashgate Publishing, Ltd. ISBN 0754640191.
- Reynolds, Tom (2008). Touch Me, I'm Sick: The 52 Creepiest Love Songs You've Ever Heard. Chicago Review Press. pp. 47–51. ISBN 9781556527531.
