= 1975 Origins Award winners =

The following are the winners of the 2nd annual (1975) Origins Award, presented at Origins 1976:

== Charles Roberts Awards ==
Category	Winner	Company	Designer(s)
Best Professional Game	Kingmaker	Philmar/AH	
Best Amateur Game	La Bataille de la Moscowa	Martial	Lawrence Groves
Best Professional Magazine	Strategy & Tactics	SPI	
Best Amateur Magazine	Jagdpanther		

== Adventure Gaming Hall of Fame Inductee ==
- James F. Dunnigan
