= Lee Guo-Lin =

Hong Kong actor

Joseph Lee Kwok-lun
- 李國麟
- Born: May 9, 1954 (age 72); British Hong Kong
- Education: Police Children's School; Salesian English School; St. Mary's Church Mok Hing Yiu College
- Occupation: Actor
- Years active: 1975–present
- Spouse: Angel (m. 1997)
- Children: 1

Joseph Lee Guo-Lin (Chinese: 李國麟; born 9 May 1954) is a Hong Kong actor. He was formerly a contracted artiste of TVB and is a member of the HK Performing Artistes Guild.

== Early life ==
Lee was born in British Hong Kong and grew up in the Wan Chai district on Hong Kong Island. He has two younger brothers and one younger sister. During his childhood, he lived in the married police quarters on Jaffe Road and Lockhart Road opposite the former Wan Chai Police Station.

He attended Police Children's School, where he was a classmate of actor Simon Yam. He later studied at Salesian English School before transferring to St. Mary's Church Mok Hing Yiu College, then located in So Kon Po, where he completed his secondary education in 1974.

After obtaining passes in five subjects in the Hong Kong Certificate of Education Examination, Lee considered joining the police force. However, his father, who was a police officer, opposed the idea, believing that the profession carried significant risks. Instead, he encouraged Lee to pursue a career in banking.

In 1974, Lee applied for the fourth training class of the TVB Artiste Training Programme together with four friends. Among the five applicants, he was the only one accepted.

== Career ==
Lee enrolled in the fourth training class of the TVB Artiste Training Programme from 1974 to 1975. His classmates included Johnnie To, Lau Shiu-yu, Margaret Chung, and Poon Ka-tak. During his training period, he developed a close friendship with To.

Lee made his television debut in the 1975 TVB drama The Last Romance. During the golden age of Hong Kong television in the 1970s and 1980s, he appeared in numerous TVB productions, including The Good, the Bad and the Ugly, The Bund, and The Legend of Chu Liuxiang.

In 1990, Lee became involved in a legal dispute arising from a personal relationship. Following the conclusion of the case, he temporarily left Hong Kong and worked in Malaysia for more than two years, filming direct-to-video productions. He returned to TVB in 1995 when producer Lee Tim-shing invited him to join the cast of the remake of The Return of the Condor Heroes.

Having spent more than three decades with TVB, Lee was rarely cast as a leading actor and was best known for his supporting roles. During the early stages of his career, he frequently portrayed antagonists and villains. Beginning in the late 2000s, he successfully transitioned into comedic and character roles and became a regular collaborator of producer Lau Ka-ho.

In 2009 and 2011, Lee received nominations for Best Supporting Actor at the TVB Anniversary Awards for his performances as Ma Yuen-chi in Beyond the Realm of Conscience and "Bright Hermit" Luk Chun-kwong in Forensic Heroes III, respectively. On both occasions, he advanced to the final five nominees.

Among his other notable roles were Alex Pao in War of the Genders, Shen Gongbao in Gods of Honour, Nanshan Laolao in Find the Light, Man Kok-kei in Virtues of Harmony, Shek Tai-kei in Virtues of Harmony II, Chuk Moon-tin in The Charm Beneath, Chiang Tin-hung in A Watchdog's Tale, Ting Choi-wong in Can't Buy Me Love, Lo Sham in The Other Truth, Liu Bei in Three Kingdoms RPG, and Yeung Chi-shan in King Maker.

=== Film career ===
In addition to his television work, Lee has also been active in the Hong Kong film industry since 1981. Unlike his television roles, he frequently portrayed police officers and authority figures in films.

Earlier in his career, Lee established the "Kamikaze Stunt Team" and worked as a stunt performer. He also served as a stunt double for actor Andy Lau. After witnessing fellow stunt performers suffer serious injuries in workplace accidents, he decided to disband the stunt team, citing concerns about the risks involved in the profession.

== Personal life ==
Lee married his longtime non-celebrity girlfriend, Angel, in 1997. Prior to their marriage, the couple experienced a period of separation before later reconciling. According to Lee, the relationship survived despite complications arising from a subsequent relationship and related financial disputes, for which he credited his future wife with providing support.

Their daughter, Cherie Lee (Lee Yuen-ling), was born in 2002.

Between 1997 and 2000, Lee suffered substantial investment losses and accumulated significant debt. He subsequently resolved his financial difficulties through a debt restructuring programme and eventually repaid all outstanding liabilities.

== Filmography ==
=== Television (TVB) ===
| Year | Title | Role |
|---|---|---|
| 1975 | Dream of the Qing Court (清宮殘夢) | — |
| 1975 | Fragments (片斷) | Tourist |
| 1975 | Folklore – The Fragrant Silk Ribbon (香羅帶) | Song Peng |
| 1975 | Folklore – The Clever Thief Comes (妙賊我來也) | Servant |
| 1976 | Folklore – The Embroidered Robe (繡襦記) | — |
| 1976 | The Big Dipper (北斗星) | Social Worker |
| 1976 | The Book and the Sword (書劍恩仇錄) | Imperial Guard |
| 1977 | The Good, the Bad and the Ugly (家變) | Chu Man-ching |
| 1977 | Lu Xiaofeng: Before and After the Duel (陸小鳳之決戰前後) | — |
| 1978 | The Heaven Sword and Dragon Saber (倚天屠龍記) | He Zudao |
| 1978 | The Mighty Sword (一劍鎮神州) | Yam Pak-kwong |
| 1979 | The Proud Twins (絕代雙驕) | Jiang Yulang |
| 1979 | Chor Lau-heung (楚留香) | Zhang Baiming |
| 1980 | The Bund | Cheung Tat-sang |
| 1980 | The Shell Game | Gambler |
| 1980 | New CID | Ng Sai-cheung |
| 1980 | The Couples (山水有相逢) | Television Station Employee |
| 1981 | The Misadventure of Zoo (流氓皇帝) | Zhan Beng-dao |
| 1981 | The Lonely Hunter (過客) | — |
| 1981 | Twin Brothers (無雙譜) | Niu Baiye |
| 1981 | The Legend of Wonder Lady (女黑俠木蘭花) | — |
| 1981 | Fire Phoenix (火鳳凰) | Follower of Ni Guangsheng |
| 1981 | Rich and Honourable (富貴榮華) | Choi |
| 1982 | Crazy Romance (顛鳳狂龍) | — |
| 1982 | The Seventh Floor (飛越十八層) | Mr. Chiu |
| 1982 | Demi-Gods and Semi-Devils | Disciple of the Shenlong Sect |
| 1982 | The Rough Ride (荊途) | — |
| 1982 | Love and Passion (萬水千山總是情) | Student |
| 1982 | The Emissary | Yau Kwok-kei (Detective) |
| 1983 | The Awakening Story (奔向太陽) | — |
| 1983 | The Legend of the Condor Heroes | Tan Chuduan |
| 1983 | Policewoman (警花出更) | — |
| 1983 | The Rough Detective (神探霹靂) | — |
| 1983 | The Confidant (夾心人) | Wong Tat-choi |
| 1984 | The Foundation (決戰玄武門) | Sang Kwan |
| 1984 | Family Close Door (閉門一家親) | Bi Erchang |
| 1984 | Love and Passion (儂本多情) | Tsui Yuen-mung |
| 1984 | The Duke of Mount Deer | Mu Jiansheng |
| 1984 | Master Wong (寶芝林) | Wong Chun-yi |
| 1984 | Hong Kong Night (香江花月夜) | Kong Yuk-lun |
| 1984 | Modern Detective (摩登幹探) | — |
| 1985 | The Family (武林世家) | Cheung Wai |
| 1985 | The Challenge | Supervisor of Tse Bik-wa |
| 1985 | Take Care, Your Majesty (皇上保重) | Fu Heng |
| 1985 | The Flying Fox of Snowy Mountain | Xu Zheng |
| 1985 | The Yang's Saga | Yeung Sam-long (Yeung Yin-on) |
| 1986 | CID Police (神勇CID) | Ching Chun |
| 1986 | Heroic Story (英雄故事) | To Chun |
| 1986 | The Heavenly Sword (真命天子) | Ao Fung |
| 1986 | Diamond Bachelor (鑽石王老五) | Kei Shing-chun |
| 1986 | General Father, General Son (薛丁山征西) | Dou Yat-fu |
| 1987 | Cheng Cheng-kung | Cheng Sai-chung |
| 1988 | Police Cadet '88 | — |
| 1988 | Final Verdict (誓不低頭) | Tang Tung-leung |
| 1988 | Shaolin and Wing Chun | Hung Man-ting |
| 1988 | Righteousness (義薄雲天) | — |
| 1988 | Taiping Heavenly Kingdom | Feng Yunshan |
| 1989 | King's Gambit (決戰皇城) | Emperor Gaozong of Song |
| 1989 | The Good Old Days (摘星的女人) | — |
| 1989 | Family Squad (串燒冤家) | — |
| 1990 | Three in a Family (同居三人組) | Wu Chi-yung |
| 1990 | The Husband's Loss (失職丈夫) | |
| 1990 | Proud Sword (傲劍春秋) | — |
| 1991 | Dance of Danger (危情共舞) | — |
| 1991 | The Breaking Point (命運迷宮) | Ma Cheung |
| 1992 | Greed of Man (我為錢狂) | — |
| 1992 | File of Justice (壹號皇庭) | Cheung Bing |
| 1992 | The Silver Tycoon (夢斷銀城) | — |
| 1993 | Outburst (妙探出更) | — |
| 1993 | Fatal City (驚心都市) | — |
| 1995 | Justice Pao (包青天) | Gongsun Wen |
| 1995 | The Condor Heroes 95 (神鵰俠侶) | Fung Mok-fung |
| 1995 | Detective Investigation Files II (刑事偵緝檔案II) | Lam Ka-wing |
| 1996 | A Kindred Spirit (真情) | Lee Tak-fai |
| 1996 | Cold Blood Warm Heart (天地男兒) | Yuen Man-tai |
| 1996 | ICAC Investigators 1996 (廉政行動1996) – "Crossing the Border" (飛越關卡) | Wong Man-cheuk |
| 1996 | The Hitman Chronicles (大刺客) – "Yu Rang Strikes the Robe" (豫讓擊衣) | Zhao Xiangzi (趙襄子) |
| 1996 | Strange Tales from a Chinese Studio (聊齋) – "The Heroine Tian Lang" (俠女田郎) | Lin Er |
| 1996 | Strange Tales from a Chinese Studio (聊齋) – "Qiuyue Returns to Life" (秋月還陽) | Magistrate Peng / Judge Peng |
| 1996 | Journey to the West (西遊記) | Jing River Dragon King |
| 1997 | When a Woman Loves a Man (當女人愛上男人) | — |
| 1997 | Untraceable Evidence (迷離檔案) | — |
| 1997 | Demi-Gods and Semi-Devils (天龍八部) | Kumozhi (鳩摩智) |
| 1997 | Forensic Heroes (鑑證實錄) | To Chi-chun |
| 1998 | Secret of Tai O (大澳的天空) | — |
| 1998 | Journey to the West II (西遊記(貳)) | Yeung Chung-pak |
| 1998 | A Loving Spirit (外父唔怕做) | Ng Bo-kong |
| 1998 | Rural Hero (離島特警) | Koo Wai-fu |
| 1999 | Forensic Heroes II (鑑證實錄II) | To Chi-chun |
| 1999 | Detective Investigation Files IV (刑事偵緝檔案IV) | Chiu Hon-wa |
| 1999 | I Am a Policeman (吾係差人) | — |
| 2000 | At the Threshold of an Era II (創世紀II天地有情) | Hui Tai-ho |
| 2000 | War of the Genders (男親女愛) | Alex Pao (鮑一柱) |
| 2000 | Lady Yang (楊貴妃) | Guo Ziyi |
| 2000 | Return of the Cuckoo (十月初五的月光) | Santos |
| 2000 | Crimson Sabre (碧血劍) | Yu Zhenzi |
| 2001 | A Step into the Past (勇往直前) | — |
| 2001 | Gods of Honour (封神榜) | Shen Gongbao (申公豹) |
| 2001 | The Heaven Sword and Dragon Saber (倚天屠龍記) | Yu Daiyan (俞岱岩) |
| 2001 | The Awakening Story (婚前昏後) | Wong Pak-lun |
| 2001–2002 | Virtues of Harmony (皆大歡喜（古裝版）) | Man Kok-kei |
| 2002 | Legal Entanglement (法網伊人) | Mr. Man |
| 2002 | Take My Word for It (情事緝私檔案) | — |
| 2002 | Eternal Happiness (再生緣) | Man Kan-tung |
| 2002 | Square Pegs (戇夫成龍) | Mr. Lo (School Teacher) |
| 2002 | Treasure Raiders (蕭十一郎) | — |
| 2003 | Find the Light (天子尋龍) | Nanshan Laolao (南山姥姥) |
| 2003 | Witness to a Prosecution II (洗冤錄II) | Xiahou Guodong |
| 2003 | Survivor's Law (律政新人王) | Lee Ming-kit |
| 2003–2005 | Virtues of Harmony II (皆大歡喜（時裝版）) | Shek Tai-kei |
| 2003 | Triumph in the Skies (衝上雲霄) | Chan Hak-ming (Episode 4) |
| 2003 | Life Begins at Forty (花樣中年) | Szeto Mo-lung |
| 2004 | Hard Fate (翡翠戀曲) | Lawyer Yeung |
| 2004 | ICAC Investigators 2004 (廉政行動2004) | Tam Chuen ("Abuse of Power") |
| 2004 | Shine on You (青出於藍) | Au-yeung Tak-kwong |
| 2004 | Virtues of Harmony II (皆大歡喜（時裝版）) | God of Longevity (Episode 379) |
| 2005 | Blossom in Heart (心花放) | Father of the Lam Siblings |
| 2005 | The Academy (學警雄心) | Pang Ho-leung (Pang Sir) |
| 2005 | Scholar Meets Soldier (秀才遇著兵) | Lo Kong |
| 2005 | Women on the Run (窈窕熟女) | Chai Kwok-yung |
| 2005 | The Charm Beneath (胭脂水粉) | Chuk Moon-tin |
| 2005 | Life Made Simple (阿旺新傳) | Lui Heung-tung |
| 2005 | The Herbalist's Manual (本草藥王) | Hui San |
| 2006 | A Pillow Case of Mystery (施公奇案) | Shi Lang (施琅) |
| 2006 | La Femme Desperado (女人唔易做) | Jimmy |
| 2006 | Forensic Heroes (法證先鋒) | Leung Hing-chung |
| 2006 | Dicey Business (賭場風雲) | Tam Yat-muk |
| 2007 | The Brink of Law (突圍行動) | Sung Kam-yuen |
| 2007 | My Sassy Mother-in-Law (我外母唔係人) | Erlang Shen / Yee Gor / Sei Gor |
| 2007 | Heart of Greed (溏心風暴) | Tai Kin-hei (Big Foot Eight) |
| 2007 | On the First Beat (學警出更) | Pang Ho-leung (Pang Sir) |
| 2007 | Devil's Disciples (強劍) | Lam Yiu-sang |
| 2007 | Fathers and Sons (爸爸閉翳) | Ma Yun-cheung |
| 2007 | The Drive of Life (歲月風雲) | Fong Yiu-chung |
| 2007 | ICAC Investigators 2007 (廉政行動2007) | Chu Sir ("Express Delivery Behind Bars") |
| 2007 | The Ultimate Crime Fighter (通天幹探) | Lee Chi-chiu (Chiu Sir) |
| 2007 | Building Blocks of Life (建築有情天) | Chan Wai-chiu |
| 2008 | To Love with No Regrets (秀才愛上兵) | Tong Tai-hoi |
| 2008 | D.I.E. (古靈精探) | Szeto Bing (Ben) |
| 2008 | Catch Me Now (原來愛上賊) | Fan Kwok-hin (Charles) |
| 2008 | Moonlight Resonance (溏心風暴之家好月圓) | Yu Hak-keung (Face-Oil Keung) |
| 2009 | E.U. (學警狙擊) | Pang Ho-leung (Pang Sir) |
| 2009 | Behind the Scene (幕後大老爺) | Diu Pang-fai |
| 2009 | The Season of Fate (碧血鹽梟) | Dau Hung |
| 2009 | ID精英 (ID精英) | Wai Hon-to |
| 2009 | In the Chamber of Bliss (王老虎搶親) | Zhu Zhishan (祝枝山) |
| 2009 | Beyond the Realm of Conscience (宮心計) | Ma Yuanzhi (馬元贄, General Ma) |
| 2009 | Off Pedder (畢打自己人) | Yu Kam-tim |
| 2009 | A Watchdog's Tale (老友狗狗) | Chiang Tin-hung (Bear Paw) |
| 2010 | In the Eye of the Beholder (秋香怒點唐伯虎) | Kam Yat-dim |
| 2010 | The Mysteries of Love (談情說案) | King Yin |
| 2010 | Can't Buy Me Love (公主嫁到) | Ding Choi-wong |
| 2010 | Gun Metal Grey (刑警) | Ho Kai-chit (Gigi) |
| 2010 | Twilight Investigation (囧探查過界) | Ho Lai-sun |
| 2011 | 7 Days in Life (隔離七日情) | Tai Bo |
| 2011 | Yes, Sir. Sorry, Sir! (點解阿Sir係阿Sir) | Ko Sun |
| 2011 | The Other Truth (真相) | Lo Sum |
| 2011 | Forensic Heroes III (法證先鋒III) | Luk Chun-kwong |
| 2012 | Witness Insecurity (護花危情) | Lai Shu-fung / Sapura |
| 2012 | Three Kingdoms RPG (回到三國) | Liu Bei (劉備, Liu Xuande) |
| 2012 | Tiger Cubs (飛虎) | Jim Kai-wai |
| 2012 | King Maker (造王者) | Yeung Chi-shan |
| 2013 | Sergeant Tabloid (戀愛星求人) | Leung Ping |
| 2013 | Sniper Standoff (神鎗狙擊) | Sheung Koon Tin |
| 2013 | Brother's Keeper (巨輪) | Kiu Sum (Kiu Sir) |
| 2013 | Come Home Love (愛·回家) | Yu Nin-hing |
| 2014 | Storm in a Cocoon (守業者) | Poon Wing-cheung |
| 2014 | Overachievers (叛逃) | Chung Lai-him |
| 2015 | The Fixer (拆局專家) | Lo Kang |
| 2015 | Under the Veil (無雙譜) | Nine-Thousand-Year Lord / Bao Zheng (包公) |
| 2015 | Lord of Shanghai (梟雄) | Lui Man-to (Master Lui) |
| 2016 | Love as a Predatory Affair (愛情食物鏈) | Ling Yu-kau |
| 2016 | Fashion War (潮流教主) | Tsui Wai |
| 2016 | ICAC Investigators 2016 (廉政行動2016) | Tsang Kwok-keung |
| 2016 | Rogue Emperor (流氓皇帝) | Yik Suk-kung |
| 2017 | Recipes to Live By (味想天開) | Tung Hon-yik |
| 2017 | Married but Available (我瞞結婚了) | Kei Wai-shui |
| 2017 | Bet Hur (賭城群英會) | To Tung-hoi (Butcher To) |
| 2017 | A General, a Scholar and a Eunuch (超時空男臣) | Chu Kwok-fung (Mr. Chu / Tai Fu Kwai) |
| 2017 | Nothing Special Force (雜警奇兵) | Mak Gwing-kwong (Uncle Gwing) |
| 2017 | Heart and Greed 3 (溏心風暴3) | Hui Nga-lun (Alan) |
| 2018 | The Forgotten Valley (平安谷之詭谷傳說) | Eunuch Wu |
| 2018 | Threesome (三個女人一個「因」) | Au-yeung Yat-bo |
| 2018 | OMG, Your Honour (是咁的，法官閣下) | Kui Kui-wai |
| 2019 | The Green Grass of Home (好日子) | Chai Yik-cheung |
| 2019 | Her Days (她她她的少女時代) | Fong Kan-sing |
| 2019 | The Man Who Kills Troubles (解決師) | Ko Chi-yung (Ko Sir) |
| 2020 | The Dripping Sauce (大醬園) | Lau King-yip |
| 2020 | Line Walker: Bull Fight (使徒行者3) | So Tsz-on (So Sir) |
| 2020 | Airport Strikers (堅離地愛堅離地) | Wong Sau-kan |
| 2021 | Sinister Beings (逆天奇案) | Mok Chun-bong (Mok Sir) |
| 2021 | Plan "B" (寶寶大過天) | Hong Lok (Hong Lok-kei) |
| 2021 | The Ringmaster (拳王) | Kam Bing-shun |
| 2021 | Return of the Cuckoo (十月初五的月光) | Clinic Customer |
| 2022 | 十八年後的終極告白2.0 (十八年後的終極告白2.0) | Sung Ting-piu (Uncle Piu) |
| 2022 | Darkside of the Moon (黯夜守護者) | Lo Wai (Master Wai / Wai Gor) |
| 2023 | The Queen of News (新聞女王) | Nip Chi-fai (Uncle Sze-kok) |
| 2024 | Sinister Beings 2 (逆天奇案2) | Mok Chun-bong (Mok Sir) |

=== Television series (Malaysia HVD) ===
| Year | Title | Role |
|---|---|---|
| 1992 | City Wonderful People (城市妙人) | — |
| 1993 | The Invincible Family (無敵一家親) | — |
| 1993 | I Love Petaling Street (我愛茨廠街) | Guo Fucheng |
| 1993 | Blood Is Thicker Than Love (血比情濃) | — |
| 1994 | Thirty-Year-Old Men (男人三十) | — |

=== Television series (Mainland China) ===
| Year | Title | Role |
|---|---|---|
| 2013 | Beauty at War (烽火佳人) | Zhou Mingchang |
| 2014 | Bao Xiao Gong Tang (包笑公堂) (web series) | Wu Jiji |
| 2015 | Hibiscus Brocade (芙蓉锦) | Xue Jingde |
| 2016 | Hidden Danger (暗战危城) | Liu Hantai |
| 2019 | The Director Is Acting on Me (导演对我下手了) (web series) | — |

=== Television (RTHK Television) ===
| Year | Title | Role |
|---|---|---|
| 1970s | Below the Lion Rock (獅子山下) – “Mother” | — |
| 1970s | Below the Lion Rock (獅子山下) – “The Road” | — |
| 1970s | Below the Lion Rock (獅子山下) – “Choice” | Yau Ka-yan |
| 1979 | Law Enforcers (執法者) – “Anti-Triad” | Police Officer |
| 1979 | Law Enforcers (執法者) – “Net of Heaven” | Chan Kei-cheong |
| 1990 | True Goodness (性本善) – “A Man’s Heart” | Marco |
| 1992 | Under the Roofs (屋簷下) – “7 a.m. to 12 a.m.” | May’s Husband |
| 1997 | Legal Entanglement 1997 (法門1997) – “Who Will Love Me” | Tang Kwok-yuen |
| 2012 | Casino Confused 2012 (賭海迷徒2012) | Wai Gei |
| 2015 | Casino Confused (賭海迷徒) | Yiu |

=== Film ===
| Year | Title | Role |
|---|---|---|
| 1981 | Dangerous Sixteen (危險十六歲) | — |
| 1983 | Side Line Car (同綫車) | — |
| 1983 | Auntie Has Talent (阿姐有料) | — |
| 1983 | Twenty Years of Feng Shui (風水二十年) | — |
| 1985 | Law or Justice (法外情) | Barrister Ding |
| 1986 | So Lucky to Meet Ghosts (鬼咁有緣) | — |
| 1989 | The School Field of Storms (風雨操場) | Math Teacher |
| 1989 | A Long Winter Vacation (寒假有夠長) | Police Officer |
| 1989 | Turbulent Evil Spirits (猛鬼山墳) | — |
| 1989 | The Undercover Crocodile (沉底鱷) | — |
| 1991 | Traitor and Thief (忠奸盜) | — |
| 1991 | Poisonous Hero (毒豪) | — |
| 1991 | Legless Cop (駁腳差佬) | — |
| 1991 | Crime Stars (罪惡煞星) | — |
| 1994 | Dragon Tiger New Storm (龍虎新風雲) | — |
| 1994 | Marking Heart (標心) | — |
| 1994 | 24 Hours of Shock (驚情廿四小時) | — |
| 2000 | Death Net (死亡網絡) | — |
| 2007 | Exiled (神探) | Wong Kwok-chu |
| 2009 | Tactical Unit – No Way Out (機動部隊－警例) | Ma Ba |
| 2010 | The Legend Is Born: Ip Man (葉問前傳) | Head Constable |
| 2014 | The White Storm (魔警) | Paper Man Yan |
| 2015 | Murmur of the Hearts (暴瘋語) | Inspector Lee |
| 2015 | Run Xiao Fan (奔跑吧小凡) (web film) | Father |
| 2015 | Beach Rescue Team vs Sea Monster (海灘救援隊之食人海怪) (web film) | Old Eagle |
| 2016 | Blood Fight in Causeway Bay (血戰銅鑼灣) (web film) | Shou Chang |
| 2016 | Immortal Chef (仙醫神廚) (web film) | Wei Zhu |
| 2016 | Immortal Academy (仙俠學院) (web film) | Head of Year |
| 2017 | Super Youth: Battle of Destiny (超能少年之宿命之戰) (web film) | Wan Ci |
| 2017 | Operation Dynamo (拆弹专家) | Cross-Harbour Tunnel Chief Engineer |
| 2017 | With Prisoners (同囚) | Gu Mingda (Old Ghost) |
| 2017 | Blood Village: Mystery (紅衣詭村之幻·謎) (web film) | Zheng Haomin |
| 2020 | Demon Subduing Divine Needle (降妖除魔之定海神针) (web film) | — |
| 2020 | Battle Through Heaven (斗战苍穹) (web film) | Mirror Lord |
| 2020 | Inner Demon (心魔) (web film) | Zhou Haocheng |
| 2020 | My God on the Left, My Enemy on the Right (男神在左冤家在右) (web film) | Lin Tang |
| 2021 | Awakening in Golden City (梦醒黄金城) | — |
| 2021 | Tang Bohu Steals Heaven and Changes the Sun (唐伯虎之偷天換日) (web film) | — |
| 2024 | YOLO (热辣滚烫) | Himself |

== Interviews ==
- Ming Pao (明報)
- 3 Weekly (3周刊)
- Sudden Weekly (忽然一周)
- Apple Daily (蘋果日報)

== Advertisements ==
- Wing Tat Tong Hang Jun Wan (永達堂行軍丸)
- 2015: Yingli Mortgage Finance (英利按揭財務)

== Awards and nominations ==
| Year | Award Ceremony | Award | Drama | Role | Result |
|---|---|---|---|---|---|
| 2009 | TVB Anniversary Awards 2009 | Best Supporting Actor | Beyond the Realm of Conscience | Ma Yuen-chi | Nominated (Top 5) |
| 2011 | TVB Anniversary Awards 2011 | Best Supporting Actor | Forensic Heroes III | Luk Chun-kwong | Nominated (Top 5) |
| 2015 | TVB Anniversary Awards 2015 | Best Supporting Actor | A Change of Heart | Nine Thousand Years | Nominated |
| 2016 | Hangzhou Linwu Qiyi Culture and Arts Company Awards Ceremony | Most Popular Actor of the Year | N/A | | Won |
| 2022 | TVB Anniversary Awards 2022 | Best Supporting Actor | Night Beauties | Law Wai | Nominated |
| 2022 | TVB Anniversary Awards 2022 | Most Popular Male TV Character | Night Beauties | Law Wai | Nominated |
