= Daniel Mustard =

American singer-songwriter and musician (born 1975)

Daniel "Homeless" Mustard (born December 25, 1975) is an American singer-songwriter and musician. His nickname is derived from the fact that he is homeless. He appeared on the Opie and Anthony Show after being chosen to participate in their "Homeless Shopping Spree" charity event. However, due to restrictions placed by SirusXM management they were unable to follow through. With airtime set aside for the event that needed to be filled, and because they had already brought in several other homeless people, they decided to improvise a "Homeless Talent Show". During his interview Daniel disclosed his history as a musician and was asked to perform a song. He obliged, playing "Creep" by Radiohead, and delivered a solo performance that was extremely well received by surprised critics and an audience alike. He has since recorded an EP, Daniel Mustard EP released on November 30, 2010.

On October 26, 2012, via his Facebook page, Mustard announced he would be making a short documentary about his story and career so far. He asked fans, specifically in the New York City area, to volunteer themselves to be interviewed about the first time they heard his cover and what impact it may have had on them.

Mustard's second release, Fragments of Bone, was completed and released using funding from a Kickstarter campaign which was held on September 25, 2012 and was produced by James Bertuzzi. The album contains a new recording of his cover of "Creep".

On December 7, 2012, Mustard released a Christmas song called "Since Santa Ain't Coming" via his YouTube channel accompanied by a music video. He describes the song as an 'anti-Christmas song' due to his little love for the holiday, mostly because his birthday happens to fall on the same day.
