= Pablo Honey =

1993 studio album by Radiohead

Studio album by Radiohead
- Released: 22 February 1993
- Recorded: 1992
- Studios: Chipping Norton, Oxfordshire; Courtyard Studios, Oxfordshire
- Genres: Alternative rock; grunge
- Length: 42:11
- Labels: Parlophone; Capitol
- Producers: Sean Slade; Paul Q. Kolderie; Chris Hufford

Radiohead chronology
Drill (1992)	Pablo Honey (1993)	My Iron Lung (1994)

Singles from Pablo Honey
- 1. "Creep" Released: 21 September 1992; 2. "Anyone Can Play Guitar" Released: 1 February 1993; 3. "Stop Whispering" Released: 5 October 1993

Pablo Honey is the debut studio album by the English rock band Radiohead, released on 22 February 1993 in the UK by Parlophone and on 20 April 1993 in the US by Capitol Records. It was produced by Sean Slade, Paul Q. Kolderie and Radiohead's co-manager Chris Hufford.

Radiohead formed in 1985 at Abingdon School in Abingdon, Oxfordshire, and signed a recording contract with EMI in 1991. Their debut EP, Drill (1992), achieved little success. For their debut album, Radiohead's management targeted the American market and chose American producers. Pablo Honey was recorded in three weeks at Chipping Norton Recording Studios in Oxfordshire in 1992. The recording was hampered by Radiohead's lack of studio experience.

The singles "Creep", "Anyone Can Play Guitar" and "Stop Whispering" initially made little impact. However, "Creep" gradually gained international radio play, reaching number seven on the UK singles chart after it was reissued in 1993. Radiohead embarked on an aggressive promotional tour in the US supporting Belly and PJ Harvey, followed by a European tour supporting James. In May 1995, a live video, Live at the Astoria (1995), was released on VHS.

Pablo Honey reached number 22 on the UK Albums Chart. It was certified gold in the UK in 1994 and double platinum in 2013. In the US, it was certified platinum in 1995. Pablo Honey received generally favourable reviews, but some found it underdeveloped or derivative. Though it is less acclaimed than Radiohead's later work, some retrospective reviews have been positive and it has appeared in lists of the greatest albums. The members of Radiohead have criticised it, citing weaker songwriting and their studio inexperience. "Creep" remains Radiohead's most successful single.

== Background ==
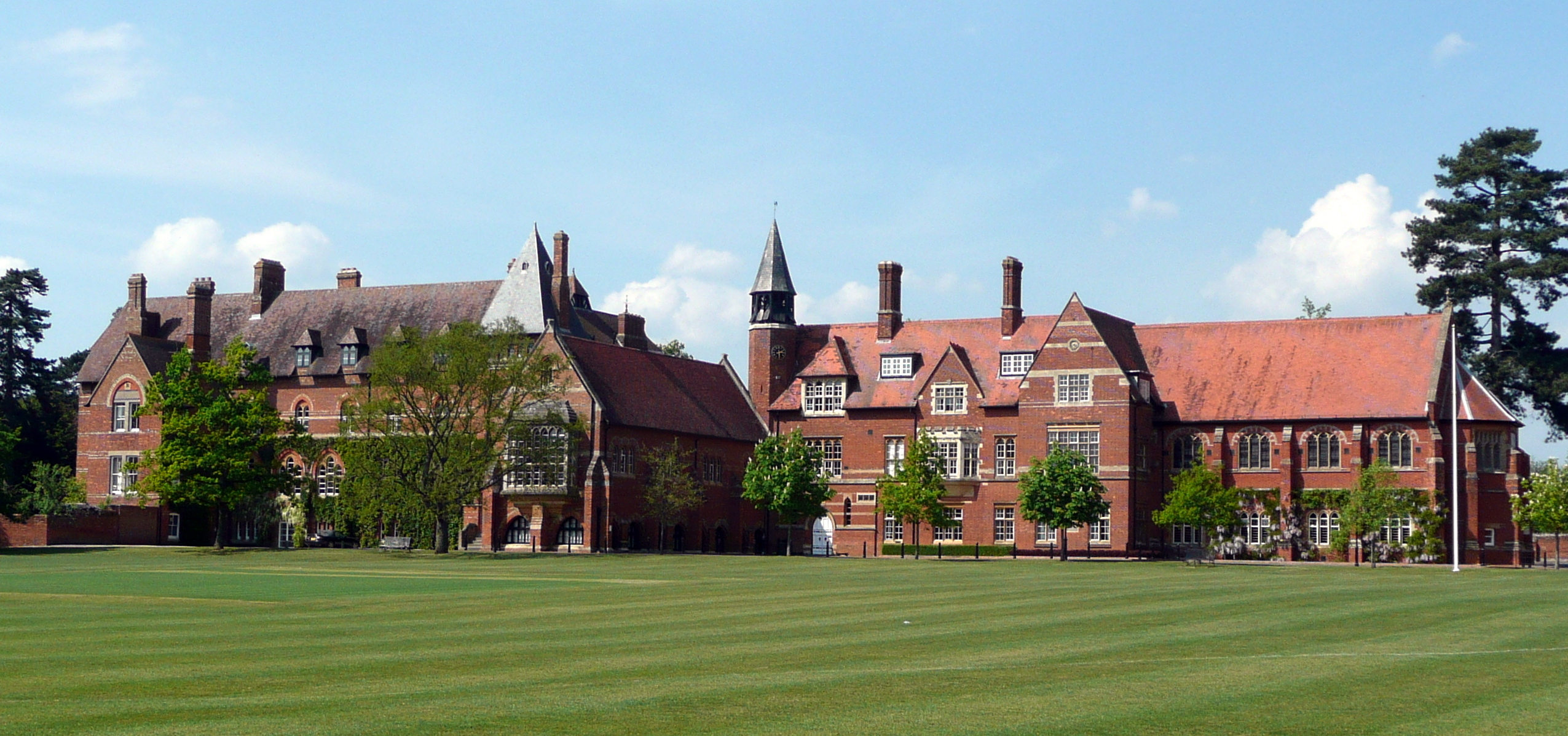
Abingdon School, Oxfordshire, where Radiohead formed

The members of Radiohead met while attending Abingdon School in Abingdon, Oxfordshire. In 1985, they formed On a Friday, the name referring to their usual rehearsal day in the school's music room. They recorded demo tapes, including a cassette unofficially titled Manic Hedgehog, which featured versions of the future Pablo Honey tracks "You", "I Can't" and "Thinking About You".

One demo attracted the attention of a local producer, Chris Hufford. He and his business partner, Bryce Edge, became the band's managers after attending a concert at the Jericho Tavern, Oxford. In late 1991, On a Friday signed a six-album recording contract with EMI and changed their name at EMI's request. Their name was taken from the Talking Heads song "Radio Head" from the 1986 album True Stories.

Radiohead released their debut EP, Drill, in 1992. It was produced by Hufford in his studio, Courtyard Studios, in Oxfordshire. It reached number 101 on the UK singles chart; the Guardian later described it as an "inauspicious start" that drew little attention. Hufford said producing the EP himself was a mistake, as it created a conflict of interest and generated friction in the studio.

Hufford and Edge resolved to find different producers for Radiohead's next recording. Independent labels dominated the indie charts in the UK, but EMI was a major label. Hufford and Edge therefore planned to have Radiohead use American producers and tour aggressively in America, then return to build a following in the UK. They considered hiring Steve Albini, but he had not yet worked with major acts and EMI felt it was too risky.

Around this time, the American producers Paul Kolderie and Sean Slade, who had worked with bands including the Pixies and Dinosaur Jr, were in the UK looking for work. The EMI A&R director, Nick Gatfield, gave them a selection of acts to consider. They agreed to produce Radiohead after he played them "Stop Whispering". Kolderie was particularly impressed by Thom Yorke's vocals. Upon meeting the band, Kolderie was struck by their youth, unity and closeness, and described "a seriousness of purpose and a seriousness of trying to create music that was a little different". He was initially more impressed by Hufford and Edge than by Radiohead, calling them "crafty mothers ... I don't think I've ever met two guys who had more of a plan."

== Recording ==
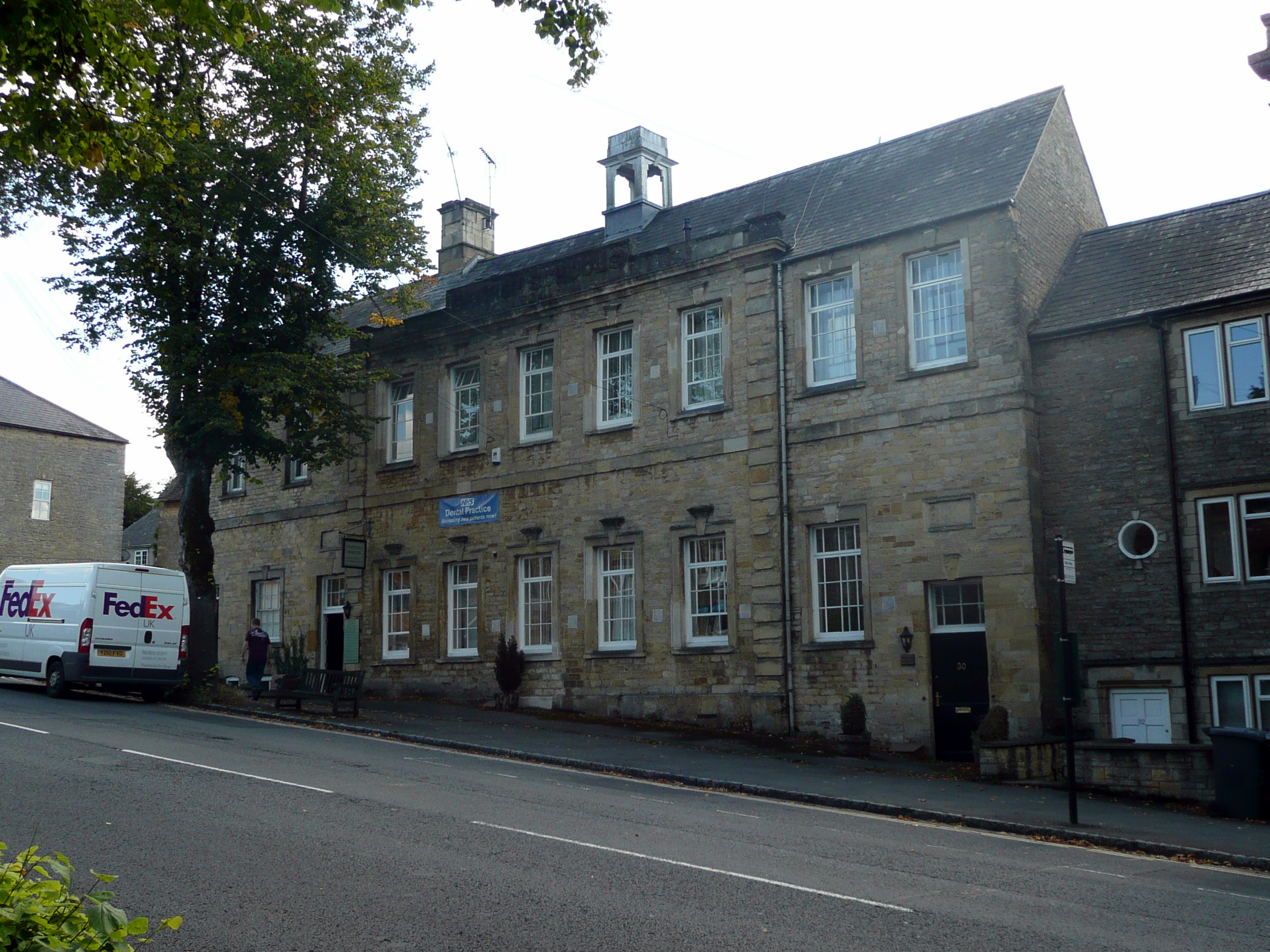
The former Chipping Norton Recording Studios, Oxfordshire, where Radiohead recorded Pablo Honey

Radiohead recorded Pablo Honey at Chipping Norton Studios in Chipping Norton, Oxfordshire. They first attempted to record two songs that EMI was considering for Radiohead's debut single, "Inside My Head" and "Lurgee". They made little progress; Kolderie described Radiohead as "desperately inexperienced", and neither they nor the producers liked the choice of songs. Kolderie said "Inside My Head" was "not very melodic" and lacked the power of Radiohead's other songs. Hufford described the results as "overblown bombastic rock".

During rehearsals, Radiohead unexpectedly played another song, "Creep". They considered it a "throwaway" track, but it impressed the producers. At Kolderie's suggestion, they recorded a take, after which everyone in the studio burst into applause. EMI were persuaded to make "Creep" Radiohead's debut single. According to Kolderie, "everyone [at EMI] who heard Creep just started going insane" and he and Slade were hired to produce the album.

Pablo Honey was recorded in three weeks. Kolderie described it as a struggle, and said: "It was their first record and they wanted to be the Beatles, and the mix had to have no reverb, and they had all the ideas they'd ever come up with in 20 years of listening to records." Kolderie noted their studio inexperience and difficulty in finishing tracks, but enjoyed the work due to the small group and joking atmosphere. He said Pablo Honey was "not cheap", and estimated that it had cost more than £100,000 to record.

Yorke, Jonny Greenwood and Ed O'Brien overdubbed the same guitar parts multiple times to create a distorted "wall of sound". For the introduction to "Anyone Can Play Guitar", Kolderie had everyone in the studio, including the cook, create sounds on guitar. "The idea was to live up to the title: anyone can play guitar," he said. Greenwood used a paintbrush for his part. Radiohead did not like the version of "Lurgee" they recorded with Kolderie and Slade, and used an earlier version, recorded with Hufford at Courtyard, for the album.

The album title comes from a prank call sketch by the American comedy act the Jerky Boys in which the caller poses as the victim's mother and says: "Pablo, honey? Please come to Florida." Yorke said it was appropriate as the band were "mothers' boys". A sample of the sketch appears during the guitar solo on "How Do You?"

== Music and lyrics ==
Pablo Honey has been described as alternative rock grunge, stadium rock, progressive rock, college rock, post-grunge, and jangle pop. It drew comparisons to Nirvana, Dinosaur Jr., Sugar, U2, the Smiths, the Cure, the Who and the Jam.

O'Brien later described Pablo Honey as a "hedonistic" album that "you might put on in an open-top car on a Saturday night going to a party". Stephen Thomas Erlewine of AllMusic described it as a blend of the anthemic rock of U2 with "atmospheric" instrumental passages. The Salon journalist Annie Zaleski said it featured "distortion-blurred guitar lines that twisted like a kite in the wind". Gary Walker, writing for Guitar.com, described it as "nakedly naive and unguarded" compared to Radiohead's more complex later work. He wrote that it captured the "embryonic dynamic" between the three guitarists and described Greenwood's guitar work as an "exhilarating melange of tremolo-picked soundscapes, chunky octaves, screaming high-register runs and killswitch antics". The opening track, "You", moves between major and minor chords and alternating time signatures. "Blow Out" combines elements of bossa nova and krautrock; it starts with "tense, jazzy" drumming and raked chords and concludes with a shoegaze section.

Zaleski said the Pablo Honey lyrics express anger at the status quo, the feeling of being an outsider, and worry for the future. "Creep" features a quiet verse and a loud chorus, with "blasts" of guitar noise from Greenwood. Yorke described it as a "self-destruct song". The lyrics were inspired by a woman that Yorke followed around who unexpectedly attended a Radiohead performance. The lyrics of "Stop Whispering" are about oppression, and the frustration from failing to explain it. Yorke wrote the line "Grow my hair, I wanna be Jim Morrison", from "Anyone Can Play Guitar", in response to people in the music business who "think they have to act like fucking prats in order to live up to the legend". According to Zaleski, "Ripcord" is about the "experience of hurtling into the unknown". "Lurgee" ends with a "meandering" solo.

== Release ==
"Creep" was released as the lead Pablo Honey single on 21 September 1992. It initially received little airplay and sold around 6,000 copies, reaching number 78 on the UK singles chart. The 1993 singles "Anyone Can Play Guitar" and "Stop Whispering", plus the non-album single "Pop Is Dead", were unsuccessful. Only "Anyone Can Play Guitar" and "Pop Is Dead" charted in the UK. Radiohead rerecorded "Stop Whispering" for the US single as they were not happy with the album version. O'Brien said the new version was "more atmospheric", likening it to Joy Division.

Pablo Honey was released in February 1993 and received little press. It reached number 25 in 1993's UK Albums Chart. However, "Creep" became a hit in Israel, where it was played frequently by the radio DJ Yoav Kutner. In March, Radiohead were invited to Tel Aviv for their first overseas show. Around the same time, "Creep" rose to number two on the US Modern Rock chart, and Pablo Honey was selling well on import. "Creep" reached number 34 on the Billboard Hot 100 chart, and reached number seven on the UK singles chart when EMI rereleased it in September 1993. In the UK, Pablo Honey was certified silver in February 1994, gold in April 1994, platinum in June 1997, and double platinum in July 2013. In the US, it was certified gold in September 1993 and platinum in September 1995.

== Tour ==
In late 1992, Radiohead toured the UK with Kingmaker and the Frank and Walters. That September, they performed at the UK EMI conference. They impressed the EMI promoter Carol Baxter, who said: "This funny little band came on and they obviously had something. This was a hideous record company do but Thom gave it everything." That Christmas, NME published a review of a Radiohead performance that dismissed them as "a pitiful, lily-livered excuse for a rock 'n' roll group".

In June 1993, Radiohead began their first North American tour. In July, they gave a performance of "Anyone Can Play Guitar" live on MTV Beach House in which Yorke screamed the improvised lyrics "fat, ugly, dead!", before breaking down on camera and jumping into a pool. Yorke was holding a live microphone and narrowly avoided electrocuting himself.

Radiohead cancelled an appearance at the 1993 Reading Festival after Yorke became ill; he told NME, "Physically I'm completely fucked and mentally I've had enough." According to some reports, EMI gave Radiohead six months to "get sorted" or be dropped. EMI's A&R head, Keith Wozencroft, denied this, saying: "Experimental rock music was getting played and had commercial potential. People voice different paranoias, but for the label [Radiohead] were developing brilliantly from Pablo Honey."

In September 1993, after "Creep" was reissued, Radiohead performed it on the British music programme Top of the Pops and as the first musical guests on the American talk show Late Night with Conan O'Brien. EMI's American arm, Capitol, wanted to continue promoting Pablo Honey and build on the momentum. Radiohead declined an offer to tour the US in support of Duran Duran, as their managers felt they could earn more credibility by supporting Belly. They also opened for PJ Harvey in New York City and Los Angeles. On 13 May 1995, a live video, Live at the Astoria, was released on VHS, with performances of Pablo Honey songs such as "Creep", "You" and "Anyone Can Play Guitar".

Radiohead struggled with the tour. Yorke disliked dealing with American music journalists and tired of the songs. The band members appeared in promotional material they later regretted, such as fashion shoots for Iceberg jeans and the magazine Interview. According to Radiohead's agent, the promotional work triggered "a lot of soul-searching about why they were in a group at all". Jonny Greenwood said they "spent a year being jukeboxes ... We felt in a creative stasis because we couldn't release anything new." The American tour was followed by a European tour supporting James and Tears for Fears. Kolderie credited the Pablo Honey tours for turning Radiohead "into a tight band".

== Critical reception ==
Contemporaneous reviews
Review scores
Source	Rating
Calgary Herald	B
Entertainment Weekly	B
Los Angeles Times	2.5/4 stars
NME	7/10
Q	3/5 stars
Select	3/5

Pablo Honey failed to make a critical impact upon its initial release. NME's John Harris referred to Radiohead as "one of rock's brightest hopes". He felt "How Do You?" broke the album's momentum "horribly", but described Pablo Honey as "satisfying" despite its flaws. NME later named it the 35th-best album of the year. Q wrote that "British teenagerhood has never been grumpier" and described Pablo Honey as a good album with moments that rivalled Nirvana, Dinosaur Jr. and Sugar.

In the United States, "Creep" drew parallels with Nirvana, with some describing Radiohead as the "British Nirvana". Billboard said the lyrics had "enough bite to make it on their own" despite the U2 comparisons. In a mixed review, Mario Mundoz of the Los Angeles Times wrote that it "doesn't really deliver anything you haven't heard before" but "does offer clever lyrics and good hooks". Robert Christgau of The Village Voice did not recommend Pablo Honey, but named "Creep" a "choice cut". Rolling Stone wrote that the album's charm originates from its guitar work, song structures, melodies, and choruses with "pop appeal".

== Legacy ==
Retrospective reviews
Review scores
Source	Rating
AllMusic	3/5 stars
The A.V. Club	B−
Blender	2/5 stars
The Encyclopedia of Popular Music	3/5 stars
The Irish Times	3/5 stars
Pitchfork	5.4/10
Q	3/5 stars
Rolling Stone	3/5 stars
The Rolling Stone Album Guide	2.5/5 stars
Uncut	3/5 stars

Although Pablo Honey did not receive the acclaim of Radiohead's later albums, it received praise in retrospective coverage. In 2018, the musician and journalist Phil Witmer wrote that the knowledge of Radiohead's "extraordinary" later work made Pablo Honey "endearing". He named "You" and "Blow Out" as the most sophisticated tracks, pointing towards Radiohead's later work. The Premier Guitar writer Shawn Hammond also highlighted "Blow Out" as a "glimpse of future brilliance".

According to Stephen Thomas Erlewine of AllMusic, the songwriting does not always match Radiohead's sound, but when it does, it achieves "a rare power that is both visceral and intelligent". Kenny EG Perry of NME described the album as "the sound of one of the best bands of this or any other generation playing the music that taught them all their good early lessons". Clash said that it "points towards everything that [Radiohead] would go on to be".

In a 2008 review, Al Spicer of BBC Music described Pablo Honey as Radiohead's "exploration of suburban, adolescent self-awareness" and "one of rock's most impressive debuts". In 2009, PopMatters' Mehan Jahasuriya criticised Pablo Honey as "a hodgepodge of half-baked grunge, jangle-pop and stadium-ready alternative rock ... nearly indistinguishable from other early '90s college rock throwaways, save for a few hints of greatness". Reviewing the 2009 reissue for Pitchfork, Scott Plagenhoef praised "Creep", "You", "Stop Whispering" and "Prove Yourself", but described "How Do You?", "I Can't", "Ripcord" and "Vegetable" as "run of the mill at best". In Uncut, Sam Richards wrote that Pablo Honey "isn't as completely cack-handed as many would have you believe. It's lumpy and uneven and often sounds like a band pulling in five different directions – but that last quality was, and occasionally remains, part of Radiohead's appeal." In 2025, GQ named Pablo Honey the worst Radiohead album, calling it "an uneven, unsteady beast" that might have been forgotten without "Creep".

After the success of "Creep", Radiohead grew to resent it. In 1993, Yorke said: "It's like it's not our song any more ... It feels like we're doing a cover." The success almost led to Radiohead's breakup, and Radiohead stopped performing "Creep" for several years. Though Radiohead achieved greater commercial and critical success with later albums, "Creep" remains their most successful single. Their frustration influenced their second album, The Bends (1995). The album title, a term for decompression sickness, references Radiohead's rapid rise to fame; Yorke said "we just came up too fast". Unhappy with the Pablo Honey cover art, Yorke enlisted his friend Stanley Donwood to help create the artwork for future Radiohead releases. Based on their work on Pablo Honey, the American band Hole hired Slade and Kolderie to produce their 1994 album Live Through This.

In 2007, Pitchfork wrote that, with Pablo Honey, "Radiohead didn't so much ride the coattails of grunge to mass success as stumble over them, and they've been apologising for it ever since." In 1996, the bassist, Colin Greenwood, said, "I'd give [Pablo Honey] a seven out of 10 – not bad for an album recorded in just two and a half weeks." In 1997, O'Brien said the guitar arrangements were "boring", with all three guitarists playing similar parts; by comparison, Radiohead's later songs feature greater separation and "riffs and melodies that interweave at different registers". O'Brien said Pablo Honey was derivative of Dinosaur Jr. and the Pixies, and described it as "our greatest hits as an unsigned band". Jonny Greenwood said in 1998 that it "lacked freedom", and was hindered by Radiohead's fear and inexperience. O'Brien said in 2020 that Pablo Honey was "pretty shit [...] but we worked hard and became good. That's one of the things I've held onto: you don't have to have all the answers straight away."

=== Accolades ===
In 1998, Pablo Honey was voted the 100th-best album of all time in a poll held by Virgin and 61st in a poll by Q. The journalist Colin Larkin placed it 301st in the third edition of All Time Top 1000 Albums (2000). As part of its 2007 list of the "500 Greatest Lost Tracks", Q included "Lurgee" and "Blow Out" in a list of 20 essential lesser-known Radiohead songs. In 2006, Classic Rock and Metal Hammer named Pablo Honey one of the 20 greatest albums of 1993. In 2008, Blender ranked it 82nd in its list of "100 Albums You Must Own".

== Reissues ==
Radiohead left EMI after their contract ended in 2003. In 2007, EMI released Radiohead Box Set, a compilation of albums recorded while Radiohead were signed to EMI, including Pablo Honey. In 2009, EMI reissued Pablo Honey in a "Collector's Edition" with the Drill EP tracks, B-sides and alternative takes. Radiohead had no input into the reissues and the music was not remastered.

In February 2013, Parlophone was bought by Warner Music Group (WMG). In April 2016, as a result of an agreement with the trade group Impala, WMG transferred Radiohead's back catalogue to XL Recordings. The EMI reissues, released without Radiohead's consent, were removed from streaming services. In May 2016, XL reissued Radiohead's back catalogue on vinyl, including Pablo Honey.

== Track listing ==
All lyrics are written by Thom Yorke; all music is composed by Radiohead, except "Creep", written by Radiohead, Mike Hazlewood and Albert Hammond. (Note: "Creep" was originally credited solely to Radiohead. Following legal action, Radiohead admitted taking elements of "The Air That I Breathe" and Hazlewood and Hammond were added as songwriters.)

Pablo Honey track listing
No.	Title	Length
1.	"You"	3:29
2.	"Creep"	3:56
3.	"How Do You?"	2:12
4.	"Stop Whispering"	5:26
5.	"Thinking About You"	2:41
6.	"Anyone Can Play Guitar"	3:38
7.	"Ripcord"	3:10
8.	"Vegetable"	3:13
9.	"Prove Yourself"	2:25
10.	"I Can't"	4:13
11.	"Lurgee"	3:08
12.	"Blow Out"	4:40
Total length:		42:11

== Personnel ==
Adapted from the liner notes, except where noted.

=== Radiohead ===
- Thom Yorke – vocals, guitar
- Jonny Greenwood – lead guitar, piano, organ
- Ed O'Brien – guitar, vocals
- Colin Greenwood – bass guitar, guitar on "Anyone Can Play Guitar"
- Philip Selway – drums, guitar on "Anyone Can Play Guitar"

=== Production ===
- Chris Blair – mastering
- Chris Hufford – production, engineering (tracks 10, 11)
- Paul Q. Kolderie – production, engineering (tracks 1–9, 12), mixing, guitar on "Anyone Can Play Guitar"
- Sean Slade – production, engineering (tracks 1–9, 12), mixing, guitar on "Anyone Can Play Guitar"

=== Design ===
- Icon – design
- Lisa Bunny Jones – paintings
- Tom Sheehan – photography

== Charts ==
=== Weekly charts ===
Weekly chart performance for Pablo Honey
Chart (1993–1994)	Peak position
Australian Albums (ARIA)	86
Canada Top Albums/CDs (RPM)	42
Dutch Albums (Album Top 100)	61
New Zealand Albums (RMNZ)	44
UK Albums (Official Charts)	22
US Billboard 200	32
Chart (1996–1997)	Peak position
Belgian Albums (Ultratop Flanders)	38
Belgian Albums (Ultratop Wallonia)	28
Swedish Albums (Sverigetopplistan)	56
Chart (2003)	Peak position
French Albums (SNEP)	108
Swiss Albums (Schweizer Hitparade)	91
Chart (2010)	Peak position
Spanish Albums (Promusicae)	91
Chart (2025)	Peak position
Croatian International Albums (HDU)	15

=== Year-end charts ===
Year-end chart performance for Pablo Honey
Chart (1996)	Position
UK Albums (OCC)	99

== Certifications and sales ==
Certifications and sales for Pablo Honey
Region	Certification	Certified units/sales
Argentina (CAPIF)	Gold	30,000^{^}
Australia (ARIA)	Gold	35,000^{^}
Belgium (BRMA)	Platinum	50,000^{*}
Canada (Music Canada)	2× Platinum	200,000^{^}
Denmark (IFPI Danmark)	2× Platinum	40,000^{‡}
Italy (FIMI) (Since 2009)	Gold	25,000^{‡}
Netherlands (NVPI)	Gold	50,000^{^}
United Kingdom (BPI)	2× Platinum	600,000^{^}
United States (RIAA)	Platinum	1,520,000
^{*} Sales figures based on certification alone.^{^} Shipments figures based on certification alone.^{‡} Sales+streaming figures based on certification alone.
