= Drill (EP) =

EP by Radiohead
- Released: 5 May 1992
- Studios: Courtyard Studios, Oxford
- Genres: Alternative rock, indie rock
- Length: 10:33
- Label: Parlophone
- Producer: Chris Hufford

Radiohead chronology
Drill (1992)	Pablo Honey (1993)

Drill is the debut EP by the English rock band Radiohead, released in May 1992. It was Radiohead's first commercial release, and attracted little attention, reaching 101 on the UK singles chart. Radiohead rerecorded three Drill songs for their debut album, Pablo Honey (1993).

== Background ==
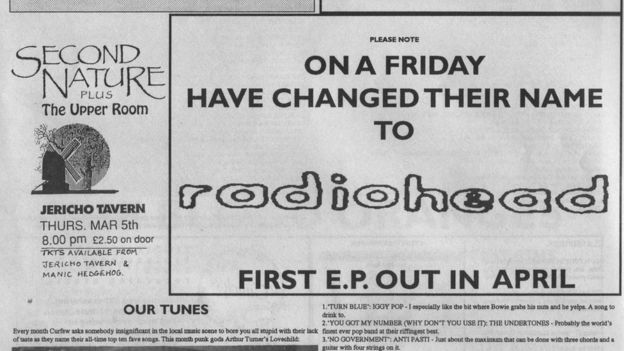
Advertisement for Drill in the Oxford music magazine Curfew, which also announced the band's name change.

The members of Radiohead met while attending Abingdon School, an independent school for boys in Abingdon, England. In 1985, they formed On a Friday, the name referring to their usual rehearsal day in the school's music room. They recorded demos including the Manic Hedgehog tape, named after a record shop in Oxford.

In late 1991, Radiohead signed a six-album recording contract with EMI and changed their name at EMI's request. "Radiohead" was taken from the song "Radio Head" on the Talking Heads album True Stories (1986).

== Recording ==
Radiohead recorded Drill at Courtyard Studios in Oxon, England. It was produced by Radiohead's co-manager, Chris Hufford. Hufford said this was a mistake, as it created a conflict of interest and generated friction in the studio. Drill featured two new recordings, "Prove Yourself" and "Stupid Car"; the other songs were taken from Radiohead's Manic Hedgehog demo.

== Release ==
Drill was released on 5 May 1992. It reached number 101 on the UK singles chart and made little impact. The Guardian described it as an "inauspicious start". Radiohead toured with Catherine Wheel and the Sultans of Ping in support of Drill. "Prove Yourself" was played on BBC Radio 1 by Gary Davies, Radiohead's first national radio exposure in the UK.

In 1996, Record Collector described Drill as "abrasive and melancholic by turns", with "the first in a long history of nihilistic one-liners that suggested Thom's worldview was one of genuine self-loathing rather than bathetic self-pity". The music journalist Mac Randall wrote later: "Even as early as 1992, Thom Yorke's graceful, arrestingly plaintive vocal style was well developed, far more so than the band's songwriting or overall sound."

Radiohead rerecorded "You", "Prove Yourself" and "Thinking About You" for their debut album, Pablo Honey (1993). Capitol reissued Drill on vinyl in April 2009. It was added to streaming services in January 2020.

== Track listing ==
Drill track listing
No.	Title	Length
1.	"Prove Yourself"	2:32
2.	"Stupid Car"	2:25
3.	"You"	3:22
4.	"Thinking About You"	2:17
Total length:		10:36

== Personnel ==
Credits taken from the Drill credits.

- Thom Yorke – vocals, guitar
- Jonny Greenwood – guitar
- Ed O'Brien – guitar, backing vocals
- Colin Greenwood – bass guitar
- Philip Selway – drums
- Chris Hufford — production and engineering
- Timm Baldwin — mixing
