= Nightshift (magazine) =

Free monthly music magazine in Oxford, England

- Front cover of March 2008, featuring Foals
- Editor: Ronan Munro
- Frequency: Monthly
- First issue: March 1991
- Final issue: June 2026
- Country: United Kingdom
- Based in: Oxford
- Language: English
- Website: nightshiftmag.co.uk

Nightshift was a free monthly music magazine in Oxford, England, published by Ronan Munro from 1991 to 2026. Distributed via music venues, pubs, and shops, it provided music news, gig listings, and reviews for the city and surrounding area.

== History ==
Nightshift was first published in March 1991. It was originally titled Curfew, and continued under that name until the end of 1994, when the main venues in Oxford — the Venue, the Jericho Tavern, and the Hollybush — closed temporarily and there was little music scene to cover. Curfew had the earliest reviews and interviews with Radiohead and Supergrass. In July 1995, publication started anew as Nightshift, ahead of the opening of venues the Zodiac and the Point.

After a hiatus due to the COVID-19 pandemic, Nightshift arranged a fundraiser on 1 July 2021 to raise £12,000 to cover printing and distribution costs. Oxford bands Radiohead, Supergrass, Foals, Glass Animals, Ride, Stornoway and Young Knives contributed items for a prize draw. On 5 July, after four days of fundraising, the editor, Ronan Munro, announced the target had been met, securing nine months of printing and distribution costs.

In June 2026, after 35 years in publication, Munro announced thatthe magazine had published its final issue. Munro had turned 60 and wanted to retire.

== Content ==
Each month has a feature on one local artist or group, with their picture appearing on the front cover, and an interview inside. There are occasional exceptions to this format, for example the November 2010 issue featured a round up of the Metal scene, and July 2010 covered Truck Festival.

The magazine includes local music news, new release, gig, and demo, reviews, and a gig guide for the month. Advertisements support the magazine's production and distribution.

In the Demos section, editor Munro reviews demos sent by local musicians, with no pretence of being unbiased. The reviews are entirely based upon his opinions and preferences, but — despite sometimes harsh words for music deemed lacking — there is genuine constructive criticism, and many bands later submit improved demos. The best and worst entries in a month are put in 'Demo of the month' and 'The Demo dumper', respectively.

Parachutes are apparently a five-piece band, though they sound more like some sausage-fingered bedroom hermit collapsing on the random play buttons of every instrument in his room and deluding himself that it’s something akin to avant garde genius.

— Ronan Munro, The Demo Dumper, Nightshift August 2009.

The instructions for submitting demos include the warning "If you can’t handle criticism, please don’t send us your demo".

At the start of the Covid pandemic Nightshift closed down. The last edition of the magazine was an online-only issue covering April 2020. Another online-only issue appeared in December 2020 containing a feature on how Oxford's music scene was coping with lockdowns as well as the magazine's traditional end of year Top 30 of oxford songs.

In July 2021 Nightshift launched a Crowdfunder campaign to raise funds for a return to coincide with the lifting of Covid restrictions on live music. Radiohead, Supergrass, Foals, Ride, Swervedriver, Glass Animals, Stornoway and Young Knives contributed rare and signed prizes alongside local venues and shops The campaign raised over £16,000 and the magazine returned in print in October 2021, coinciding with its 300th issue.

== The Punt ==
From 1997 until 2016 Nightshift organised the Punt, an annual music event featuring unsigned Oxfordshire bands in five venues around Oxford. The Punt was conceived during the warm-up for Oxford Sound City in 1997. Among the acts that received early exposure after being picked to play at the Punt were Young Knives, Stornoway, Little Fish, Fixers and Elizabeth, the band featuring a teenage Yannis Phillipakis, later of Foals.
