= Kingmaker (board game) =

Game about the War of the Roses

- Cover of the original British version
- Designers: Andrew McNeil
- Publishers: PhilMar Ltd. Avalon Hill; TM Games; Gibsons Games
- Players: 2–7
- Setup time: 10 minutes
- Playing time: 2-6 hours
- Age range: teen to adult
- Skills: diplomacy, alliances, and double-dealing

Kingmaker is a board game published in the UK by PhilMar Ltd. in 1974 that simulates the political struggles to place a king on the throne of England during the Wars of the Roses. The game was popular, and other editions, including a computerized version, were produced by Avalon Hill, TM Games, and Gibsons Games. The game won a Charles S. Roberts Award in 1976.

== Description ==
Kingmaker is a board game for 2–7 players in which each player controls one or more royal families in 15th-century England. Through war, diplomacy, and politics, the players attempt to gain control of one or more members of the two rival royal families, the House of Lancaster and the House of York, to place one of them on the throne of England while eliminating all other "pretenders."

=== Components ===
- a map board of 15th century England and nearby lands, marked with walled cities, towns, castles, forests, and roads. Rather than using a hex grid, the map is divided into square areas.
- a deck of Event cards that contain two things, a random event on the upper half of the card and a battle result on the bottom of the card.
- a deck of Crown cards, which includes:
  - Nobles, some already titled such as Neville, Beaufort, or Percy; but most are untitled.
  - Titles that can be bestowed on an untitled noble, such as "Earl of Essex" or "Duke of Exeter." Many titles, ex officio, provide the owning player with troops or town affiliations.
  - Offices of government that can be assigned to a titled noble, such as Marshal of England, Warden of the Cinque Ports, or Chancellor of England. Offices provide troops, castles, towns, and even transport ships in some cases.
  - Ecclesiastical offices that can be bestowed on a noble, such as Archbishop of York or Bishop of Lincoln. Some, in the Avalon Hill edition, have troops, and all have towns under their control.
  - Mercenaries, such as Burgundian crossbowmen, Scottish archers, or Saxon foot soldiers.
  - Major (walled) towns such as Coventry, or Nottingham.
  - Ships, allowing transport quickly by sea and to/from ports and off-shore destinations like Ireland (shown in the Avalon Hill edition only), Calais, and the Isle of Man.
- Round cardboard pieces with heraldic emblems that show the nobles' current positions on the map.
- Each player gets a set of markers with different colors and a feudal badge to denote cities & castles under their control.
- Square counters represent ships.

=== Set up ===
Each player is dealt some Crown cards (the number of cards depending on the number of players. For example, in a 3-player game, each player receives 12 cards; in a 6-player game, 6 cards.) For each noble family card received, the players are given the appropriate counters. Each player can then bestow any titles or offices that they also received upon their noble families.

=== Gameplay ===
To begin each player's turn, the player takes an Event card and follows the instructions in the upper half of the card.

==== Movement ====
Nobles can be moved up to five areas across the country (although not through the forest), or an unlimited distance on roads. If the noble wishes to pass through a town that the player does not own, or if a noble enters an area occupied by a noble of another faction, then a battle takes place.

==== Combat ====
Each noble has a combat strength that is augmented by titles, offices, mercenaries, and certain other cards held in the player's hand. A ratio of the strength of the two forces of nobles is tallied, an event card is drawn, and the ratio printed on the card determines if victory is achieved. If a force is defeated, all nobles in that force are captured and may be executed or ransomed by the victorious player. Most of the named places on the map have fortifications with significant additional defensive combat strength, but if a player places nobles inside these places and the town's defenses are breached, this can lead to the potential loss of all defenders.

==== Politics ====
Parliament can be summoned under specific circumstances. Unfilled offices and titles are assigned by Parliament, which can result in quite of lot of power changing hands.

- In the original Philmar version, the person calling the Parliament has a more or less free hand in distributing the titles and offices as they choose, since there is no democracy and no voting.
- In the Avalon Hill version, each noble uses their acquired voting strength in the House of Lords and the House of Commons to decide how to assign the spoils, where a majority vote is required in both Houses to assign any title or office. Nobles who are weak in combat strength can still be strong in either Lords or Commons votes, and vice versa. Those who control the senior members of the York and Lancaster families or the crowned King (or Queen Regent) gain significant additional voting power as well. Those who are enemies on the battlefield may ally in Parliament to distribute valuable offices and titles to bolster their position.

==== Diplomacy ====
One strong player can be brought down by several weaker players working together, and threats, promises, and agreements can be easier ways to get the desired results than by using brute force. Players can trade many types of cards, and agree on future spoils of war or honours awarded. However, no agreement made in the game is binding; supposed allies can change sides at will.

=== Noble and royal deaths ===
When nobles die, they eventually re-enter the game when a new head of a noble family assumes their place.

This is not true of the royal heirs, who are limited to a few specific historical characters, such as Henry VI, Richard, Duke of York, and Margaret of Anjou. These can be taken under control by a player's nobles, and moved about, traded, captured, or executed by them. They are also subject to death by combat or plague.

- In the original Philmar game, the last royal heir to survive must be crowned for the owning player to win.
- In the Avalon Hill edition, it is enough to own the sole surviving royal heir to win.

== Publication history ==
Kingmaker was created by Andrew McNeil in the early 1960s, who unsuccessfully tried to find a publisher for it through the late sixties. He finally managed to interest Philmar in the game, and Kingmaker was published in the UK in 1974. The following year, American game company Avalon Hill published a revised edition in North America. TM Games also released an edition in 1983 that was essentially a re-issue of the Avalon Hill version, as did Gibsons Games the same year.

In 1994, Avalon Hill produced a computer game of Kingmaker that reproduced the look and play of the board game almost exactly, allowing the player to compete with up to five computer-controlled factions.

=== 2022 Edition ===
In 2019 games designer Alan Paull of Surprised Stare Games was contracted by Gibsons Games to develop a new edition of Kingmaker, to be released in 2020. Paull’s priority with the new edition of the game was “[...] On making the play of the game run more smoothly, but with the same feel as the original.”

This new edition of Kingmaker, sometimes referred to as Kingmaker The Second in some advertisements, contained three rules booklets:

1. Kingmaker Classic/ Extended Classic. This booklet was an interpretation of the original ruleset, designed by Andrew McNeil in 1974. It also included optional rules from Kingmaker’s various other editions, as well as rules printed in The General Magazine.
2. Kingmaker The Second. Kingmaker the Second is an alternative way to play Kingmaker. Designed by Alan Paull, this version simplifies many elements of the game to shorten the playtime. An alternative win condition was also added.
3. Kingmaker The Solo Challenge. The solo challenge booklet allows for solitaire-style play. Produced by Steve Froud, this booklet allows a single person to play Kingmaker Classic.

Due to the covid pandemic, the new edition of Kingmaker was delayed until Autumn 2022. The game was released initially to Kickstarter backers, before going on general sale in 2023.

== Reception ==
The UK magazine Games & Puzzles published a number of reviews, starting with one in Issue 40 (September 1975) by John Humphries. After a lengthy examination of the Philmar edition, Humphries found the rules ambiguous, with "a number of omissions and errors." For example, he pointed out that although the Welsh border had an effect on the game, it was not printed on the map. He commented, "Practically every move requires an interpretation of the rules." He concluded by giving the game a poor rating of only 2 out of 6. A year later, the magazine had changed their mind, calling Kingmaker "Probably the best new game to reach the market in the last few years [...] one of those rare games which are as playable with two as it is with up to six (or more.)"

In the June 1976 edition of Airfix Magazine, Bruce Quarrie had several issues with the game, starting with the rules, which he observed "could have been presented in clearer form." He also found that "The course of play seems to be predictable, one side, or alliance, being clearly in the ascendancy after an hour or two with little chance for a recovery by the opposition, unless they are fortunate enough to have luck beyond the law of averages." Quarrie's own experience was that every game ended in a stalemate, and he concluded, "To sum up, Kingmaker might be an excellent game but I cannot be certain of it!"

In his 1977 book The Comprehensive Guide to Board Wargaming, Nicholas Palmer called Kingmaker "a lively multi-player game loosely based on the Wars of the Roses [...] Hexless and very different from the usual wargames in most respects." He warned that the game was "Emphatically not for those seeking a test of skill, " commenting that it "becomes riotous with half a dozen players as nobles get whizzed home to look after local rebellions, plagues lay waste to armies, pretenders to the throne cower in Calais, and sittings of Parliament dish out high offices to powerful factions." Palmer called the Avalon Hill edition a stronger game than the original PhilMar edition, noting that it has "better Parliament rules and other improvements, including some clarification of obscure points."

In Issue 22 of Moves (August–September 1975), Richard Berg called the game components "a stunning physical production." Berg pointed out "two facets that are rarely, if ever, found in wargames. The first is a sense of humor [...] Secondly, Kingmaker forces you [...] to think as if you were a medieval baron, grasping, mercenary, and merciless." Berg concluded, "It is hard to convey my enthusiasm for Kingmaker in print. It has to be played to be appreciated, to be savored like a rare wine [...] All this is in Kingmaker, all this and more: the rich legacy of an era, the color, panache, and, yes, the cruelty of the Middle Ages, all magnified and illuminated by the finest game of the decade ... a class of style and wit."

In the 1980 book The Complete Book of Wargames, game designer Jon Freeman commented that the Avalon Hill version "may be the finest diplomacy-oriented simulation available." He noted, "The action is furious, and while the game is not a truly accurate portrayal of the Wars of the Roses, Kingmaker — far more than most games — imparts a vivid picture of the times." However, although Freeman allowed that the Avalon Hill edition had corrected some "opaque" rules found in the original edition, the Avalon Hill map was smaller and "definitely inferior to the original." Freeman concluded by giving the game an Overall Evaluation of "Excellent", saying, "Kingmaker is one of the finest games on the market."

Games named the Avalon Hill edition one of the Top 100 Games of 1980, calling it "a colorful recreation of the English War of the Roses" but warning players "Beware of plagues, revolts, bloody battles, and alliances between other contenders."

In Issue 4 of Games International, Mike Ohren noted that many games ended in stalemate as two or three powerful factions holed up in impregnable positions, not strong enough to win, but not weak enough to defeat. Ohren suggested a number of rule changes to prevent stalemates.

Kingmaker was chosen for inclusion in the 2007 book Hobby Games: The 100 Best. Game designer Greg Stafford explained, "A game's quality is measured by two things: fun and replayability. Kingmaker ranks way high in both. It is not perfect, but its strengths more than makeup for its weaknesses. The game is fun because it's a multi-player political wargame that is largely abstract, thus lacking a lot of the fussy detail required of a true historical simulation."

== Awards ==
At the 1976 Origins Awards, Kingmaker won the Charles S. Roberts Award for "Best Professional Game of 1975."

== Other recognition ==
A copy of Kingmaker is held in the collection of the Strong National Museum of Play (object 112.6892).

== Other reviews and commentary ==
- Boardgamer Vol.9 No. 1
- Fire & Movement No. 137
- 1981 Games 100 in Games
- The Playboy Winner's Guide to Board Games
- Panzerfaust and Campaign #74
