= Kingmaker (band) =

British indie rock band

- L-R: Myles Howell, Loz Hardy, and John Andrew

Background information
- Origin: Kingston upon Hull, England
- Genres: Indie rock
- Years active: 1990–95
- Labels: Scorch, Chrysalis
- Past members: Loz Hardy; Myles Howell; John Andrew

Kingmaker were a British indie rock group, founded in Kingston upon Hull in 1990.

The group was formed during their gap year by school friends Loz Hardy and Myles Howell. They placed an advertisement for a drummer, and recruited John Andrew who was an ex-travelling puppeteer.

== Early recording career ==
The band began playing and touring, before making their recording debut with The Celebrated Working Man EP. After this they signed up to Chrysalis Records and released a second EP, entitled Waterproof, in 1991.

Their debut album Eat Yourself Whole was released on 7 October 1991. It was well received, and spent three weeks in the UK Albums Chart, reaching a high of No. 29 in October 1991. In addition they released the single "Eat Yourself Whole", which, despite sharing the name of their album, did not appear on the original UK version. It reached the top twenty of the UK Singles Chart.

During 1992, Kingmaker were supported on tour by Radiohead, who had not yet released Pablo Honey, and by Suede, who were on the verge of releasing their first single "The Drowners". On 29 August that year, they appeared on the bill alongside Babes in Toyland, Beastie Boys and Nick Cave and the Bad Seeds at the Pukkelpop festival near Hasselt, Belgium.

They then landed an American recording contract with Chrysalis. Their second album, Sleepwalking, was released on 17 May 1993.

== Animosity with record label ==
Speaking to Hybrid magazine in 2000, Hardy explained that when "Armchair Anarchist", the first single taken from Sleepwalking, failed to break into the Top 40, executives at their record label made several changes that Hardy felt were to the detriment of the band. These changes included re-writing Sleepwalking, to include more commercial-sounding tunes and moving all the publicity in-house. One more aspect that Hardy felt destroyed the band as a creative unit was the record label's decision to introduce formatting of their singles.

"I dunno if you have that over Stateside but [formatting] basically means there would be different b-sides on the 12-inch (2), cassette (1), CD 1 and CD 2 (3 on each). So if the album has, say, 13 songs on it and with three singles that means you're gonna need 40 songs. 40 fucking songs! So the workload is near impossible and plus the fans get ripped left, right and centre to boot. What was also happening was that you did songs for the album and then b-sides but really fucking excellent songs were ending up tucked away third song on CD 2 and no one heard them."

== Band's split up ==
The band rapidly fell out of favour. Their third album To Hell with Humdrum had only a few new songs, and half of the tracks were BBC sessions from Sleepwalking.

Hardy believed the failure of the fourth and final album In the Best Possible Taste was as much a result of the formatting method as it was the changing tides of musical culture.

"By the time we got to our last album we decided that we wanted to do all 40 songs up front and pick the best for the album, but this meant we needed to take a long timeout to write and record. A year and a half it took us. In that time Britpop really happened and blew us out of the water. By the time we got to releasing In The Best Possible Taste we knew we were well past our sell-by date, and I didn't want to keep playing and playing scaling down to smaller and smaller clubs, I found it a depressing notion."

In the Best Possible Taste was released on 17 April 1995. Whilst tracks such as "One False Move" revealed a subtle shift towards urban rockabilly, the band called it quits after touring later the same year.

== Reformation ==
In 2010 the band reformed, minus Hardy, as Kingmaker MMX after re-recording their hit "Armchair Anarchist" for an anti-politics compilation album called Electio Pop on Helen Llewelyn Product 19 Records. The new Kingmaker line-up featured Michael Wright (vocals) Jonee Kemp (lead guitar) and Phil Keech (keyboards), all Hull-based musicians.

== Band members ==
- Loz Hardy (born Lawrence Paul Hardy, 14 September 1970, Manchester) — vocals, guitar
- Myles Howell (born 23 January 1971, Rugby, Warwickshire) — bass guitar
- John Andrew (born John Richard Andrew, 27 May 1963, Kingston upon Hull) — drums.

== UK discography ==
=== Albums ===
Studio albums

- Eat Yourself Whole (1991) – UK Number 29
- Sleepwalking (1993) – UK Number 15
- In the Best Possible Taste (1995) – UK Number 79

Compilations

- To Hell with Humdrum (1993)
- Bloodshot and Fancy Free: The Best And Rest Of (1997)
- Piss Up A Rope (1999)
- Coming Up For Air (2000)
- Ersatz Love (2000)
- Missing In Action (2000)
- Everything Changed 1991 - 1995 (2020) - 5-CD box set of the three studio albums and singles b-sides

=== Singles and EPs ===
- "The Celebrated Working Man" (1991) EP
- "Waterproof EP" (1991) EP
- "Two Headed EP" (1991) EP
- "Idiots at the Wheel" (1992) EP – UK Number 30
- "The Killjoy Was Here EP" (1992) EP – UK Number 15
- "Armchair Anarchist" (1992) – UK Number 47
- "10 Years Asleep" (1993) – UK Number 15
- "Queen Jane" (1993) – UK Number 29
- "Saturday's Not What It Used to Be" (1993) – UK Number 63
- "You and I Will Never See Things Eye to Eye" (1995) – UK Number 33
- "In the Best Possible Taste (Part 2)" (1995) – UK Number 41
