= Jericho Tavern =

Music venue in Oxford, England

The Jericho Tavern
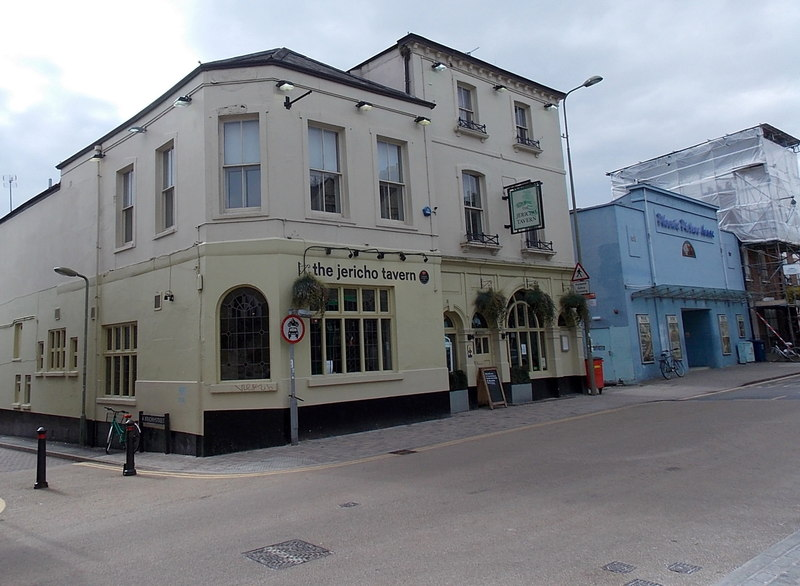

- Location within Central Oxford

General information
- Coordinates: 51°45′35″N 1°15′59″W

The Jericho Tavern is a music venue and pub in the Jericho area of Oxford, England, at 56 Walton Street. In the late 1980s and early 1990s it was an important part of the music scene which produced Ride, Radiohead and Supergrass.

== History ==
Radiohead performed at the Jericho Tavern in 1986 under the name On A Friday. Supergrass secured a record deal after performing a gig there in 1994. Other bands to have performed at the Jericho include Ride, Bastille, Summer Camp, Tennis, Bombay Bicycle Club, Palma Violets, Lianne La Havas, Savages, James Vincent McMorrow, Ben Howard, Foals and Chad Valley.

The Jericho Tavern was bought out in the 1990s by the Firkin chain. It became part of the Scream pub chain, then was restored to a music venue in 2005. Along with several other Oxford pubs, it is now owned by Mitchells & Butlers.

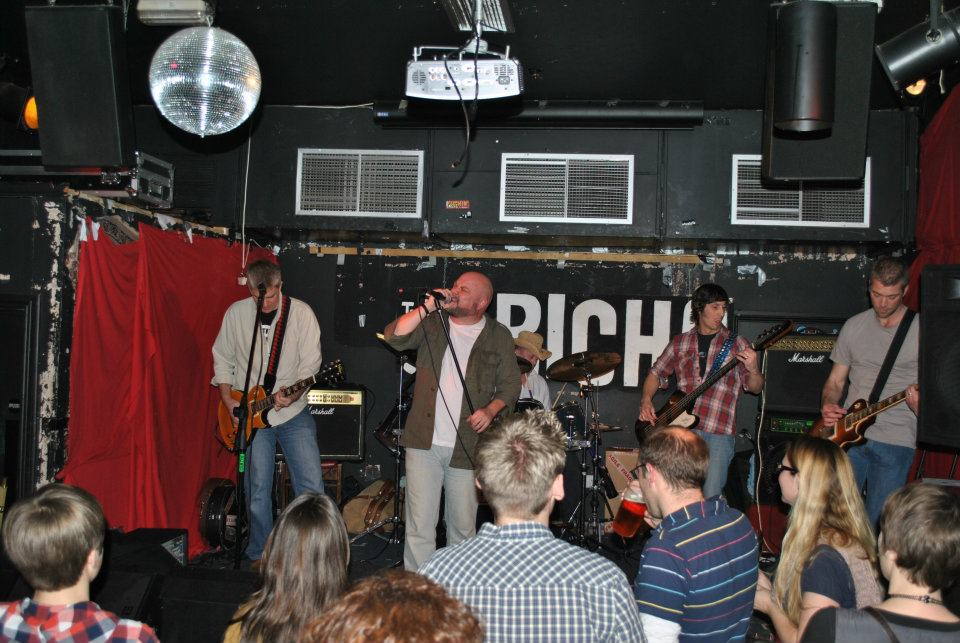
Tush performing at the Jericho Tavern in 2012
