= TKOL =

TKOL may refer to:

- The King of Limbs, a 2011 album by Radiohead
  - The King of Limbs: Live from the Basement, a 2011 live video album of songs from The King of Limbs
  - TKOL RMX 1234567, a 2011 remix album of songs from The King of Limbs
- Tseung Kwan O line, a railway line in Hong Kong
