= A Moon Shaped Pool =

Studio album by Radiohead
- Released: 8 May 2016
- Recorded: 2014–2016
- Studios: La Fabrique, Saint-Rémy-de-Provence, France; RAK, London; Radiohead studio, Oxfordshire
- Genres: Art rock; folk; chamber; ambient; baroque pop; post-rock
- Length: 52:31
- Label: XL
- Producer: Nigel Godrich

Radiohead chronology
The King of Limbs: Live from the Basement (2011)	A Moon Shaped Pool (2016)	OK Computer OKNOTOK 1997 2017 (2017)

Singles from A Moon Shaped Pool
- 1. "Burn the Witch" Released: 3 May 2016; 2. "Daydreaming" Released: 6 May 2016

A Moon Shaped Pool is the ninth studio album by the English rock band Radiohead. It was released digitally on 8 May 2016, with a retail release on 17 June 2016 through XL Recordings. It was produced by Radiohead's longtime collaborator Nigel Godrich.

Radiohead recorded A Moon Shaped Pool in RAK Studios in London, their studio in Oxford, and the La Fabrique studio in Saint-Rémy-de-Provence, France. It features strings and choir arranged by the guitarist Jonny Greenwood and performed by the London Contemporary Orchestra. Several songs, such as "True Love Waits" and "Burn the Witch", were written years earlier. The lyrics address climate change, groupthink and heartbreak. Many critics saw them as a response to the split of the singer, Thom Yorke, from his wife, Rachel Owen. Radiohead's longtime collaborator Stanley Donwood created the abstract cover by exposing his paintings to weather.

Radiohead promoted A Moon Shaped Pool with singles and videos for "Burn the Witch" and "Daydreaming", a viral campaign of postcards and social media posts, and a series of video vignettes. Radiohead toured in 2016, 2017 and 2018, with headline performances at festivals including Glastonbury and Coachella. Their performance in Tel Aviv drew criticism from supporters of the Boycott, Divestment and Sanctions campaign for an international cultural boycott of Israel.

A Moon Shaped Pool was named one of the best albums of the year and decade by many publications. It was the fifth Radiohead album nominated for the Mercury Prize, and was nominated for Best Alternative Music Album and Best Rock Song (for "Burn the Witch") at the 59th Annual Grammy Awards. It topped the charts in several countries, becoming Radiohead's sixth number one on the UK Album Charts, and was a bestseller on vinyl. It is certified platinum in the UK and Canada, and gold in the US, Australia, France and Italy.

== Background ==
Several songs on A Moon Shaped Pool were written years before the recording. Radiohead first performed "True Love Waits" in 1995, and attempted to record it several times, but could not settle on an arrangement. Over the years, it became one of their best-known unreleased songs. Radiohead first worked on "Burn the Witch" in the sessions for Kid A (2000) and again in subsequent album sessions. The songwriter, Thom Yorke, first performed "Present Tense" in a solo set at the UK Latitude Festival in 2009.

During the tour for their eighth album, The King of Limbs (2011), Radiohead performed new material, including the future Moon Shaped Pool tracks "Identikit" and "Ful Stop". On tour in 2012, they recorded two songs at the Third Man Records studio in Nashville, Tennessee, including a version of "Identikit", but discarded the recordings as substandard. After the tour ended that year, Radiohead entered hiatus and the members worked on side projects.

== Recording ==
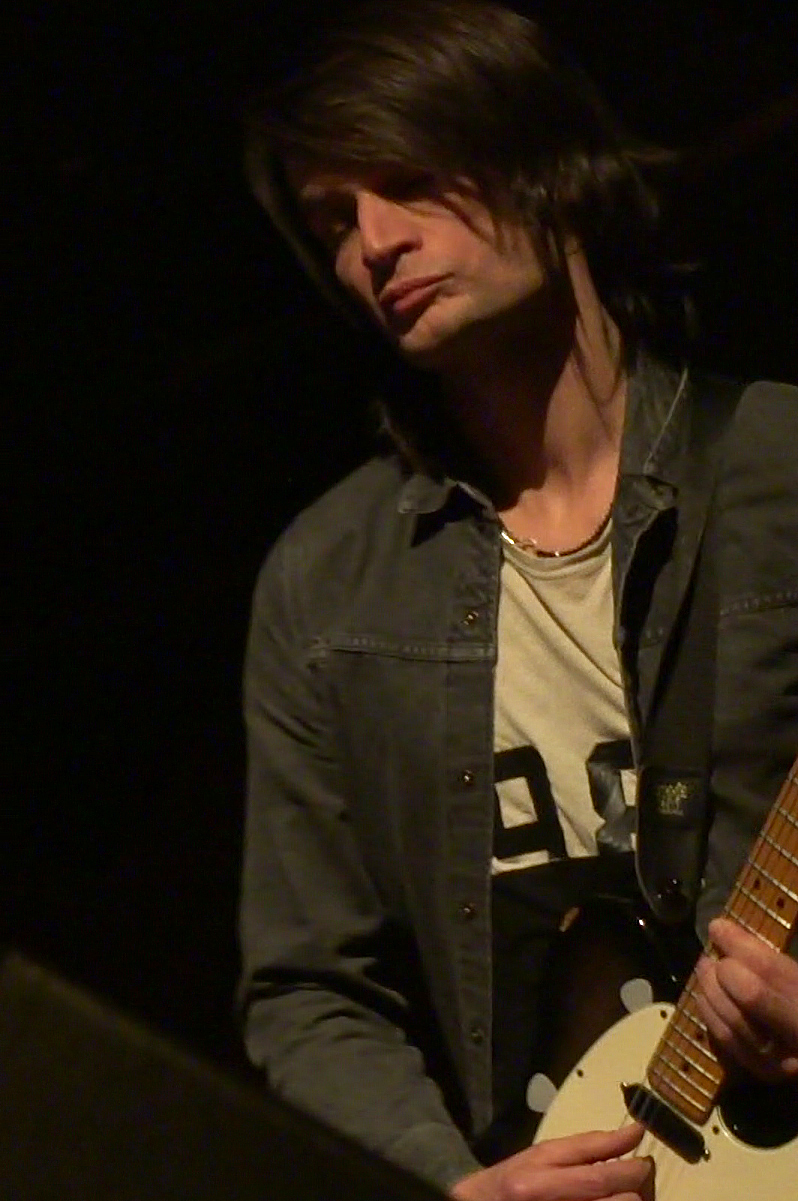
Jonny Greenwood performing in 2015 with the London Contemporary Orchestra, who appear on A Moon Shaped Pool

Radiohead began work on A Moon Shaped Pool with their longtime producer, Nigel Godrich, in their Oxfordshire studio in September 2014. Yorke had prepared few demos and there was no rehearsal period. According to the guitarist Ed O'Brien, "We just went straight into recording ... The sound emerged as we recorded." Radiohead were slow to regain momentum after their break and worked in "fits and starts". They initially worked on songs written by O'Brien, but found that they did not fit Radiohead. O'Brien saved them for his debut solo album, Earth (2020).

The Oxfordshire sessions lasted until Christmas. In 2015, Radiohead spent three weeks in the La Fabrique studio near Saint-Rémy-de-Provence, France, building on their recordings. The studio, originally a 19th-century mill producing art pigment, had been used by musicians including Morrissey and Nick Cave and houses the world's largest vinyl record collection.

Instead of using computers, Godrich recorded to tape with analog multitrack recorders, inspired by Motown and early David Bowie records. This added creative limits, as rerecording a take meant erasing the previous take. According to the bassist, Colin Greenwood, this forced the band to "make decisions in the moment; it's very much the opposite of having your album stored on a terabyte hard drive".

For the introduction to "Daydreaming", Radiohead slowed the tape, creating a pitch-warping effect. The guitarist Jonny Greenwood used the music programming language Max to manipulate the piano on "Glass Eyes". "Identikit" developed from loops of Yorke's vocals recorded during the King of Limbs sessions. The drummer Clive Deamer, who had performed with Radiohead on the King of Limbs tour and appeared on their 2011 double single "The Daily Mail" and "Staircase", played additional drums on "Ful Stop".

The strings and choir sections were arranged by Jonny Greenwood and performed by the London Contemporary Orchestra, with Hugh Brunt as conductor. The orchestra had previously worked with Greenwood on his score for the 2012 film The Master. The strings were recorded at RAK Studios in London. For "Burn the Witch", the players used guitar plectrums rather than bows, creating a percussive effect. Yorke described "Daydreaming", finished early in the La Fabrique sessions, as a breakthrough for the album. Greenwood had the cellists detune their cellos, creating a "growling" sound. Additional string and choir parts were recorded but cut.

Work was interrupted by the recording of "Spectre", commissioned for the 2015 James Bond film. The film producers rejected the song as "too dark". Godrich said: "That fucking James Bond movie threw us a massive curveball. It was a real waste of energy ... In terms of making A Moon Shaped Pool it caused a stop right when we were in the middle of it." In December 2015, at the United Nations Climate Change Conference in Paris, Yorke performed three Moon Shaped Pool songs: "The Numbers" (then known as "Silent Spring"), "Present Tense" and "Desert Island Disk". On Christmas Day, Radiohead released "Spectre" on the audio streaming site SoundCloud. Jonny Greenwood estimated that 80% of the album was recorded in two weeks. After Radiohead finished work in France, Godrich edited and mixed the album in London.

The special edition of A Moon Shaped Pool is dedicated to Godrich's father, Vic Godrich, who died on the day of the recording of the strings for "Burn the Witch", and the drum technician Scott Johnson, who died in the 2012 stage collapse before Radiohead's scheduled show in Downsview Park, Toronto. Yorke's ex-wife, Rachel Owen, died of cancer several months after the album was released. Yorke told Rolling Stone: "There was a lot of difficult stuff going on at the time, and it was a tough time for us as people. It was a miracle that that record got made at all." O'Brien said in 2026: "[It] was so fucking awful to make! The tale of that record is so fucking dark. It casts a long shadow."

== Music ==
A Moon Shaped Pool incorporates art rock, folk, chamber music, ambient music and baroque pop. It combines electronic elements such as drum machines and synthesisers, acoustic timbres such as guitar and piano, and string and choral arrangements, which feature more heavily than on previous Radiohead albums. The Guardian characterised A Moon Shaped Pool as more restrained and "pared back" than Radiohead's earlier work. Jonny Greenwood cited the jazz musician Alice Coltrane as an influence, saying: "It's not jazz piano, exactly, but there's elements of that ... You have big ambition and you get as far as you can with it."

The songs are sequenced alphabetically. Greenwood said this was chosen only because the order worked well. "Burn the Witch" features "pulsating" strings and electronic percussion. "Daydreaming" is an ambient song with a "simple, sad" piano motif, "spooky" backmasked vocals, and electronic and orchestral elements. "Ful Stop" features "malevolent" synthesiser, a "bustle" of rhythms, and phasing guitar arpeggios. "Glass Eyes" has manipulated piano, strings, and lyrics evocative of an "unguarded phone call". "Identikit" has a jam-like opening, choral vocals, and "spacey" electronics, and ends with an "agitated" guitar solo.

"The Numbers" begins as a "loose-limbed, early 70s jam session", with strings reminiscent of Serge Gainsbourg's 1970 album Histoire de Melody Nelson. "Present Tense" is a ballad with bossa nova elements. "Tinker Tailor Soldier Sailor Rich Man Poor Man Beggar Man Thief" features strings, electronic percussion and distorted synthesiser. "True Love Waits" is a piano ballad with polyrhythmic loops and textures. The special edition of A Moon Shaped Pool contains two additional tracks: "Ill Wind", featuring a bossa nova rhythm and "icy" synthesisers, and "Spectre", an orchestral piano ballad.

=== Lyrics ===
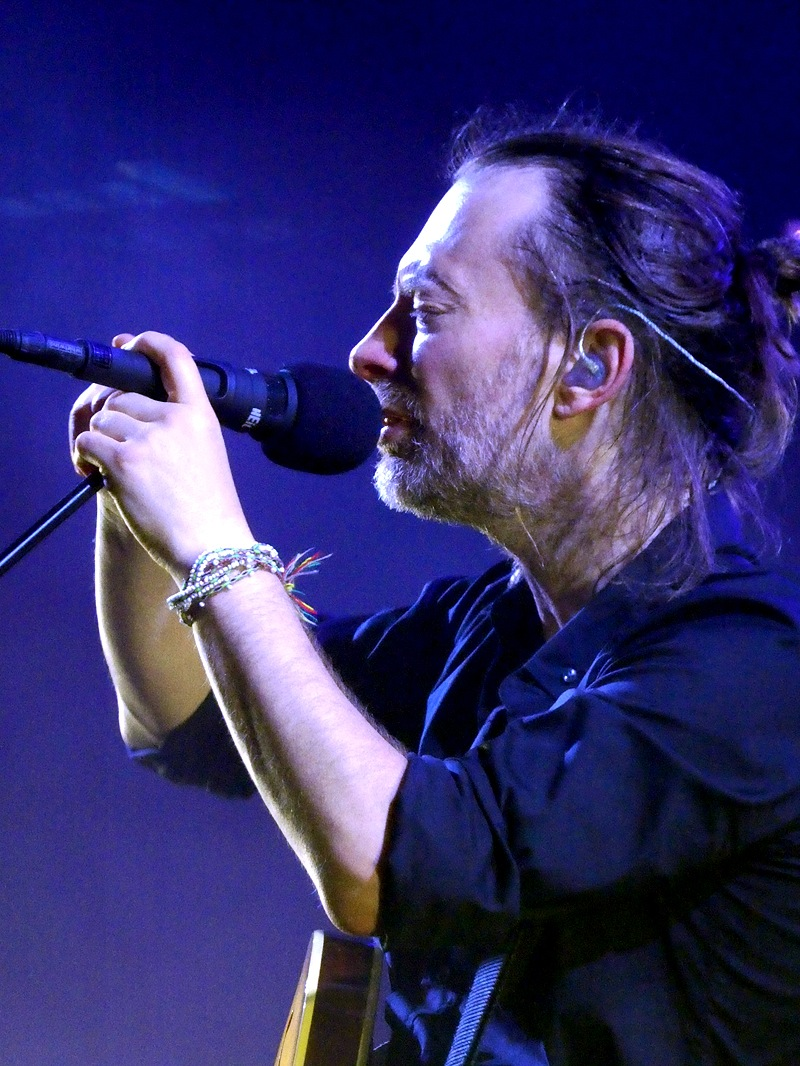
Thom Yorke performing on the Moon Shaped Pool tour in 2016

The lyrics discuss love, forgiveness, and regret with, according to Larson, "a sense that beyond tectonic heartbreak there is an anaemic acceptance that is kind of beautiful if you don't get too sad about it". Several critics felt the lyrics were coloured by Yorke's separation from his partner of almost 25 years, Rachel Owen, noting that the backmasked vocals of "Daydreaming", when reversed, resemble the words "half of my life". Spencer Kornhaber of the Atlantic wrote that A Moon Shaped Pool "makes the most sense when heard as a document of a wrenching chapter for one human being".

Other themes include climate change and call for revolution on "The Numbers", and the dangers of authority and groupthink on "Burn the Witch". Yorke feared that political songs alienated some listeners, but decided it was better than writing "another lovey-dovey song about nothing". He was conscious that lyrics such as "a river running dry" and "the system is a lie" were cliches, but felt there was no other way to state them: "How else are you supposed to say 'the system is a lie'? Why bother hiding it? It's a lie. That's it."

The Guardian wrote that whereas Radiohead's 2003 album Hail to the Thief had addressed the era of Tony Blair and George W. Bush, A Moon Shaped Pool could become the "accidental soundtrack" to the Donald Trump presidency. Of the refrain "one day at a time" from "The Numbers", Yorke said: "One day a time, mate, you will be impeached shortly, mate. You are not a leader, love ... You can't sustain this. It's not gonna work. One day a time. We ain't stupid."

== Artwork ==
The artwork for A Moon Shaped Pool was created by Yorke with the longtime Radiohead collaborator Stanley Donwood. Donwood worked in a barn with speakers connected to the La Fabrique studio where they recorded nearby, allowing their music to influence his art. Wanting to move away from figurative art and create work that was more a product of chance, Donwood initially conceived a robotic device that would squirt paint at canvases, but this proved technically difficult. Instead, he experimented with weather, leaving canvases outdoors to allow the elements to affect the paint. Donwood continued the weathering process in Oxfordshire during the band's winter break, with "completely different results", before photographing the works and editing them in Photoshop with Yorke.

== Release ==
A Moon Shaped Pool special edition

As they had done for previous releases, Radiohead formed a limited liability company, Dawn Chorus, to release A Moon Shaped Pool. It was released as a download on 8 May 2016 on Radiohead's website, online music stores including the iTunes Store and Amazon Music, and some paid streaming services. On Google Play Music, it was accidentally released several hours early.

Ahead of the release, Brian Message, a partner in Radiohead's management company, said he hoped Yorke would allow the album to be released on Spotify. Yorke and Godrich had publicly criticised Spotify in 2013, arguing that it cannot support new artists. Message said Yorke felt Spotify did not have enough paying subscribers. Spotify had been in "advanced discussions" with XL and Radiohead's management to make A Moon Shaped Pool the first album available exclusively to users with premium subscriptions, but no agreement was reached. A Spotify spokesperson, Jonathan Prince, said Spotify and Radiohead had explored "new approaches" but could not overcome technical problems in time for the release. A Moon Shaped Pool was added to Spotify on 17 June.

CD and LP editions were released in Japan on 15 June through Hostess Entertainment and in other countries on 17 June through XL Recordings. Radiohead sold a special edition from their website, which shipped from September. It contains the album on CD and two heavyweight 12" vinyl records, plus an additional CD with two extra tracks: "Ill Wind" and the previously released "Spectre". The special edition features packaging inspired by the albums for 78 rpm shellac records in the La Fabrique studio, additional artwork and an original piece of master tape, less than a second in length, from one of Radiohead's prior recording sessions. As tape degrades over time, Radiohead decided to include it in the special edition rather than have it "end up as landfill". "Ill Wind" was added to streaming services in January 2019. On 20 June 2020, a white vinyl repress of A Moon Shaped Pool was released through independent online record stores for Love Record Stores Day.

== Promotion ==
Radiohead conducted no interviews and did not tour before the release of A Moon Shaped Pool. O'Brien said the band members were not ready to talk about it when it was released: "We didn't want to talk about it being quite hard to make. We were quite fragile, and we needed to find our feet."

On 30 April 2016, days before the album was announced, fans who had previously made orders from Radiohead received embossed cards with lyrics from the lead single, "Burn the Witch". On 1 May, Radiohead deleted all content from their website and social media profiles, replacing them with blank images. Pitchfork interpreted the move as symbolic of Radiohead's re-emergence. Donwood said the idea had been "a way of getting rid of all of that had gone before ... It was like being some sort of evil Bond villain or something, in some lair, pressing buttons ... It was creatively brilliant fun."

After releasing excerpts on Instagram, Radiohead released "Burn the Witch" as a download on 3 May. It was accompanied by a stop-motion animated music video that homages the 1960s Trumptonshire Trilogy children's television programmes and the 1973 horror film The Wicker Man. Three days later, Radiohead released "Daydreaming", accompanied by a video directed by Paul Thomas Anderson, for whom Greenwood had scored several films. The video was projected in 35mm film in select theatres. On the same day, Radiohead announced that their next album would be released online the following Sunday, but did not reveal the title.

BBC Radio 6 Music played A Moon Shaped Pool in its entirety on the day of release. The following week, Radiohead released the first in a series of video vignettes set to clips from the album by artists and filmmakers including Michal Marczak, Tarik Barri, Grant Gee, Adam Buxton, Richard Ayoade, Yorgos Lanthimos and Ben Wheatley. These were followed by a fan competition to create a vignette for "Daydreaming". In September and October, Radiohead released video performances of "Present Tense" and "The Numbers". The videos, directed by Anderson, feature Yorke and Greenwood performing with a CR-78 drum machine.

On 17 June 2016, the day of the album's retail release, participating record shops held a promotional event, "Live From a Moon Shaped Pool". The event featured an audio stream curated by Radiohead, a recording of their performance at the Roundhouse, London, and competitions, artwork and other activities. A participating shop in Istanbul closed following an attack by a gang angered by customers drinking beer and playing music during Ramadan. Radiohead released a statement condemning the attack and offering fans in Istanbul "love and support".

=== Tour ===
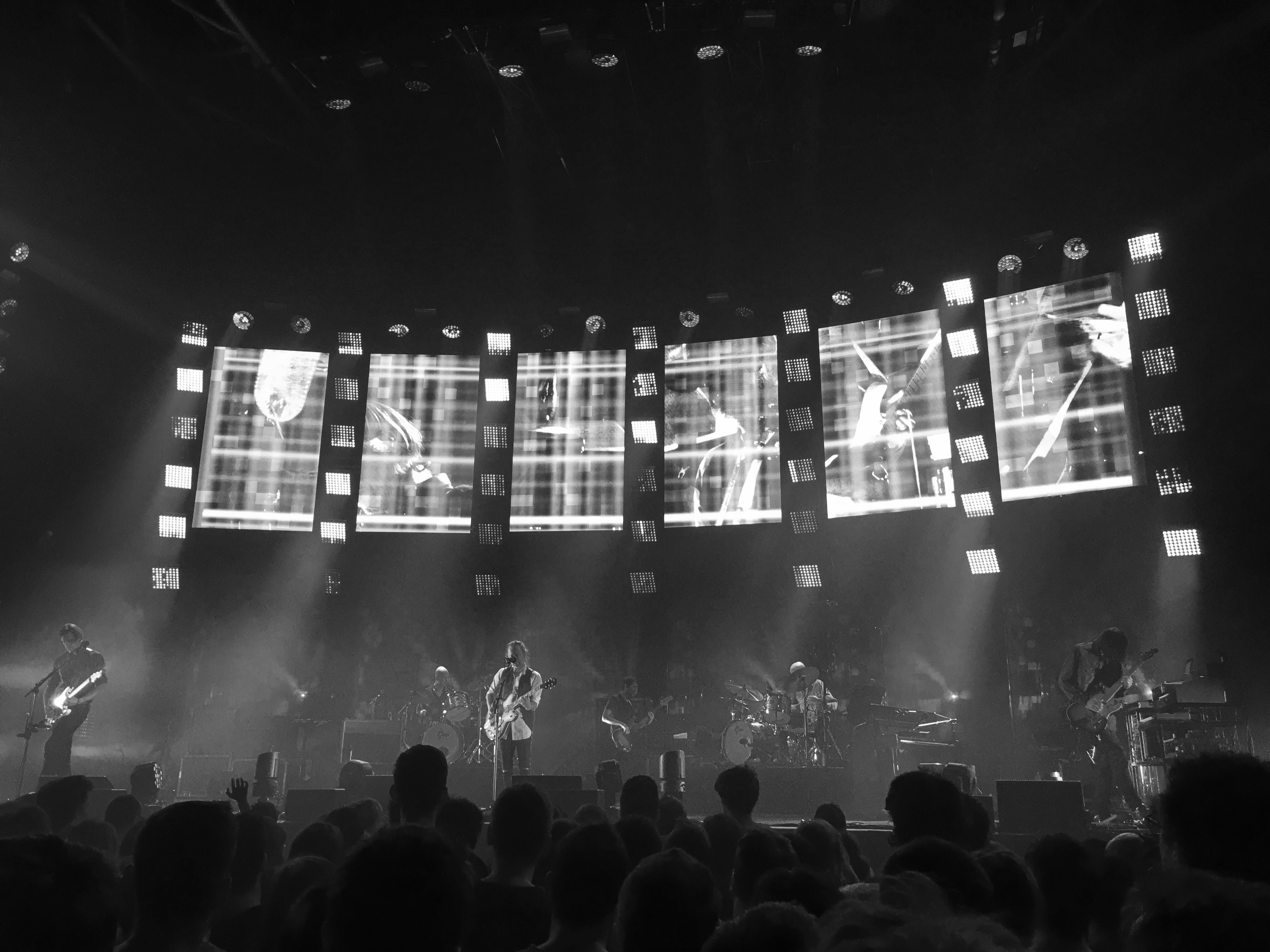
Radiohead performing at the Zénith Paris, 24 May 2016

Radiohead toured Europe, North America and Japan from May to October 2016. As with the King of Limbs tour, Radiohead were joined by a second drummer, Clive Deamer. They began a second US tour in March 2017, culminating in April with a headline slot at the Coachella Festival in California. The tour was supported by James Blake, Oliver Coates, the Jewish-Arabic band Dudu Tassa and the Kuwaitis, and Jonny Greenwood's project Junun.

A European tour followed in June and July with further festival shows, including Radiohead's third headline performance at Glastonbury Festival in the UK. In 2018, Radiohead toured North and South America from April to August, including four nights at Madison Square Garden in New York City. The worldwide tour was the 61st-highest-grossing of 2018, earning more than US$ 28 million. O'Brien was hesitant to join the tour, saying he no longer "resonated" with Radiohead, but said later he was glad to have seen it through.

On 19 July 2017, Radiohead performed in Tel Aviv, disregarding the Boycott, Divestment and Sanctions campaign for an international cultural boycott of Israel. The decision was criticised by creative figures including Roger Waters and Ken Loach, and a petition urging Radiohead to cancel the concert was signed by more than 50 prominent figures. Yorke responded in a statement: "Playing in a country isn't the same as endorsing the government. Music, art and academia is about crossing borders not building them, about open minds not closed ones, about shared humanity, dialogue and freedom of expression." A concert in Glasgow was attended by pro-Palestinian protestors, triggering anger from Yorke on stage. The Israeli musician Dudu Tassa said Radiohead selected his band to support them in the US because they wanted to bring people from Israel after performing in Tel Aviv. After the tour, Radiohead went on hiatus and the members worked on solo projects until their 2025 European tour.

== Sales ==
A Moon Shaped Pool was Radiohead's sixth number one on the UK Albums Chart. It also reached number one in Ireland, Norway and Switzerland, and the top ten in several other countries. It was certified gold in the UK on 24 June 2016 for sales of over 100,000 copies. Following the retail release in June, A Moon Shaped Pool returned to the top of the UK chart with sales of 44,000. Of these, 39,000 were retail copies, including 10,500 vinyl, making it the week's bestselling vinyl record. It was the UK's fourth-bestselling vinyl album of 2016, behind Blackstar by David Bowie, Back to Black by Amy Winehouse and the Guardians of the Galaxy soundtrack. "Burn the Witch" was the year's 26th-bestselling UK vinyl single.

In the US, A Moon Shaped Pool sold 181,000 copies in its first week, reaching number three on the Billboard 200, the week's highest debut. It was Radiohead's best American sales week since the release of their 2003 album Hail to the Thief. With the release of the special edition a few months later, A Moon Shaped Pool rose to number 11 on the Billboard 200 and number one on the vinyl album chart, selling 21,000 vinyl copies in one week. It was certified gold in the US on 9 November 2018, for sales of over 500,000 copies. After the bonus track "Ill Wind" was added to streaming services in September 2019, it reached number eight on the Billboard Alternative Digital Songs chart and number 24 on the Hot Rock Songs chart.

== Critical reception ==
Professional ratings
Aggregate scores
Source	Rating
AnyDecentMusic?	8.4/10
Metacritic	88/100
Review scores
Source	Rating
AllMusic	4/5 stars
The Daily Telegraph	5/5 stars
Entertainment Weekly	A
The Guardian	4/5 stars
The Independent	4/5 stars
NME	4/5
Pitchfork	9.1/10
Q	4/5 stars
Rolling Stone	4.5/5 stars
Spin	9/10

On the review aggregator website Metacritic, A Moon Shaped Pool has a score of 88 out of 100 based on 43 reviews, indicating "universal acclaim". Patrick Ryan of USA Today wrote that "the brooding, symphonic and poignant A Moon Shaped Pool ... was well worth the wait". Chris Gerard of PopMatters felt it was "worthy of Radiohead's peerless catalogue, a rich addition to what is the most vital and important string of rock albums of the last 30 years". Jamieson Cox of the Verge praised the string arrangements and "emotional magnanimity". Andy Beta of Rolling Stone described it as "a haunting, stunning triumph" and Radiohead's "most gorgeous and desolate album", praising its timbres and melodies. The Rolling Stone critic Will Hermes wrote that it was one of Radiohead's "most musically and emotionally arresting albums", and that Yorke's voice "holds the emotional centre, and it's never been more affecting".

Sam Richards of NME described A Moon Shaped Pool as "an album of eerie, elusive beauty that is strange, shimmering and uncertain all at the same time". Stephen Thomas Erlewine wrote for AllMusic that "there's a melancholic comfort to its ebb and flow, a gentle rocking motion that feels comforting; it's a tonic to the cloistered, scattered King of Limbs and even the sleek alienation of Kid A". The Pitchfork editor Jayson Greene felt the album was coloured by Yorke's separation: "The impact of trauma, a sort of car crash of the soul, is palpable. The music here feels loose and unknotted, broken open in the way you can only be after a tragedy." Pitchfork later named "Daydreaming" and "True Love Waits" among the best songs of 2016.

Eric Renner Brown of Entertainment Weekly praised the variety and scale: "By nature, Radiohead albums will always be somewhat epic, but this one is more consistently grandiose than any of the band's releases since 2000's masterpiece Kid A." Jon Pareles, writing for The New York Times, wrote that A Moon Shaped Pool was perhaps Radiohead's "darkest statement – though the one with the band's most pastoral surface". He praised Yorke's vocals and Greenwood's string arrangements, writing: "Both Mr. Yorke and Mr. Greenwood are relentlessly inquisitive listeners, lovers of melody and explorers of idioms, makers of puzzles who don't shy away from emotion." Chris Barton of the Los Angeles Times described A Moon Shaped Pool as "a rich and engrossing listen that somehow finds more undiscovered territory for a band that has built a career on doing just that". MTV's Simon Vozick-Levinson wrote: "A Moon Shaped Pool provides a thrilling answer to the existential concerns that confront any band that's made it this far ... After all this time, hearing these five old friends challenge themselves into a new phase of evolution can still blow even a jaded fan's mind."

In The New York Observer, Justin Joffe wrote that A Moon Shaped Pool was "a stunning display of naked vulnerability and a notable achievement ... Radiohead remain dedicated craftsmen of strange new sonic universes." Like Joffe, Nina Corcoran of Consequence of Sound praised the inclusion of older songs such as "True Love Waits", writing that "Radiohead finally feels connected enough to perform them with meaning ... Waiting to release a studio recording of a song over two decades old allowed Radiohead to peel its words when riper than ever." In The Guardian, Lanre Bakare praised the evolution of "Present Tense" from Yorke's earlier "sketchy guitar number" to "beautifully wrought, bossa nova-tinged ballad".

Mike Diver of the Quietus felt the older songs created the unwelcome feeling of a compilation album, writing: "Certain tracks feel less than fully fleshed out, really given the treatment that their age warrants ... There's simply so little spark here, barely glowing embers and blackened dust where once Radiohead blazed a fascinating, furious trail for others to attempt to follow." The New Republic writer Ryan Kearney likened the album to "taking a warm, occasionally agitated bath; it's soothing and all, but the longer you immerse yourself, the colder it leaves you". He criticised Yorke's lyrics as predictable, and said it was "no coincidence that the only moving song on the album, 'True Love Waits', was written two decades ago". He felt that Yorke was "the most overrated lyricist in music today".

Jamie Milton of DIY felt that A Moon Shaped Pool needed "another breakneck force shock to the system" similar to "Ful Stop", and that it contained unnecessary elements, such as the "over-tinkering echo" of "Present Tense" and the "jagged closing section" of "Decks Dark". Nonetheless, he concluded: "These are gorgeous, human, complete works – some of the best of [Radiohead's] remarkable career." Alexis Petridis of the Guardian criticised the "suffocating gloom" of the lyrics, but felt the album was an improvement over The King of Limbs and that Radiohead had achieved something new.

=== Accolades ===
A Moon Shaped Pool was the fifth Radiohead album nominated for the Mercury Prize, making Radiohead the most shortlisted act in Mercury Prize history. At the 59th Annual Grammy Awards, it was nominated for Best Alternative Music Album and Best Rock Song (for "Burn the Witch"). It was also shortlisted for the Independent Music Companies Association Album of the Year Award for the best album released on an independent European label. Numerous publications named it among the best albums of the year and decade.

Accolades for A Moon Shaped Pool
Publication	Accolade	Rank	Ref.
American Songwriter	Top 50 Albums of 2016	35	
The A.V. Club	The A.V. Club's Top 50 Albums of 2016	2	
BBC Radio 1	The 12 Best Albums of 2016	N/A	
Consequence of Sound	Top 50 Albums of 2016	13	
Entertainment Weekly	The 50 Best Albums of 2016	10	
Esquire	The 30 Best Albums of 2016	3	
Exclaim!	Top 20 Pop & Rock Albums of 2016	1	
Flood Magazine	The Best Records of 2016	2	
The Guardian	The best albums of 2016	10	
Mojo	The Best of 2016	11	
The New York Times	The Best Albums of 2016	4	
Newsweek	Best Albums of 2016	5	
NME	NME's Albums of the Year 2016	22	
Paste	The 50 Best Albums of 2016	6	
Q	The 50 Best Rock Albums of 2016	6	
Pitchfork	The 50 Best Albums of 2016	10	
PopMatters	The 70 Best Albums of 2016	2	
Rolling Stone	50 Best Albums of 2016	6	
The Skinny	Top 50 Albums of 2016	11	
Slant	The 25 Best Albums of 2016	1	
Spin	The 50 Best Albums of 2016	8	
Stereogum	The 50 Best Albums of 2016	13	
The Sunday Times	100 Best Records of the Year	1	
Time	The Top 10 Best Albums	6	
Uncut	Top 50 Best Albums of 2016	2	
Under the Radar	Top 100 Albums of 2016	2	
Variance Magazine	50 Best Albums of 2016	14	
The Village Voice	2016 Pazz & Jop Critics' Poll	7	
Albumism	The 110 Best Albums of the 2010s	N/A	
Aquarium Drunkard	Decade / 2010–19	N/A	
Crack Magazine	The Top Albums of the Decade	69	
NME	Greatest Albums of the Decade	59	
Paste	The 100 Best Album of the 2010s	17	
Pitchfork	The 200 Best Albums of the 2010s	128	
Rolling Stone	The 100 Best Albums of the 2010s	22	
Slant	The 100 Best Albums of the 2010s	12	
Sputnikmusic	Top 100 Albums of the 2010s	13	
Stereogum	The 100 Best Albums of the 2010s	59	
Treble	The 150 Top Albums of the 2010s	11	
The Young Folks	Top 50 Albums of the 2010s	49	

== Track listing ==
All tracks are written by Radiohead.

A Moon Shaped Pool track listing
No.	Title	Length
1.	"Burn the Witch"	3:40
2.	"Daydreaming"	6:24
3.	"Decks Dark"	4:41
4.	"Desert Island Disk"	3:44
5.	"Ful Stop"	6:07
6.	"Glass Eyes"	2:52
7.	"Identikit"	4:26
8.	"The Numbers"	5:45
9.	"Present Tense"	5:06
10.	"Tinker Tailor Soldier Sailor Rich Man Poor Man Beggar Man Thief"	5:03
11.	"True Love Waits"	4:43
Total length:		52:31

== Personnel ==
Adapted from the album liner notes.

Radiohead

- Colin Greenwood
- Jonny Greenwood
- Ed O'Brien
- Philip Selway
- Thom Yorke

Production

- Nigel Godrich – production, mixing, engineering
- Sam Petts-Davies – engineering
- Maxime LeGuil – assistant engineering at La Fabrique Studio
- Robert C. Ludwig – mastering at Gateway Mastering
- Tim Plank – studio crew
- Graeme Stewart – studio crew
- Michelle Shearer – studio crew

Artwork and design

- Stanley Donwood
- Thom Yorke, credited as Doktor Tchock

Additional musicians

- Clive Deamer – additional drums on "Ful Stop"
- London Contemporary Orchestra – strings, female chorus
  - Hugh Brunt – conducting
  - Galya Bisengalieva – violin
  - Eloisa Fleur Thom – violin
  - Alanna Tonetti Tieppo – violin
  - Mira Benjamin – violin
  - Oliver Coates – cello
  - Claire O'Connell – cello
  - Max Ruisi – cello
  - Gregor Riddell – cello
  - Christopher Graves – cello
  - Dave Brown – double bass
  - Robert Ames – viola
  - Rebecca Jones – viola
  - Ian Anderson – viola
  - Charlotte Bonneton – viola
  - Cerian Holland – choir
  - Josephine Stephenson – choir
  - Harriet Armston-Clarke – choir
  - Catherine Harrison – choir
  - Chrysanthemum Bear – choir
  - Bethany Horak-Hallett – choir
  - Sophie Gallagher – choir
  - Judy Brown – choir
  - Emma Lewis – choir
  - Harriet Hougham Slade – choir
  - Daisy Chute – choir
  - Rose Martin – choir
  - Martha McLorinan – choir

== Charts ==
=== Weekly charts ===
Weekly chart performance for A Moon Shaped Pool
Chart (2016)	Peak position
Australian Albums (ARIA)	2
Austrian Albums (Ö3 Austria)	4
Belgian Albums (Ultratop Flanders)	1
Belgian Albums (Ultratop Wallonia)	4
Canadian Albums (Billboard)	2
Danish Albums (Hitlisten)	5
Dutch Albums (Album Top 100)	2
Finnish Albums (Suomen virallinen lista)	3
French Albums (SNEP)	5
German Albums (Offizielle Top 100)	3
Greek Albums (IFPI)	6
Hungarian Albums (MAHASZ)	22
Irish Albums (IRMA)	1
Italian Albums (FIMI)	2
Japanese Albums (Oricon)	6
New Zealand Albums (RMNZ)	2
Norwegian Albums (VG-lista)	1
Polish Albums (ZPAV)	9
Portuguese Albums (AFP)	1
Scottish Albums (Official Charts)	1
South Korean Albums (Gaon)	15
South Korean International Albums (Gaon)	2
Spanish Albums (Promusicae)	4
Swedish Albums (Sverigetopplistan)	3
Swiss Albums (Schweizer Hitparade)	1
UK Albums (Official Charts)	1
US Billboard 200	3
US Top Alternative Albums (Billboard)	1
US Top Rock Albums (Billboard)	1

=== Year-end charts ===
2016 year-end chart performance for A Moon Shaped Pool
Chart (2016)	Position
Australian Albums (ARIA)	32
Belgian Albums (Ultratop Flanders)	19
Belgian Albums (Ultratop Wallonia)	35
Dutch Albums (MegaCharts)	24
French Albums (SNEP)	78
Icelandic Albums (Plötutíóindi)	100
Italian Albums (FIMI)	45
Japan Hot Albums (Billboard Japan)	92
Japanese Albums (Oricon)	98
New Zealand Albums (RMNZ)	38
South Korean International Albums (Gaon)	26
Spanish Albums (PROMUSICAE)	89
Swiss Albums (Schweizer Hitparade)	21
UK Albums (OCC)	28
US Billboard 200	73
US Alternative Albums (Billboard)	6
US Independent Albums (Billboard)	1
US Top Rock Albums (Billboard)	6

2017 year-end chart performance for A Moon Shaped Pool
Chart (2017)	Position
Belgian Albums (Ultratop Flanders)	135

== Certifications ==
Certifications for A Moon Shaped Pool
Region	Certification	Certified units/sales
Australia (ARIA)	Gold	35,000^{^}
Canada (Music Canada)	Platinum	80,000^{‡}
France (SNEP)	Gold	54,800
Italy (FIMI)	Gold	25,000^{*}
United Kingdom (BPI)	Platinum	300,000^{‡}
United States (RIAA)	Gold	500,000^{‡}
Summaries
Worldwide	—	1,100,000
^{*} Sales figures based on certification alone.^{^} Shipments figures based on certification alone.^{‡} Sales+streaming figures based on certification alone.

== Release history ==
Release history for A Moon Shaped Pool
Region	Date	Label	Format	Catalogue no.
Worldwide	8 May 2016	XL	Download; Streaming	XLDA790
Worldwide	17 June 2016	XL	CD; Vinyl; White vinyl	XLCD790 / XLLP790 / XLLP790X
Japan	15 June 2016	Hostess Entertainment	CD; Vinyl	BGJ-5106
