= Ill Wind =

Ill Wind may refer to:

- Ill Wind (film), a 2007 French film

== Music ==
- "Ill Wind" (1934 song), a song by Harold Arlen and Ted Koehler
- "Ill Wind" (Radiohead song), 2019
- "Ill Wind", a song from the 1963 revue At the Drop of Another Hat

== Literature ==
- Ill Wind, a 1995 book written by Kevin J. Anderson and Doug Beason
- Ill Wind, a 1995 book written by Nevada Barr
- Star Trek: The Next Generation – Ill Wind, a Star Trek four-issue comic book limited series published by DC Comics (November 1995–February 1996)
