= These Are My Twisted Words =

2009 single by Radiohead

Single by Radiohead
- Released: 17 August 2009
- Genre: Alternative rock; experimental rock; krautrock
- Length: 5:31
- Label: Self-released
- Songwriter: Radiohead
- Producer: Nigel Godrich

Radiohead singles chronology
"Harry Patch (In Memory Of)" (2009)	"These Are My Twisted Words" (2009)	"Supercollider" / "The Butcher" (2011)

Licensed audio
- "These Are My Twisted Words" on YouTube

"These Are My Twisted Words" is a song by the English rock band Radiohead. It was released via BitTorrent on 12 August 2009, possibly by Radiohead. On 17 August, Radiohead released it as a free download on their website. Several critics likened the song to krautrock.

== Release ==
On 12 August 2009, "These Are My Twisted Words" appeared unannounced on What.CD, a BitTorrent tracker. A text file included in the torrent file contained ASCII art, a cryptic poem and a reference to a release date of 17 August. Commentators including the Guardian and Rolling Stone speculated that Radiohead had "leaked" the song following the unconventional pay-what-you-want release of their 2007 album In Rainbows.

On 17 August, Radiohead released "These Are My Twisted Words" as a free download from their website and through a torrent file hosted by Mininova. The download included several pieces of artwork by Yorke and the longtime Radiohead collaborator Stanley Donwood, with the suggestion to print them on tracing paper. In a blog post announcing the song, the guitarist Jonny Greenwood said it had been recently completed and made no mention of the torrent. Radiohead performed "These Are My Twisted Words" on their 2012 King of Limbs tour.

The text file included in the original torrent contained the phrase "Wall of Ice", triggering speculation that it was the title of an upcoming Radiohead EP. The phrase "wall of eyes" later appeared in promotional materials for Radiohead's next album, The King of Limbs (2011). More than a decade later, the title was used for the album Wall of Eyes by the Radiohead side project the Smile.

== Composition ==
"These Are My Twisted Words" is in quintuple meter. It opens with a motorik beat from the drummer, Philip Selway, before Yorke's vocal enters. Daniel Kreps of Rolling Stone noted a krautrock influence and likened it to the In Rainbows track "Weird Fishes / Arpeggi". Bill Bradley of Vanity Fair said it had a "signature eerie Radiohead sound". Matthew Schnipper of The Fader described it as a "simple song" with "a plodding, stubborn forward spirit".

== Reception ==
Brian Parks of PopMatters gave "These Are My Twisted Words" seven out of ten, describing it as "the most recent in a long line of unconventionally beautiful songs for which Radiohead is renowned". Bradley of Vanity Fair wrote that fans would enjoy it. However, Ryan Dombal of Pitchfork wrote that its "nauseous guitars, featherweight motorik beat and vaguely whiny lyrics almost read as parody" and concluded that it "isn't as enticing as its method of distribution". In 2016, Rolling Stone included "These Are My Twisted Words" on its list of "20 insanely great Radiohead songs only hardcore fans know".
