= In Memory Of =

In Memory Of may refer to:

- In Memory Of (Law & Order), an episode of the TV series Law & Order
- In Memory Of... (D:Ream album), 2011
- In Memory Of (Stanley Turrentine album)
- In Memory Of ... (ballet), a ballet by the New York City Ballet
- "In Memory Of..." (song), a 2012 sing by Drowning Pool

== See also ==
- "Harry Patch (In Memory Of)", a song by Radiohead
