= Spectre (song) =

2015 song by Radiohead

Song by Radiohead
- A-side: "Burn the Witch"
- Released: 25 December 2015
- Studio: Air Studios, London
- Genre: Orchestral pop
- Length: 3:19
- Label: Self-released; XL
- Producer: Nigel Godrich

Licensed audio
- "Spectre" on YouTube

Alternate cover
- Original SoundCloud release cover

"Spectre" is a song by the English rock band Radiohead, released on 25 December 2015. It was produced by Nigel Godrich.

Radiohead recorded "Spectre", an orchestral ballad, for the 2015 James Bond film Spectre after another song they had submitted, "Man of War", was rejected. However, the producers instead used "Writing's on the Wall" by Sam Smith.

Radiohead released "Spectre" as a free download, their first release since 2011. It was also included as a B-side on the 2016 single "Burn the Witch" and the special edition of A Moon Shaped Pool. It received positive reviews.

== Writing and recording ==
Radiohead were approached by the James Bond production team to write the theme for the upcoming Bond film Spectre (2015). The director, Sam Mendes, and the James Bond actor, Daniel Craig, were both Radiohead fans. In July 2015, the bookmaker William Hill suspended bets after a customer placed £15,000 at ten-to-one odds on Radiohead, suspecting insider knowledge.

Radiohead first submitted "Man of War", an unreleased song written in the 1990s, which the singer, Thom Yorke, had once described as an homage to Bond themes. The Spectre producers liked "Man of War", but rejected it when they discovered it had not been written for the film and was therefore ineligible for the Academy Award for Best Original Song.

Radiohead suspended work on their ninth album, A Moon Shaped Pool (2016), to record another song for the film, "Spectre", in Air Studios in London. However, the producers instead used "Writing's on the Wall" by Sam Smith. The lead guitarist, Jonny Greenwood, said they felt "Spectre" was "too dark". Yorke said the decision not to use it was "just politics as far as I can tell".

The Bond producer Barbara Broccoli said "Spectre" arrived too late to be used, and that the team had already created the title sequence using "Writing's on the Wall". Mendes attempted to use "Spectre" elsewhere in the film, but decided its lyrics made it distracting. He described the situation as "an utter nightmare ... We had this beautiful song and we weren't able to use it. But it's somehow cooler for Radiohead to have written a song that wasn't used."

Radiohead's producer, Nigel Godrich, said the experience was a "real waste of energy" that disrupted work on A Moon Shaped Pool. Greenwood said Radiohead were free to finish and release "Spectre" as they wanted, and so "that side of it was really positive ... We get to have it back and it's ours and we got to put it out. We're really, really proud of it."

== Composition ==
"Spectre" is an orchestral ballad that features Yorke's falsetto, strings, "jerky" piano chords and jazz-like drums. Pitchfork likened it to Radiohead's 2001 single "Pyramid Song", and said it had the "melodrama" of a Bond theme with "only a hint of the kitsch". Variety wrote that "Spectre" had "Radiohead's signature moody sound, with a sombre sweeping grandeur".

== Release ==
Radiohead released "Spectre" on the audio platform SoundCloud on Christmas Day 2015. Yorke announced the song on Twitter, writing: "Last year we were asked to write a tune for Bond movie Spectre. Yes we were. It didn't work out ... but became something of our own which we love very much. As the year closes we thought you might like to hear it. Merry Christmas." It was Radiohead's first release since the 2011 single "The Daily Mail" / "Staircase". "Spectre" was included as the B-side on Radiohead's 2016 vinyl single "Burn the Witch". It was also included as a bonus track on the special edition of A Moon Shaped Pool.

== Live performances ==
In 2018, Yorke performed "Spectre" at a solo show and with Radiohead on their Moon Shaped Pool tour. In August 2026, the BBC Concert Orchestra, conducted by Daniel Bartholomew-Poyser, performed "Spectre" at the BBC Proms as part of a concert of Bond music.

== Reception ==
Pitchfork named "Spectre" the week's "Best New Music", finding that it was "one of the finest Radiohead songs in some years, much more than a one-off curiosity". Variety wrote that it "might have fit well into the Bond song canon". Chris DeVille of Stereogum picked "Spectre" as one of the week's best songs, writing that it was "beautiful" and a reminder that "Radiohead still have life left in them". After "Writing's on the Wall" won the Golden Globe Award for Best Original Song at the 73rd Golden Globe Awards the following week, DeVille wrote that "Spectre" was "the more masterful of the two tracks". In 2020, The Guardian named "Spectre" the 38th-best Radiohead song, writing: "Thom Yorke is persuasive – if not exactly suave – in character as the secret agent, but credit Jonny Greenwood, as we often must, with its emotive thwack."

== Release history ==
Region	Date	Label	Format	Catalogue no.
Worldwide	25 December 2015	XL	Download	-
United States	16 May 2016	XL	7"	407917
