= Harry Patch (In Memory Of) =

2009 single by Radiohead

Single by Radiohead
- Released: 5 August 2009
- Recorded: 2009
- Genre: Chamber pop, chamber music
- Length: 5:33
- Label: Self-released
- Songwriters: Colin Greenwood; Jonny Greenwood; Ed O'Brien; Philip Selway; Thom Yorke

Radiohead singles chronology
"Nude" (2008)	"Harry Patch (In Memory Of)" (2009)	"These Are My Twisted Words" (2009)

Licensed audio
- "Harry Patch (In Memory Of)" on YouTube

"Harry Patch (In Memory Of)" is a song by the English alternative rock band Radiohead. The song is a tribute to the British supercentenarian Harry Patch, the last surviving soldier to have fought in the trenches during World War I. Radiohead self-released it on 5 August 2009 as a downloadable single for £1 from their website, with all proceeds donated to the Royal British Legion. It was added to streaming services on Remembrance Day 2016.

Recorded in an abbey shortly before Patch's death, the song consists of Thom Yorke's vocals and a string arrangement composed by Jonny Greenwood. The lyrics are from the perspective of a soldier in the First World War, and include modifications of quotations from Patch. While reception was generally positive, with many critics praising the song's message, others criticised it as too sombre. The Patch family voiced their approval of the message and the charitable use of the proceeds.

== Recording ==
According to a post by Yorke on Radiohead's blog, Dead Air Space, "Harry Patch (In Memory Of)" was inspired by a "very emotional" 2005 interview with Harry Patch on the Today programme on BBC Radio 4. Yorke wrote that "the way he talked about war had a profound effect on me". The song was recorded live in an abbey, a few weeks before Patch died on 25 July 2009, aged 111.

== Composition ==
"Harry Patch (In Memory Of)"
Audio sample featuring the prominent orchestration in the main section and the beginning of the song's bridge.

"Harry Patch (In Memory Of)" has no standard rock instrumentation, and instead comprises Yorke's vocals and an orchestral string arrangement composed by Radiohead guitarist Jonny Greenwood. Strings introduce the song with a series of repeated arpeggiated notes, which continue as Yorke's singing begins. There is a bridge described as a "grim, delicately furious peak" halfway through.

The Pitchfork writer Mark Richardson compared the track to Gavin Bryars' 1971 composition Jesus' Blood Never Failed Me Yet and Samuel Barber's 1936 Adagio for Strings. Critics from Rolling Stone, The Village Voice, and The Daily Telegraph drew comparisons to Greenwood's score to the film There Will Be Blood; however, Jim Fusilli of The Wall Street Journal said the works "[bear] no resemblance". Andrea Rice of American Songwriter wrote that the song's style was far removed from "anything emblematic of Radiohead".

While Radiohead has expressed anti-war sentiments in the past—including a contribution to the 1995 War Child charity compilation The Help Album—"Harry Patch (In Memory Of)" marks the first time that a Radiohead song explicitly refers to war in its lyrics, marking a departure from Yorke's typically abstract writing. The lyrics are from the perspective of a soldier in the midst of First World War trench warfare. Several lines, including "Give your leaders each a gun and let them fight it out themselves" and "The next will be chemical, but they will never learn", are adapted from quotations by Patch. Luke Lewis of NME and Simon Vozick-Levinson of Entertainment Weekly likened the lyrics to Wilfred Owen's First World War-era poem Dulce et Decorum est. Rice referred to Yorke's vocals as an "innocent and youthful falsetto"; NME said his singing is "subdued to the point where you really need to read the lyrics".

== Release ==
"Harry Patch (In Memory Of)" premiered on BBC Radio 4's Today programme on the morning of 5 August 2009, one day before Patch's burial. It became available for purchase later that day on Radiohead's online store W.A.S.T.E. as a download for £1, or US$1.68 at the time of release. All proceeds are donated to the Royal British Legion, a charity supporting those who are serving or have served in the British Armed Forces. The track could also be streamed from the Today section of BBC Online, where it was posted along with a description and the lyrics. Based on internet traffic data for Radiohead's website taken from Alexa Internet, The Guardian's Chris Salmon believed that if the single had been released conventionally it would have likely entered the top ten of the UK singles chart top ten.

The unconventional release, carried out "in classic Radiohead fashion" according to Mehan Jayasuriya of PopMatters, was praised by The Guardian's John Harris: "Welcome, once again, to the future of popular music: no need for albums, or marketing campaigns, or grand announcements—just a song by Radiohead, recorded mere weeks ago, premiered on yesterday's Today programme, and now available to download." Caleb Garning of Wired noted the song's "abrupt creation" and the sudden announcement of their album The King of Limbs as part of Radiohead's move towards an unpredictable release schedule for new recorded material. In a feature for The Quietus, Wyndham Wallace argued that the release was in line with broader music industry trends towards "instant gratification", initiated by the digital release of Radiohead's previous album, In Rainbows (2007). For Remembrance Day on 11 November 2016, Radiohead added "Harry Patch (In Memory Of)" to streaming services.

== Reception ==
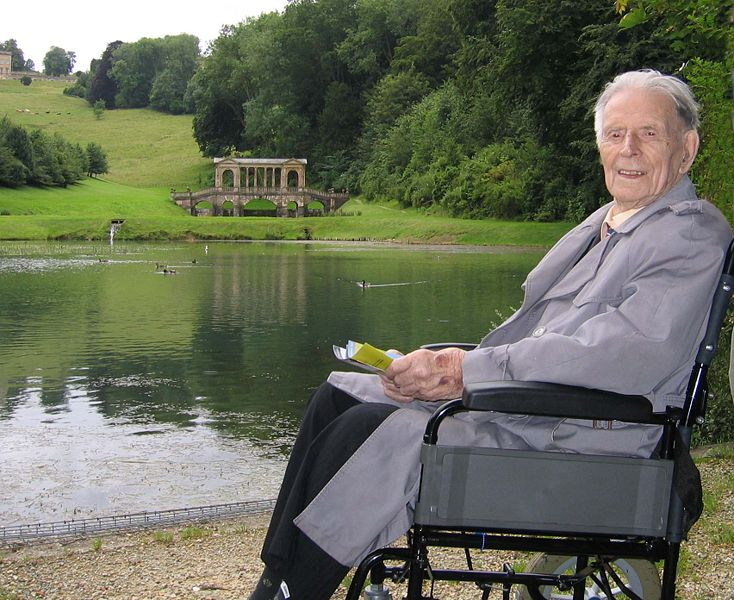
"Harry Patch (In Memory Of)" was written as a tribute to Harry Patch, pictured above in 2007.

Reception to the song was generally positive. Jim Fusilli of The Wall Street Journal described it as "a masterly achievement", highlighting Yorke's "eerie" vocals and Greenwood's "elegant" arrangement, and concluded that "with Radiohead, the unexpected isn't merely a ploy. It's a new approach to modern music that's often thrilling." Dan Martin of The Guardian described the song as "a desolate lament over bleak, circling strings that build as the song progresses" and wrote that "considering the solemnity of the subject, the song finds Radiohead at their most understated and serene". Vozick-Levinson of Entertainment Weekly called the song "a gorgeous anti-war ballad" and wrote: "Needless to say, it's very much worth any Radiohead fan's pound, regardless of the exchange rate." NME named the track one of the ten best of the week and called it an "elegiac", "affecting, slow-burn statement" that "rather than hectoring, [...] states simply the horrors of war that Patch spoke so movingly about".

Critic Allan Raible of ABC News compared the song to the earlier Radiohead songs "How to Disappear Completely" and "Pyramid Song" and called it "one of the most beautiful compositions Thom Yorke and company have ever released". Richardson gave it seven out of ten in Pitchfork, and wrote that while it could be criticised as "a noble but failed experiment, overly maudlin and sentimental even if it is surface-level pretty", the "simplicity and unsubtle affect, especially coming from this band, wind up being strengths." In a later column, Richardson defended the song from charges of excessive sentimentality and attributed the emotional success to its severe subject, death: "If these pieces were connected to thoughts of breaking up with a girlfriend or getting fired or lamenting cold weather or any of a million other of life's tragedies, they wouldn't work, at least not in the same way. They need that huge weight [of death] [...] on the other end to balance them out." Kyle Anderson of MTV.com called the song a "slow, florid affair" and placed its "typically dark" lyrics in the context of Radiohead's previous political activism, such as their participation in the MTV EXIT campaign against human trafficking.

Rob Harvilla of Village Voice wrote that the track offered "nothing terribly earth-shattering" and thought that "the contrast between Thom's dolphin-soothing calm and lyrics like 'I've seen hell upon this earth/The next one will be chemical/But they will never learn' might just ruin your lunch". David Malitz of The Washington Post wrote that "it's a little too Sigur Ros-y and doesn't really go anywhere" but acknowledged it "kept my interest for five and half minutes". In 2020, the Guardian named "Harry Patch (In Memory Of)" the 24th-greatest Radiohead song, writing: "A later-career treasure, Radiohead’s tribute to the last surviving combat soldier of the first world war shows how much ground they have barely touched." The Times critic Jonathan Dean wrote that the cover art was more memorable than the song, and that the song was more powerful with the artwork in mind.

The Royal British Legion chairman, Peter Cleminson, said: "Radiohead has picked up the torch from Harry Patch to hold it high. Radiohead uses Harry's own words to remind us of the horrors of war, and we believe Harry would be pleased." Patch's grandson Roger Patch said:

Our family is very touched that Radiohead has reached out to its followers and especially the younger generation through the single that echoes Harry's interview in 2005. Harry loved music and would be 100 percent behind Radiohead in raising awareness of the suffering of conflict—not least the futility of it—in a way that can also benefit the Legion. It's a great idea which we support wholeheartedly.

== See also ==
- Last Post, a poem in memory of Patch by British poet laureate Carol Ann Duffy
- List of anti-war songs
