= Lotus Flower (song) =

2011 promotional single by Radiohead

Promotional single by Radiohead

from the album The King of Limbs
- Released: 16 February 2011
- Recorded: 2009–2010
- Genre: Electropop
- Length: 5:00
- Label: Ticker Tape; XL
- Songwriters: Colin Greenwood; Jonny Greenwood; Ed O'Brien; Philip Selway; Thom Yorke
- Producer: Nigel Godrich

Music video
- "Lotus Flower" on YouTube

"Lotus Flower" is a song by the English rock band Radiohead, released as the lead single from their eighth studio album, The King of Limbs (2011). It features Thom Yorke's falsetto over syncopated beats and a synthesiser bassline. Its music video, featuring Yorke's erratic dancing, attracted millions of views and inspired an internet meme.

Though it was not released as a commercial single, "Lotus Flower" entered charts including the UK singles chart, the US Alternative Songs chart, and the Billboard Japan Hot 100. It received positive reviews and was nominated for Best Rock Performance, Best Rock Song and Best Music Video at the 54th Annual Grammy Awards.

== Background ==
The Radiohead singer, Thom Yorke, debuted a solo version of "Lotus Flower" at the Echoplex in Los Angeles on 2 October 2009, while on tour with his band Atoms for Peace. On 24 January 2010, Radiohead suspended work on their album The King of Limbs to perform at the Music Box Theater, Hollywood, to raise funds for Oxfam responding to the 2010 Haiti earthquake. At the show, Yorke performed "Lotus Flower" alone on acoustic guitar. The show was released free online in December 2010 as Radiohead for Haiti.

== Composition ==
"Lotus Flower"
This sample of the song contains part of the chorus and title lyric.

"Lotus Flower" has a more traditional structure than other songs on The King of Limbs. According to Luke Lewis of NME, it combines the electronic instrumentation of Radiohead's album Kid A (2000) with the "sonic warmth" of their album In Rainbows (2007). It features Yorke's "Prince-like" falsetto over syncopated beats and a "propulsive" synthesiser bassline. Though the song is in common time, the handclaps are in quintuple meter, creating a metric dissonance.

Lewis described "Lotus Flower" as "soulful and funky". In Rolling Stone, Jon Dolan likened it to an "icy" version of the funk musician James Brown, and said it "set the tone for Radiohead's funkiest record". Lewis speculated that the lyrics were about transcendence, self-effacement and "the magic of losing yourself in music and the senses".

== Release ==
"Lotus Flower" was released as a promotional single from Radiohead's eighth studio album, The King of Limbs, in 2011. Pitchfork wrote that it was selected "presumably for having a chorus and not being a ballad". Though it was not released as a commercial single, it entered charts including the UK singles chart, the US Alternative Songs chart and the Billboard Japan Hot 100. Remixes of "Lotus Flower" by various artists were released later in 2011 and compiled on the album TKOL RMX 1234567. A performance of "Lotus Flower" was included in the 2011 live video The King of Limbs: Live from the Basement.

== Music video ==
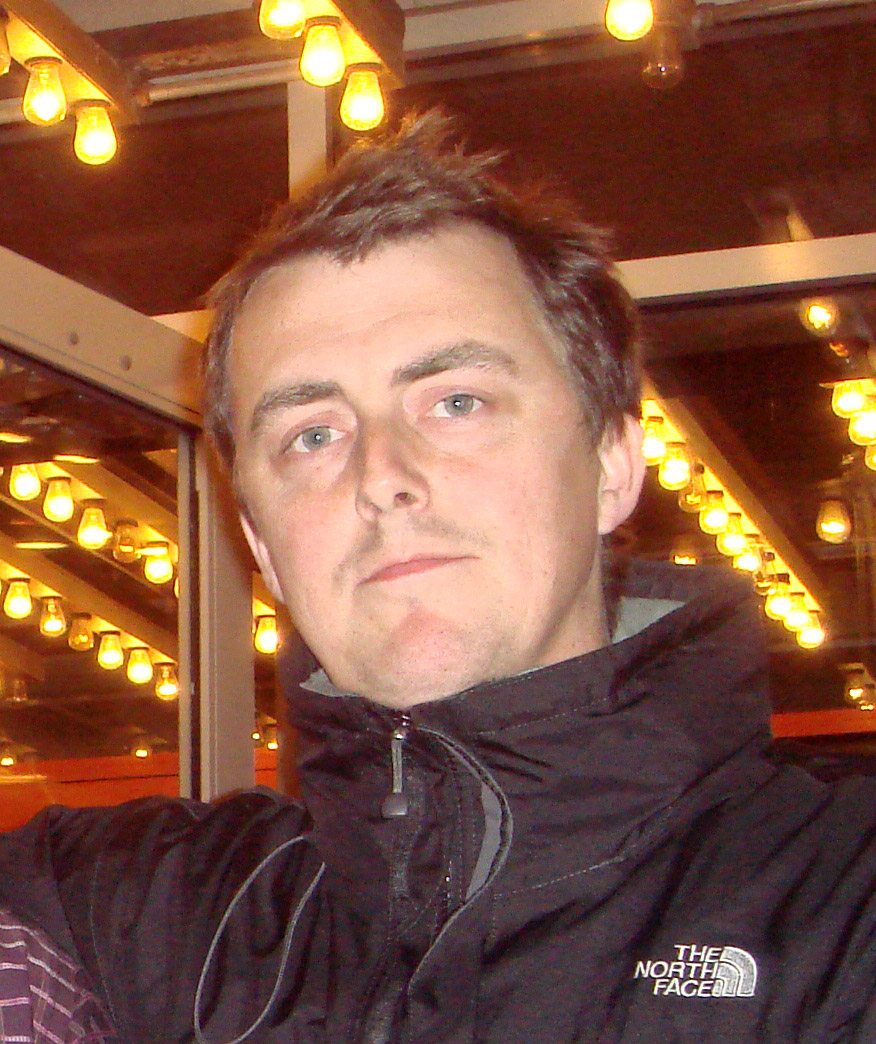
Garth Jennings directed the "Lotus Flower" music video.

Radiohead released a music video for "Lotus Flower" on their YouTube channel on February 18, 2011. It was directed by Garth Jennings and choreographed by Wayne McGregor, and features black-and-white footage of Yorke dancing erratically. Yorke said:

I'm never confident about how I look, but I'm always into being shocking and visually interesting ... I was deeply uncomfortable with the "Lotus Flower" video. I did the whole thing, it was such a crack, and then they showed me the rushes the next day and I was like, "This ain't going out." It was like paparazzi footage of me naked or something. It was fucked up. But if it's a risk that's probably a good thing.

The "Lotus Flower" video was one of the most watched music videos of 2011. By 2013, it had been viewed more than 20 million times. It was widely parodied, and the hashtag "#thomdance" trended on Twitter. It sparked the "Dancing Thom Yorke" internet meme, whereby people replaced the audio or edited the visuals. Yorke said about the response: "It's a massive kick. That's what everybody wants. If it's something you've worked at and it goes over the edge like that then that's great."

IndieWire wrote that Jennings had turned Yorke's "spastic" dancing into art, and that it was "bizarrely compelling ... with Yorke's flailing, curiously spellbinding limbs as the main attraction". In The New Republic, David Hajdu likened Yorke's moves to those of Joe Cocker, who "used his body and his voice in equal measure to communicate earthy wildness". He said the video recalled the 1966 dance piece Trio A by Yvonne Rainer, David Byrne's dancing in the 1984 concert film Stop Making Sense and Jerry Lewis' solo in the 1963 film The Nutty Professor. The video was nominated for Best Music Video at the 54th Annual Grammy Awards.

== Reception ==
Billboard and The New York Times praised "Lotus Flower" as the best track on The King of Limbs. The A.V. Club described it as "a sensually slinky come-on that's one remix away from being a dance-floor favourite". The Independent said it was "not exactly a singalong anthem" but "just blank and cryptic enough to sustain various interpretations". NME called it "subtle but powerful", and the Austin Chronicle called it "a commanding piece of modern electro-pop". The Guardian critic Alexis Petridis said "Lotus Flower" was "plaintive and sensual" and "a new addition to what you have to say is a fairly slender catalogue of Radiohead songs about having it off". The Telegraph critic Neil McCormick wrote that it was "a beauty ... The bass lopes elegantly over a gentle, loose limbed drum pattern. Yorke's singing is light and mellifluous." He likened it to Pink Floyd remixed by Burial. "Lotus Flower" was nominated for Best Rock Performance and Best Rock Song at the 54th Annual Grammy Awards.

== Chart performance ==
Chart (2011)	Peak position
Belgium (Ultratip Bubbling Under Flanders)	15
Belgium (Ultratip Bubbling Under Wallonia)	16
Japan (Japan Hot 100)	52
Mexico Ingles Airplay (Billboard)	25
UK singles chart (Official Charts Company)	165
US Adult Alternative Airplay (Billboard)	20
US Alternative Airplay (Billboard)	33
US Hot Rock & Alternative Songs (Billboard)	41
