= Burn the Witch (Radiohead song) =

2016 single by Radiohead

Single by Radiohead

from the album A Moon Shaped Pool
- B-side: "Spectre" (vinyl)
- Released: 3 May 2016
- Genre: Orchestral pop; art rock
- Length: 3:40
- Label: XL
- Songwriter: Radiohead
- Producers: Nigel Godrich; Radiohead

Radiohead singles chronology
"The Daily Mail" / "Staircase" (2011)	"Burn the Witch" (2016)	"Daydreaming" (2016)

Music video
- "Burn the Witch" on YouTube

"Burn the Witch" is a song by the English rock band Radiohead, released as the lead single from their ninth studio album, A Moon Shaped Pool (2016). It features a string section playing with guitar plectrums, producing a percussive sound. The lyrics warn against groupthink and authoritarianism. Radiohead first worked on the song during the sessions for their fourth album, Kid A (2000).

"Burn the Witch" was released as a download on 3 May 2016 on Radiohead's website, followed by 7-inch single released exclusively in independent record stores later that month. It was accompanied by a stop-motion music video that pays homage to the 1960s Trumptonshire Trilogy children's television programmes and the 1973 horror film The Wicker Man.

"Burn the Witch" was named one of the best songs of 2016 by Rolling Stone, Billboard and the Village Voice, and was nominated for Best Rock Song at the 59th Annual Grammy Awards. It was one of the year's bestselling vinyl singles in the UK.

== Background ==
Radiohead worked on "Burn the Witch" during the sessions for their albums Kid A (2000), Hail to the Thief (2003) and In Rainbows (2007). The title appears in artwork in the Hail to the Thief booklet. The singer, Thom Yorke, mentioned the song in a 2005 post on Radiohead's blog and posted lyrics in 2007. He briefly played chords from the song in performances in 2006 and 2008, but told the audience that Radiohead would perform it "when we get the orchestra".

Asked in 2013 about "Burn the Witch" and Radiohead's other unreleased songs, their producer, Nigel Godrich responded: "Everything will surface one day... it all exists... and so it will eventually get there, I'm sure." He cited the song "Nude", released in 2007 but written 12 years prior, as an example of a song that took several years to complete.

== Recording ==
According to the guitarist Jonny Greenwood, who arranges Radiohead's string sections, "Burn the Witch" was written with strings in mind. He said: "We left it unfinished on purpose and left lots of room for the strings and we never do that usually. Usually the strings are the icing on top."

The strings were recorded at RAK Studios in London. They were performed by the London Contemporary Orchestra and conducted by Hugh Brunt; Greenwood had worked with both on his score for the 2012 film The Master. Rather than bowing the strings, the orchestra players used guitar plectrums, creating a percussive effect.

Godrich's father died on the day of the string recording. According to Godrich, "I literally left him on a fucking table in my house and went and recorded. And it was a very, very emotional day for me. He was a string player as well so it was one of those things where it felt like he would want me to go and just do this."

== Music and lyrics ==
"Burn the Witch" was described by The Atlantic as an orchestral pop song and by The Guardian and Yardbarker as an art rock song. It combines strings and electronic percussion. According to Pitchfork, the string section "alternates between sumptuous flourishes and the darkest corners of The Shining's score". The Atlantic critic Spencer Kornhaber likened the strings to heavy metal, "chugga-chugga-chugga-ing the entire time". In the second half, the strings "gradually disintegrate"; while the cellos and basses adhere to a conventional chord progression, the higher strings become "deathly" and "horrid".

The lyrics direct the listener to "abandon all reason / avoid all eye contact / do not react / shoot the messengers / burn the witch". Yorke said the lyrics were inspired by the News of the World newspaper publishing the names and addresses of sex offenders in 2000.

== Video ==
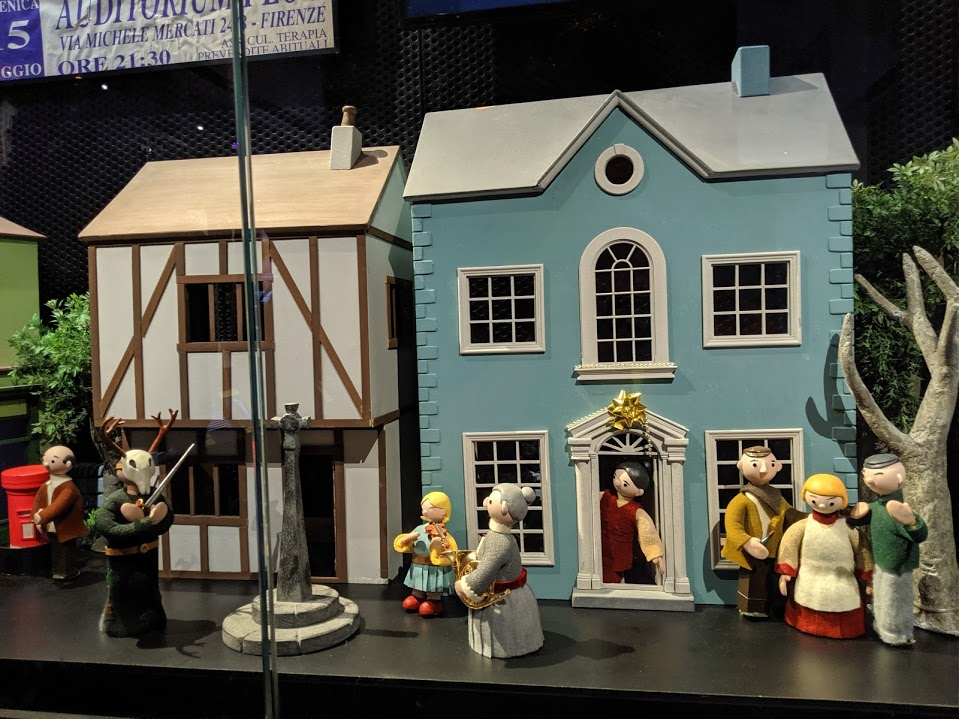
Props from the "Burn the Witch" music video on display in the Rock and Roll Hall of Fame in 2019

The "Burn the Witch" music video was directed by Chris Hopewell, who previously directed the animated video for Radiohead's 2003 single "There There". It uses stop-motion animation in the style of the Trumptonshire Trilogy, a series of 1960s English children's television programmes. According to the son-in-law of the Trumptonshire creator, Gordon Murray, the family was not asked permission to use the style and saw it as a "tarnishing of the brand". The video was conceived and finished in 14 days and released on YouTube a week later, on 3 May 2016.

The story homages the 1973 horror film The Wicker Man and depicts mob rule in a rural community. An inspector is greeted by a town mayor and shown a series of unsettling sights, culminating in the unveiling of a wicker man. The mayor urges the inspector to climb into it, whereupon he is locked inside as a human sacrifice and the wicker man is set on fire. As the flames gather, the townspeople turn their backs and wave goodbye to the camera. The inspector escapes among the trees.

== Interpretation ==
Pitchfork interpreted "Burn the Witch" as a criticism of authority and a warning against groupthink, expressing dread and skepticism. The Guardian felt it addressed mass surveillance or the threat to open discussion posed by the self-policing users of social media. The Pitchfork writer Marc Hogan suggested that the idyllic rural Britain depicted in the video addressed the rhetoric of "family values" used by right-wing politicians such as Donald Trump, Marine Le Pen and members of the UK Independence Party. After Trump was elected US president on 8 November 2016, Yorke tweeted lyrics from the song and linked to its music video, interpreted as a criticism of Trump's policies.

The animator Virpi Kettu, who worked on the music video, interpreted the song as a comment on the European migrant crisis and scapegoating of Muslims. The visual style was deliberately lighter in tone than the song, as Kettu said Radiohead "wanted the video to contrast with what they're playing and to wake people up a bit".

== Promotion and release ==
The card sent to fans, featuring embossed lyrics from "Burn the Witch" and Radiohead's "modified bear" logo.

In April 2016, one week before the release of Radiohead's ninth album, A Moon Shaped Pool, fans who had previously made orders from Radiohead received embossed cards with lyrics from the song: "Sing a song of sixpence that goes / burn the witch / we know where you live."

"Burn the Witch" was the lead single from Moon Shaped Pool. It was released as a download on 3 May 2016 on Radiohead's website and on streaming and digital media services. A 7-inch single, with the 2015 song "Spectre" as the B-side, was released exclusively in independent record stores on May 13 in the UK and soon after internationally. It became the year's 26th-bestselling vinyl single in the UK. The manga author Tite Kubo used the title for a spin-off Bleach manga.

== Reception ==
"Burn the Witch" received positive reviews. Pitchfork named "Burn the Witch" the week's "Best New Track", with the senior editor Jillian Mapes writing that it was Radiohead's most "unsettling and gorgeous" song since the 2000 Kid A track "How to Disappear Completely". Michael Hann of The Guardian called it "thrilling ... certainly the kind of return – bold and expansive, as well as dark and claustrophobic – that the world might have hoped for". Larry Bartleet of NME wrote that "a Radiohead melody has rarely sounded this joyful or indulgent, which puts the disturbing lyrics into especially sharp relief".

Daniel Ross, analysing the song for Classic FM, wrote that "while Radiohead are often held up as denizens of doing it differently ... 'Burn the Witch' is them working smart rather than working hard. They've set up simple confines, but within them they've experimented heavily and made something exceptionally strange, tonally speaking, and inventive to boot." The New Republic writer Ryan Kearney criticised the abundance of common phrases such as "shoot the messengers", writing that Yorke was "the most overrated lyricist in music today".

Rolling Stone named "Burn the Witch" one of the 30 best songs of the first half of 2016. Billboard named it the 19th-best pop song of 2016, and the annual Village Voice Pazz & Jop critics poll ranked it number 12. It was nominated for Best Rock Song at the 59th Annual Grammy Awards. In 2020, the Guardian named it the 35th-greatest Radiohead song, praising the power of Greenwood's orchestral arrangement.

== Track listing ==
=== 7" ===
- XL – 407917

Side A
No.	Title	Length
1.	"Burn the Witch"	3:40

Side B
No.	Title	Length
1.	"Spectre"	3:19

== Charts ==
=== Weekly charts ===
Chart (2016)	Peak position
Australia (ARIA)	63
Canada Rock (Billboard)	37
Belgium (Ultratip Bubbling Under Flanders)	16
Belgium (Ultratip Bubbling Under Wallonia)	18
Finland Download (Latauslista)	20
France (SNEP)	51
Ireland (IRMA)	51
Italy (FIMI)	92
Japan Hot 100 (Billboard)	62
Portugal (AFP)	56
Spain (Promusicae)	40
Switzerland (Schweizer Hitparade)	74
UK Singles (Official Charts)	64
US Bubbling Under Hot 100 (Billboard)	21
US Hot Rock & Alternative Songs (Billboard)	9
US Adult Alternative Airplay (Billboard)	23
US Alternative Airplay (Billboard)	29
US Rock & Alternative Airplay (Billboard)	44

=== Year-end charts ===
Chart (2016)	Position
US Hot Rock Songs (Billboard)	91

== Certifications ==
Certifications and sales for "Burn the Witch"
Region	Certification	Certified units/sales
Canada (Music Canada)	Gold	40,000^{‡}
^{‡} Sales+streaming figures based on certification alone.

== Release history ==
Region	Date	Label	Format	Catalogue no.
Worldwide	3 May 2016	XL	Download	XLDS791
United States	16 May 2016	XL	7"	407917
