= Daydreaming (Radiohead song) =

2016 Radiohead song

Single by Radiohead

from the album A Moon Shaped Pool
- Released: 6 May 2016
- Genre: Orchestral pop; chamber pop; art pop
- Length: 6:24
- Label: XL
- Songwriter: Radiohead
- Producers: Nigel Godrich; Radiohead

Radiohead singles chronology
| "Burn the Witch" (2016) | "Daydreaming" (2016) | "I Promise" (2017) |

Music video
- "Daydreaming" on YouTube

"Daydreaming" is a song by the English rock band Radiohead, produced by Nigel Godrich. It was released as a download on 6 May 2016 as the second single from Radiohead's ninth studio album, A Moon Shaped Pool. The song is a piano ballad with strings arranged by the Radiohead guitarist Jonny Greenwood. The music video was directed by Paul Thomas Anderson.

== Recording ==
"Daydreaming" was written around Jonny Greenwood playing piano in a jam without the singer, Thom Yorke, who added the vocals in another session. The song was finished early in Radiohead's sessions at the La Fabrique studio in France. Yorke described it as a "breakthrough" for the album.

For the introduction, the band slowed the tape, creating a pitch-warping effect. The strings, recorded at RAK Studios in London, were arranged by Greenwood and performed by the London Contemporary Orchestra, conducted by Hugh Brunt. The orchestra had previously worked with Greenwood on his score for the 2012 film The Master. Greenwood had the cellists detune their cellos, creating a "growling" sound. The cellist Oliver Coates said: "Nigel, Jonny and Thom all have this awesome relationship, and were so animated during the recording. I remember we were laying down the cello part at the end of 'Daydreaming' and Thom said, 'That's it – that is the sound of the record.'"

== Music and lyrics ==
"Daydreaming" is a ballad with a "simple, sad" piano motif and ambient, electronic and orchestral elements. It ends with reversed, manipulated vocals; when reversed, Yorke seems to be singing "Half of my life", "I've found my love", or "Every minute, half of my love". Several critics felt the lyrics were coloured by Yorke's separation from his partner of 23 years, Rachel Owen. Pitchfork noted that 23 years was also approximately the same length of time that Radiohead had been releasing music, and saw the song as a "reckoning with those years, and, in one way or another, an elegy to them".

== Music video ==
The "Daydreaming" music video was directed by Paul Thomas Anderson. Greenwood had previously created scores for several Anderson films. In the video, Yorke walks through a series of doors and passageways leading to locations including a hotel, a hospital, a laundry, and a convenience store. He eventually climbs a snowy hill, enters a cave, and mouths the closing words as he lies down next to a fire.

== Release ==
"Daydreaming" was released as a download on 6 May 2016 on Radiohead's site and on streaming and digital media services. It was the second single from Radiohead's ninth studio album, A Moon Shaped Pool. Anderson and Radiohead sent 35 mm prints of the music video to select theatres, inviting them to screen it. On 16 July 2016, Radiohead announced a fan competition to create a music video vignette for an alternative version of "Daydreaming" with additional strings.

== Reception ==
Pitchfork ranked "Daydreaming" the 24th-best song of 2016, behind another Moon Shaped Pool track, "True Love Waits", at ninth. In 2020, the Guardian named "Daydreaming" the 12th-greatest Radiohead song, writing: "Beneath the tiptoeing pianos, 'Daydreaming' is a gut-wrencher."

== Charts ==
| Chart (2016) | Peak position |
|---|---|
| Australia (ARIA) | 73 |
| France (SNEP) | 28 |
| Ireland (IRMA) | 84 |
| Italy (FIMI) | 88 |
| Portugal (AFP) | 77 |
| UK Singles (Official Charts) | 74 |
| US Hot Rock & Alternative Songs (Billboard) | 12 |
