= Last Post (poem) =

2009 poem by Carol Ann Duffy

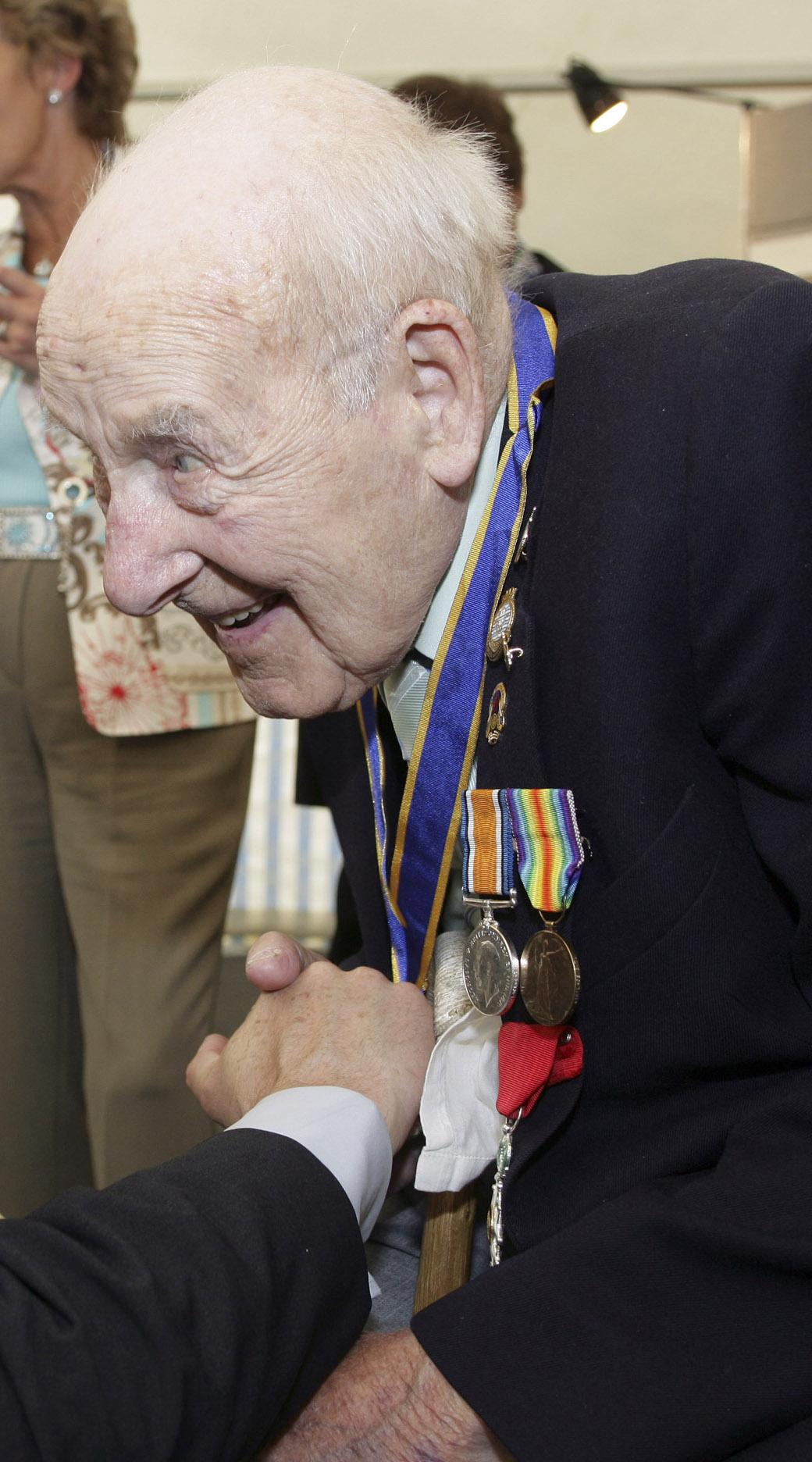
Henry Allingham in 2007

"Last Post" is a poem written by Carol Ann Duffy, the Poet Laureate of the United Kingdom, in 2009. It was commissioned by the BBC to mark the deaths of Henry Allingham and Harry Patch, two of the last three surviving British veterans from the First World War, and was first broadcast on the BBC Radio 4 programme Today on 30 July 2009, the date of Allingham's funeral.

The poem, named after the "Last Post" (the bugle call used at British ceremonies remembering those killed in war), makes explicit references to Wilfred Owen's poem from the First World War Dulce et Decorum Est. It imagines what would happen if time ran backwards and those killed in the war came back to life; their lives would still be full of possibilities and filled with "love, work, children, talent, English beer, good food." The poem was generally well received, with one commentator saying that it was "simply a damn good poem with rich imagery, cinematic movement and poignant ending." Another said that it was a "moving reversal of history" and a "fine poem". Duffy herself was quoted as saying that she wanted to honour the tradition of poets who were soldiers.

== Commission ==
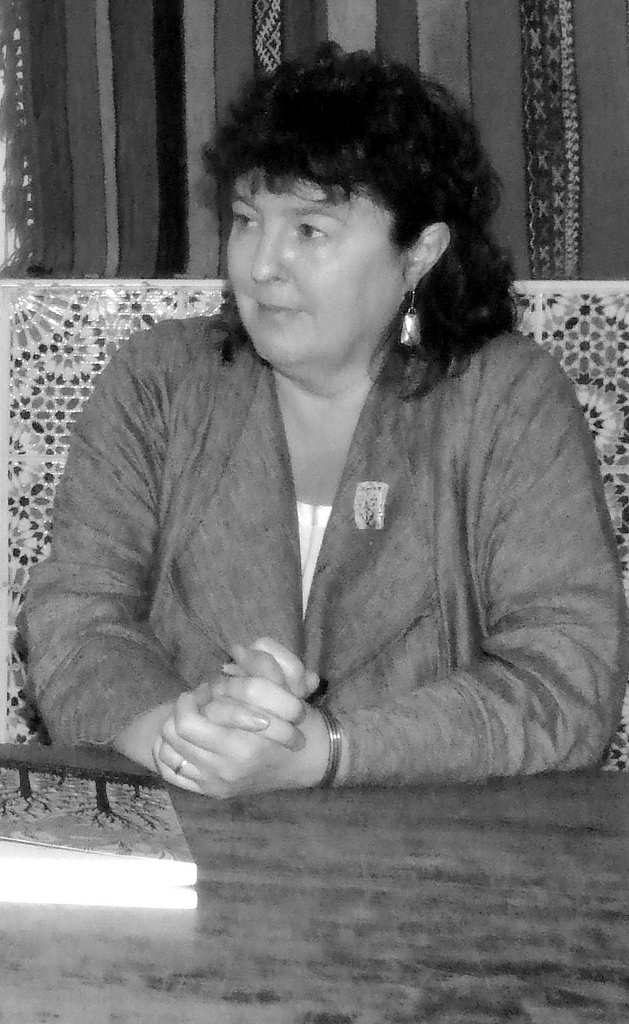
Carol Ann Duffy, the British Poet Laureate

Carol Ann Duffy was appointed as Poet Laureate in May 2009, the first woman to be appointed to the post. She was asked by the BBC Radio 4 programme Today to write a poem to mark the deaths of Henry Allingham and Harry Patch. The poem was read by Duffy on Today on 30 July 2009, the day of Allingham's funeral. Allingham, who served with the Royal Naval Air Service before becoming a founder member of the Royal Air Force, died on 18 July 2009 aged 113; Patch, the last surviving man to have fought in the trenches in the war, died on 25 July 2009 aged 111. Their deaths left Claude Choules, who served in the Royal Navy during the war and who lived in Australia until his death in 2011, as the last surviving British veteran.

Duffy said that she felt that she should "honour that great tradition of poets who were also soldiers", describing the poem as "an attempt at healing and being at one with the world", and "a tribute and blessing, even an apology, on behalf of poetry and all poets." She added that she "had been thinking about Afghanistan and trying to enthuse new war poetry among contemporary poets." The poem was broadcast one week after Duffy published a selection of poems she had commissioned from poets such as Sean O'Brien, Paul Muldoon and Daljit Nagra about the ongoing war in Afghanistan.

== Poem ==
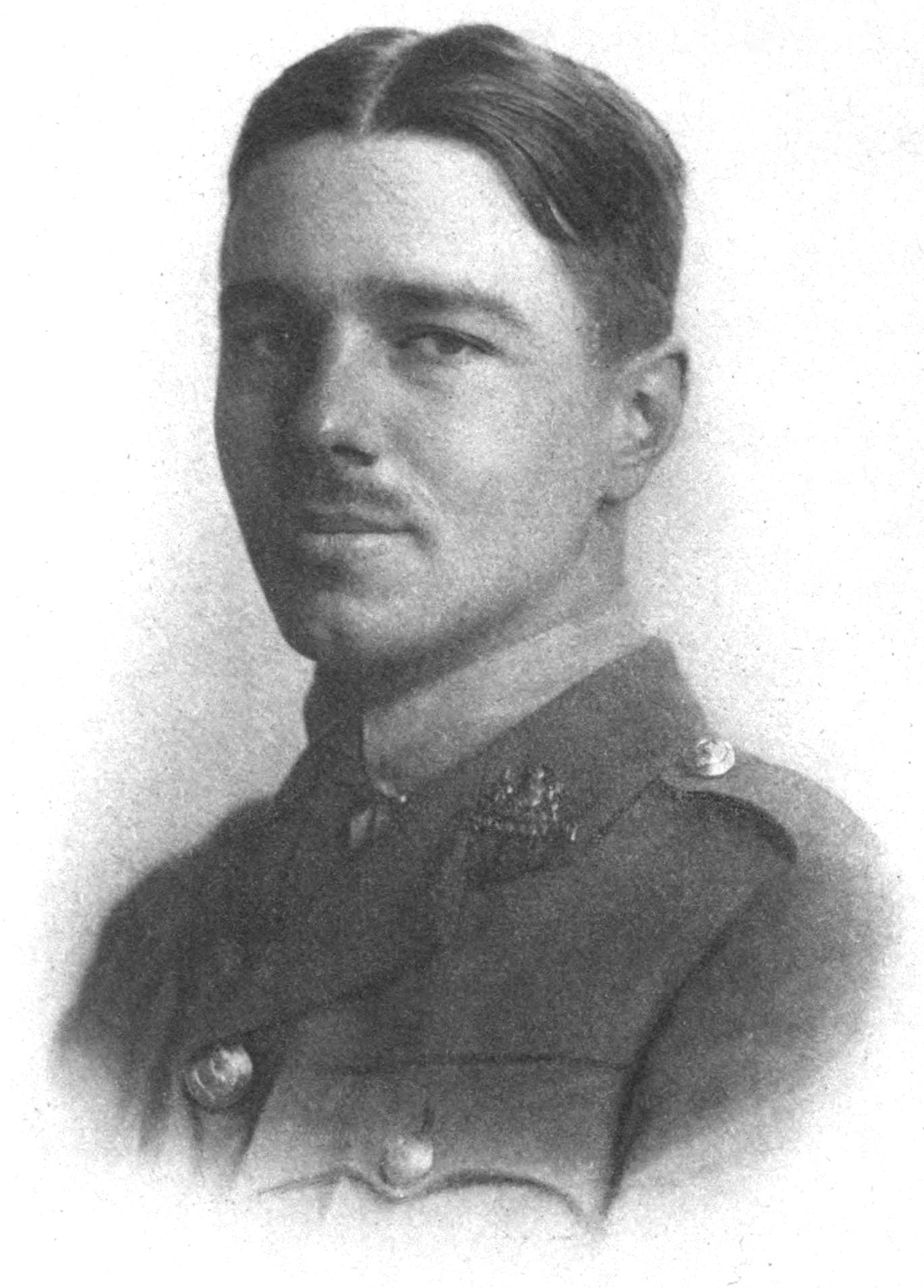
Wilfred Owen

The poem takes its title from the bugle call used at British ceremonies remembering those killed in war, the "Last Post". It begins with two lines from the poem Dulce et Decorum Est by the First World War poet and soldier Wilfred Owen:

In all my dreams, before my helpless sight
He plunges at me, guttering, choking, drowning.

The title of Owen's poem is part of a line from the Roman poet Horace – Dulce et decorum est pro patria mori ("It is sweet and fitting to die for one's country"). The phrase was inscribed over the chapel door at Sandhurst, the British military academy, in 1913. The phrase is again referenced when Duffy writes "Dulce — No — Decorum — No — Pro patria mori." The writer Will Heaven said that, whilst the poem denies that death in war is "sweet and proper" (dulce et decorum), it does not deny that the soldiers died for their country (pro patria mori).

The heart of the poem depicts events "if poetry could tell it backwards" – of soldiers who died in the war coming back to life, "lines and lines of British boys rewind / back to their trenches". The poem imagines "all those thousands dead / are shaking dried mud from their hair / and queuing up for home". Duffy pictures what would have happened to them if they had not died:

You lean against a wall,
your several million lives still possible
and crammed with love, work, children, talent, English beer, good food.

before adding, "You see the poet tuck away his pocket-book and smile". Erica Wagner, the literary editor of The Times, said that the poet Duffy refers to in the poem could be Owen, but could also be John McCrae, Isaac Rosenberg, or Charles Hamilton Sorley, or one of a number of other poets from the war. Wagner also noted that "Harry Patch and Henry Allingham escaped death, but never the effect of that awful war."

== Reaction ==
The poem received a generally favourable critical reaction. Wagner called it a "moving reversal of history", a "fine poem", and "the latest in a noble line of work [about the First World War] that aspires to a kind of salvation." Heaven said that it was a "poignant and beautiful tribute" to Allingham. It has been called "sombre yet supremely uplifting". The poem was also noticed in the United States. Jenna Krajeski, a writer for The New Yorker, described it as "another strong at-bat", and said that the poem highlighted "the power, but also the shortcomings, of poetry" when writing about an "imaginary, impossible event" and also writing about writing about it. The American poet John Lundberg said that the poem was a "surprising success", adding that not only was it "accessible" and "a fitting tribute to those who served in World War I," but also "simply a damn good poem with rich imagery, cinematic movement and poignant ending." However, Christopher Howse, a writer for the Daily Telegraph, took a different view of the poem's merits, saying (under the title "Carol Ann Duffy falls short of Henry Allingham") that Duffy's verse form was "open, to the point of invisibility".

== See also ==
- "Harry Patch (In Memory Of)", a tribute song by Radiohead
- 2009 in poetry
