= Radiohead for Haiti =

2010 video by Radiohead

Video by Radiohead
- Released: 24 December 2010
- Recorded: 24 January 2010
- Length: 124:48
- Label: Self-released

Radiohead for Haiti is a live video of Radiohead's concert in Hollywood on 24 January 2010. The concert raised money for Oxfam responding to the 2010 Haiti earthquake that month. Footage of the performance was recorded by audience members and edited by a fan; Radiohead allowed the video to be released online to raise money for Oxfam.

== Performance ==
On 24 January 2010, Radiohead performed in Hollywood, Los Angeles, to raise money for Oxfam responding to the 2010 Haiti earthquake that month. Radiohead were in Los Angeles recording their eighth album, The King of Limbs (2011), and performed without a light show and with reduced equipment.

Radiohead announced the concert two days beforehand. Tickets were auctioned online and sold for between $475 and US$2,000 each. The highest price paid was $4,000 for a pair of tickets. The concert raised $572,754. Further money was collected at the venue and from sales of limited-edition posters sold for $25 each.

The audience held 1,300 people, including numerous Hollywood celebrities. The venue capacity was one tenth of Radiohead's usual audience size. The set includes a version of "Everything In Its Right Place" performed on piano, and a solo performance by the singer, Thom Yorke, of the future King of Limbs track "Lotus Flower". Spin named the concert one of the best of 2010.

== Release ==
The footage was shot and edited by 14 audience members, and edited by one fan over nine months. With Radiohead's support, the video was made available for download and uploaded to YouTube on Christmas Eve, 2010. Oxfam set up a dedicated donations page for the project, and by 10 January 2011 had raised $11,500. The concert poster and cover video artwork were designed by Kii Arens. Radiohead added the video to their website in January 2020.

== Track listing ==
1. "Faust Arp"
2. "Fake Plastic Trees"
3. "Weird Fishes / Arpeggi"
4. "The National Anthem"
5. "Nude"
6. "Karma Police"
7. "Kid A"
8. "Morning Bell"
9. "How to Disappear Completely"
10. "A Wolf at the Door"
11. "The Bends"
12. "Reckoner"
13. "Lucky"
14. "Bodysnatchers"
15. "Dollars and Cents"
16. "Airbag"
17. "Exit Music (For a Film)"
18. "Everything in Its Right Place"
19. "You and Whose Army?"
20. "Pyramid Song"
21. "All I Need"
22. "Lotus Flower"
23. "Paranoid Android"
24. "Street Spirit (Fade Out)"
