= Supercollider / The Butcher =

2011 single by Radiohead

"Supercollider" / "The Butcher"

Single by Radiohead
- Released: 16 April 2011
- Recorded: 2009–11
- Genre: Electronic
- Length: 11:37
- Label: XL Records
- Producers: Radiohead; Nigel Godrich

Radiohead singles chronology
"These Are My Twisted Words" (2009)	"Supercollider" / "The Butcher" (2011)	"The Daily Mail" / "Staircase" (2011)

"Supercollider" and "The Butcher" are songs by the English rock band Radiohead, released as a double A-side in April 2011 for Record Store Day and June in North America. Radiohead worked on both songs during the sessions for their eighth album, The King of Limbs (2011).

== History ==
The Radiohead singer, Thom Yorke, first performed "Supercollider" solo on 6 June 2008 at Malahide Castle, Dublin. Radiohead worked on it during the recording of their eighth album, The King of Limbs, but did not finish it until March 2011, one month after the album's release. It features a "calm electronic pulse". Billboard described it as "eerie" and likened it to their 2000 song "Everything in Its Right Place".

"The Butcher" was completed during the King of Limbs sessions, but Radiohead decided it did not fit the album. It features "stuttering" drums and a one-note bassline. Billboard said it continued the "beat-focused, minimalist electronic feeling" of The King of Limbs.

== Release ==
"Supercollider" and "The Butcher" were released as a double A-side single on 12-inch vinyl on 16 April, 2011, for Record Store Day. On 18 April, Radiohead made them available to download for those who had ordered The King of Limbs from their website. A performance of "Supercollider" was included in the 2011 video The King of Limbs: Live from the Basement.

== Reception ==
Writing for Rolling Stone, Rob Sheffield described the songs as "superb electro ballads" that would have fit the "moodier second half" of The King of Limbs, and awarded the single four out of five. In the Guardian, Michael Cragg wrote that "Supercollider" had a " lovely rise and fall", and praised Yorke's falsetto. In Vulture, Marc Hogan wrote that "The Butcher" had "impressively rumbling percussion, but, by Radiohead standards, not too much more".

In 2021, the Stereogum writer Chris DeVille wrote that "Supercollider" was "the kind of epic that can work as an album's centrepiece and spine", and that "The Butcher" combined dance beats with "Radiohead's most dirge-like tendencies in fascinating ways". He speculated that The King of Limbs would be a fan favourite had it included them along with "The Daily Mail" and "Staircase", also released that year.

== Track listing ==
No.	Title	Length
1.	"Supercollider"	7:02
2.	"The Butcher"	4:35
Total length:		11:37

== Charts ==
Chart (2011)	Peak position
Finland (Suomen virallinen lista)	19
UK Indie (Official Charts)	26
