= The King of Limbs: Live from the Basement =

Video by Radiohead
- Released: 19 December 2011
- Recorded: 2011
- Venue: Maida Vale Studios
- Genre: Experimental rock
- Label: Ticker Tape
- Director: Vern Moen
- Producer: Music; Nigel Godrich; Film: James Chaos; Dilly Gent; Nigel Godrich; John Woollcombe

Radiohead chronology
| TKOL RMX 1234567 (2011) | The King of Limbs: Live from the Basement (2011) | A Moon Shaped Pool (2016) |

Singles from The King of Limbs: Live from the Basement
- 1. "The Daily Mail" / "Staircase" Released: 19 December 2011

The King of Limbs: Live from the Basement is a 2011 live video album by the English rock band Radiohead, comprising songs from their eighth album, The King of Limbs (2011). It was Radiohead's second performance for the series From the Basement, following In Rainbows – From the Basement (2008). Radiohead's producer, Nigel Godrich, described it as an effort to record a different version of The King of Limbs and show it in a "different light".

== Music ==
The video includes performances of all eight tracks from Radiohead's 2011 album The King of Limbs, plus the songs "The Daily Mail", "Staircase", and "Supercollider". It was recorded in Maida Vale Studios, London, and produced by Radiohead's longtime collaborator Nigel Godrich. Radiohead were joined by Clive Deamer on additional drums and percussion, and by a horn section for some songs.

Godrich said that whereas The King of Limbs was "very mechanised", the performance was "a very conscious attempt to do something special: to record the album again, once it had been rehearsed and played live, to show it in a different light".

== Release ==
The King of Limbs: Live from the Basement was broadcast on several TV channels internationally. The performances of "The Daily Mail" and "Staircase" were released as singles in 2011.

== Reception ==
Professional ratings
Review scores
| Source | Rating |
|---|---|
| AllMusic | 4/5 stars |

Reviewing The King of Limbs: Live From the Basement for AllMusic, Gregory Heaney wrote that "the session feels like the perfect environment for Radiohead to perform in, allowing them the freedom to relax and experiment with their sound without the pressure of a massive stadium audience to distract them from their music". In a 2015 article for Stereogum, Ryan Leas argued that it was superior to The King of Limbs: "You hear muscle and movement and bodies existing where the now tapped-out ingenuity of Radiohead’s electronic impulses has begun to make their recorded music brittle."

== Tracklist ==
1. "Bloom" – 6:13
2. "The Daily Mail" – 4:10
3. "Feral" – 3:35
4. "Little by Little" – 4:47
5. "Codex" – 5:09
6. "Separator" – 6:36
7. "Lotus Flower" – 5:43
8. "Staircase" – 5:06
9. "Morning Mr Magpie" – 5:46
10. "Give Up the Ghost" – 5:50
11. "Supercollider" – 5:41

== Personnel ==
Radiohead

- Thom Yorke – voice, keyboard, guitar
- Jonny Greenwood – guitar, keyboard, laptop, drums
- Colin Greenwood – bass
- Ed O'Brien – guitar, FX, voice
- Philip Selway – drums

With

- Clive Deamer – drums, electronic drums

Recording

- Nigel Godrich – production (music and film), mixing
- Vern Moen – direction, editing
- Darrell Thorp – sound engineering
- Drew Brown – recording assistance
- Daniel Landin – direction of photography
- James Chaos – production (film)
- Dilly Gent – production (film)
- John Woollcombe – production (film)

Brass

- Noel Langley
- Yazz Ahmed
- Clare Moss
- Trevor Mires
- Oren Marshall
- Ben Castle
- Phil Todd

Design

- Steve Keros – stills photography
- Wildwood & Twain – artwork and layout
