= The Daily Mail / Staircase =

2011 single by Radiohead

"The Daily Mail" / "Staircase"

Single by Radiohead

from the album The King of Limbs: Live from the Basement
- Released: 19 December 2011
- Recorded: 2011
- Genre: Alternative rock; electronica
- Length: 8:08
- Label: Self-released
- Producers: Radiohead; Nigel Godrich

Radiohead singles chronology
"Supercollider" / "The Butcher" (2011)	"The Daily Mail" / "Staircase" (2011)	"Burn the Witch" (2016)

Live videos
- "The Daily Mail" on YouTube
- "Staircase" on YouTube

"The Daily Mail" and "Staircase" are songs by the English rock band Radiohead, released as a download on 19 December 2011. Both recordings are taken from the live video The King of Limbs: Live from the Basement (2011), and feature the additional drummer and percussionist Clive Deamer.

== Recording ==
Both songs are taken from the live video The King of Limbs: Live from the Basement (2011), and feature the additional drummer and percussionist Clive Deamer.

"The Daily Mail" was written six years before release. When Radiohead decided to perform it for From the Basement, they completed the arrangement within a week, featuring a brass section arranged by the guitarist Jonny Greenwood. The song criticises the Daily Mail, a British tabloid newspaper, with lyrics such as "the lunatics have taken over the asylum" and "we'll feed you to the hounds / to the Daily Mail". Vulture described it as a "piano ballad that grows, bolstered by fury ... into a swaggering anthem".

"Staircase" features "atmospheric" synthesisers and "busy, skittering" beats. Radiohead worked on it before their eighth album, The King of Limbs (2011), but it did not progress beyond the demo stages until after the album's release.

== Reception ==
Reviewing a performance of "The Daily Mail" on The Colbert Report, the Guardian writer Hadley Freeman wrote that it was "a funny idea" but "barely touches its nigh-on unmissable target". In a 2020 Guardian article, Jazz Monroe named it the 39th-best Radiohead song, writing that while it would not fit The King of Limbs, "It's irresistible, suggesting an unlikely kinship between Radiohead and the venerable pop cynic Randy Newman: musical-theatre flair weaponised against tabloid hysteria."

In 2021, the Stereogum writer Chris DeVille said "The Daily Mail" was "among Yorke's most powerful piano rockers" and described "Staircase" as "like a Hot Chip song descending into purgatory (in the best way)". He speculated that The King of Limbs would be a fan favourite had it included the songs along with "Supercollider" and "The Butcher", also released that year.

== Track listing ==
No.	Title	Length
1.	"The Daily Mail"	3:37
2.	"Staircase"	4:31
Total length:		8:08

== Charts ==
Chart	Position
UK singles chart	71
US Alternative Digital Song Sales	16
US Rock Digital Song Sales	20
