= TKOL RMX 1234567 =

Remix album by Radiohead
- Released: 16 September 2011
- Genre: IDM
- Length: 105:51
- Label: XL
- Producer: Nigel Godrich (various remixers/additional producers)

Radiohead chronology
The King of Limbs (2011)	TKOL RMX 1234567 (2011)	The King of Limbs: Live from the Basement (2011)

Singles from TKOL RMX 1234567
- 1. "Little by Little" / "Lotus Flower" Released: 4 July 2011; 2. "Morning Mr Magpie" / "Bloom" Released: 15 July 2011; 3. "Feral" / "Morning Mr Magpie" / "Separator" Released: 29 July 2011; 4. "Give Up the Ghost" / "Codex" / "Little by Little" Released: 15 August 2011; 5. "Give Up the Ghost" / "TKOL" / "Bloom" Released: 29 August 2011; 6. "Good Evening Mrs Magpie" / "Bloom" Released: 12 September 2011; 7. "Bloom" / "Separator" / "Lotus Flower" Released: 10 October 2011

TKOL RMX 1234567 is a remix album of songs from the album The King of Limbs (2011) by the English rock band Radiohead. It was released on 16 September 2011 in Japan and on 10 October 2011 internationally by XL Recordings.

Contributing artists include Jamie xx, Nathan Fake, Four Tet, Caribou, Modeselektor, Mark Pritchard and SBTRKT. Radiohead said they wanted to allow the music to "mutate" by giving it to other artists to remix. Most of the remixes were also released as singles. TKOL RMX received mainly positive reviews.

== Background ==
On 6 June 2011, Radiohead announced a series of remixes from their eighth album, The King of Limbs, by various artists. The singer, Thom Yorke, said Radiohead wanted to experiment by giving the music to other artists to remix, and liked the idea that it was not "fixed and set in stone". He praised remix culture, and said: "I didn't just want floor-fillers and all that shit, I just wanted to see how the songs could really branch out and mutate." The drummer, Philip Selway, said he felt The King of Limbs was the Radiohead album that best lent itself to remixing.

== Release ==
The retail version of TKOL RMX was released on 16 September 2011 in Japan and 10 October in other countries. It reached number five on the US Billboard Dance/Electronic Albums chart. Radiohead promoted the release with a live event at London's Corsica Studios on 11 October, with DJs including Yorke, Jamie xx, Caribou, Lone and Illum Sphere. The event was streamed by Boiler Room.

Artwork for the singles compiled on TKOL RMX 1234567

The first seven remixes were released as 12-inch vinyl singles through XL Recordings. The eighth single was finished too late for inclusion on TKOL RMX and was released as a download. A remix of "Bloom" by Jamie xx, previously released on the TKOL RMX8 single, was released as a vinyl single on 23 January 2012.

Single	Tracks remixed	Remix	Peak chart positions			Release
Single	Tracks remixed	Remix	UK Sales	US Dance	US Sales	Release
TKOL RMX1	"Little by Little"	Caribou RMX	3	2	8	4 July 2011
TKOL RMX1	"Lotus Flower"	Jacques Greene RMX	3	2	8	4 July 2011
TKOL RMX2	"Morning Mr Magpie"	Nathan Fake RMX	4	3	15	15 July 2011
TKOL RMX2	"Bloom"	Harmonic 313 RMX	4	3	15	15 July 2011
TKOL RMX2	"Bloom"	Mark Pritchard RMX	4	3	15	15 July 2011
TKOL RMX3	"Feral"	Lone RMX	6	6	23	29 July 2011
TKOL RMX3	"Morning Mr Magpie"	Pearson Sound Scavenger RMX	6	6	23	29 July 2011
TKOL RMX3	"Separator"	Four Tet RMX	6	6	23	29 July 2011
TKOL RMX4	"Give Up the Ghost"	Thriller Houseghost RMX	7	4	14	15 August 2011
TKOL RMX4	"Codex"	Illum Sphere RMX	7	4	14	15 August 2011
TKOL RMX4	"Little by Little"	Shed RMX	7	4	14	15 August 2011
TKOL RMX5	"Give Up the Ghost"	Brokenchord RMX	9	—	—	26 August 2011
TKOL RMX5	"TKOL"	Altrice RMX	9	—	—	26 August 2011
TKOL RMX5	"Bloom"	Blawan RMX	9	—	—	26 August 2011
TKOL RMX6	"Good Evening Mrs Magpie"	Modeselektor RMX	7	5	15	12 September 2011
TKOL RMX6	"Bloom"	Objekt RMX	7	5	15	12 September 2011
TKOL RMX7	"Bloom"	Jamie xx Rework	6	7	16	10 October 2011
TKOL RMX7	"Separator"	Anstam RMX	6	7	16	10 October 2011
TKOL RMX7	"Lotus Flower"	SBTRKT RMX	6	7	16	10 October 2011
TKOL RMX8	"Bloom"	Jamie xx Rework Part 3	67	—	—	21 November 2011
TKOL RMX8	"Separator"	Anstam RMX II	67	—	—	21 November 2011
TKOL RMX8	"Morning Mr Magpie"	Nathan Fake Harshdub RMX	67	—	—	21 November 2011

== Reception ==
Professional ratings
Aggregate scores
Source	Rating
AnyDecentMusic?	6.5/10
Metacritic	67/100
Review scores
Source	Rating
AllMusic	3.5/5 stars
The A.V. Club	B+
The Guardian	2/5 stars
Pitchfork	6.0/10
Slant Magazine	3.5/5 stars

TKOL RMX has an aggregate score of 67 on Metacritic, indicating "generally favourable reviews". AllMusic said it was "fascinating to hear how this current crop of producers ... twists, bends, adjusts, and appropriates the source material". The A.V. Club felt "the best of these remixes excite and innovate in ways their [King of Limbs] counterparts didn't".

The Guardian wrote that TKOL RMX "feels less like an album than an info dump" and questioned "the utility in commissioning Four Tet and Caribou to rework songs that already sound a bit like Four Tet and Caribou". Pitchfork found it "listenable but ultimately bloodless".

== Track listing ==
Disc 1
No.	Title	Length
1.	"Little by Little" (Caribou remix)	5:40
2.	"Lotus Flower" (Jacques Greene remix)	7:10
3.	"Morning Mr Magpie" (Nathan Fake remix)	4:52
4.	"Bloom" (Harmonic 313 remix)	5:04
5.	"Bloom" (Mark Pritchard remix)	6:07
6.	"Feral" (Lone remix)	5:17
7.	"Morning Mr Magpie" (Pearson Sound "Scavenger" remix)	4:38
8.	"Separator" (Four Tet remix)	7:03
Total length:		45:51

Disc 2
No.	Title	Length
1.	"Give Up the Ghost" (Thriller "Houseghost" remix)	6:13
2.	"Codex" (Illum Sphere remix)	4:34
3.	"Little by Little" (Shed remix)	4:49
4.	"Give Up the Ghost" (Brokenchord remix)	5:05
5.	"TKOL" (Altrice remix)	6:02
6.	"Bloom" (Blawan remix)	7:29
7.	"Good Evening Mrs Magpie" (Modeselektor remix)	7:44
8.	"Bloom" (Objekt remix)	5:21
9.	"Bloom" (Jamie xx rework)	2:28
10.	"Separator" (Anstam remix)	4:50
11.	"Lotus Flower" (SBTRKT remix)	5:22
Total length:		Disc 2: 60:00; Total: 105:51

== Personnel ==
Credits adapted from liner notes.

Remix and additional production

- Anstam (disc 2: track 10)
- Dan Snaith (disc 1: track 1)
- Nathan Fake (disc 1: track 3)
- Four Tet (disc 1: track 8)
- Jacques Greene (disc 1: track 2)
- Ryan Hunn (disc 2: track 2)
- Ernestas Kausylas (disc 2: track 4)
- David Kennedy (disc 1: track 7)
- Lone (disc 2: track 6)
- Modeselektor ("on a yoga mat"; disc 2: track 7)
- René Pawlowitz (disc 2: track 11)
- Mark Pritchard (disc 1: tracks 4, 5)
- Jamie Roberts (disc 2: track 6)
- Mike Sadatmousavi (disc 2: track 5)
- SBTRKT (disc 2: track 11)
- Jamie Smith (disc 2: track 9)
- Darren J. Cunningham (disc 2: track 1)

Artwork

- Wildwood
- Twain

== Charts ==
Chart	Peak position
UK Albums Chart	34
Belgium Albums Top 50	43
Italy Albums Chart	63
French Albums Chart	79
Irish Albums Chart	48
Dutch Albums Chart	74
Swiss Music Charts	95
US Billboard 200	50
Billboard Alternative Albums	9
Billboard Dance/Electronic Albums	5
Billboard Independent Albums	8
Billboard Top Rock Albums	12
