= Ill Wind (Radiohead song) =

2016 song

Song by Radiohead

from the album A Moon Shaped Pool (special edition)
- Released: September 2016
- Genre: Bossa nova
- Length: 4:14
- Label: XL
- Songwriter: Radiohead
- Producer: Nigel Godrich

Licensed audio
- "Ill Wind" on YouTube

"Ill Wind" is a song by the English rock band Radiohead, released a bonus track on the deluxe edition of their 2016 album A Moon Shaped Pool. It was added to streaming services in January 2019, reaching number eight on the Billboard Alternative Digital Songs chart and number 24 on the Hot Rock Songs chart.

== Composition ==
"Ill Wind" features a bossa nova rhythm, falsetto from Thom Yorke, and lyrics advising the listener to stay detached and unemotional to avoid summoning an "ill wind". In the second half, layers of "icy" synthesisers enter. DIY described it as "gloomy but spacious recording", and likened the synthesisers to the Stranger Things soundtrack. Jon Pareles wrote: "More layers arrive, fluty sounds and buzzy ones, swallowing the song before prettily fading out. What seemed like a sanctuary was a trap."

== Reception ==
Critics likened the rhythm to Radiohead's 2001 single "Knives Out". The NME critic Larry Bartleet wrote that the synthesisers "are so effective precisely because they sound so alien", likening the outro to "freaky dismissal music from a church service in outer space". He said the "swirls" of synthesisers, samba rhythm and "doom-laden" lyrics were found on other Moon Shaped Pool tracks, and speculated that Radiohead had excluded "Ill Wind" as "those bases have been covered elsewhere". Caffrey wrote that "Ill Wind" would "stick out like a sore thumb had it been included".

== Charts ==
Chart (2019)	Peak position
France Charts (ACharts)	40
UK Singles Sales Charts (OCC)	50
US Digital Song Sales (Billboard)	9
