= The King of Limbs =

2011 studio album by Radiohead

Studio album by Radiohead
- Released: 18 February 2011
- Recorded: May 2009 – January 2011
- Studios: Home of Drew Barrymore (Los Angeles, California); Radiohead studio (Oxfordshire)
- Genres: Electronica; experimental rock
- Length: 37:34
- Labels: Self-released; TBD; XL
- Producer: Nigel Godrich

Radiohead chronology
In Rainbows – From the Basement (2008)	The King of Limbs (2011)	TKOL RMX 1234567 (2011)

The King of Limbs is the eighth studio album by the English rock band Radiohead. It was self-released on 18 February 2011 as a download, followed by a physical release on 28 March through XL Recordings internationally and TBD Records in North America.

Following In Rainbows (2007), Radiohead sought to explore less conventional song structures and recording methods. They developed The King of Limbs with their producer, Nigel Godrich, through sampling and looping their playing. The singer, Thom Yorke, described it as "an expression of wildness and mutation". The artwork, by Yorke and his longtime collaborator Stanley Donwood, depicts nature and spirits inspired by fairy tales.

Radiohead released no singles from The King of Limbs, but released a music video for "Lotus Flower" featuring Yorke's dancing, which inspired an internet meme. In 2012, they began an international tour, with several festival appearances. To perform the complex rhythms live, they enlisted a second drummer, Clive Deamer. The European tour was postponed after the temporary stage collapsed in Toronto's Downsview Park, killing a drum technician and injuring three other members of Radiohead's road crew.

Though its unconventional production and shorter length divided listeners, The King of Limbs was named one of the best albums of the year by publications including Rolling Stone, The Wire, NME and PopMatters. At the 54th Annual Grammy Awards, it was nominated in five categories, including Best Alternative Music Album. The download version sold more than 300,000 copies in two months, and the vinyl became a bestseller in the UK. The retail edition debuted at number seven on the UK Albums Chart and number six on the US Billboard 200. It was followed by the remix album TKOL RMX 1234567, the live video The King of Limbs: Live from the Basement and the non-album singles "Supercollider" and "The Butcher".

== Recording ==
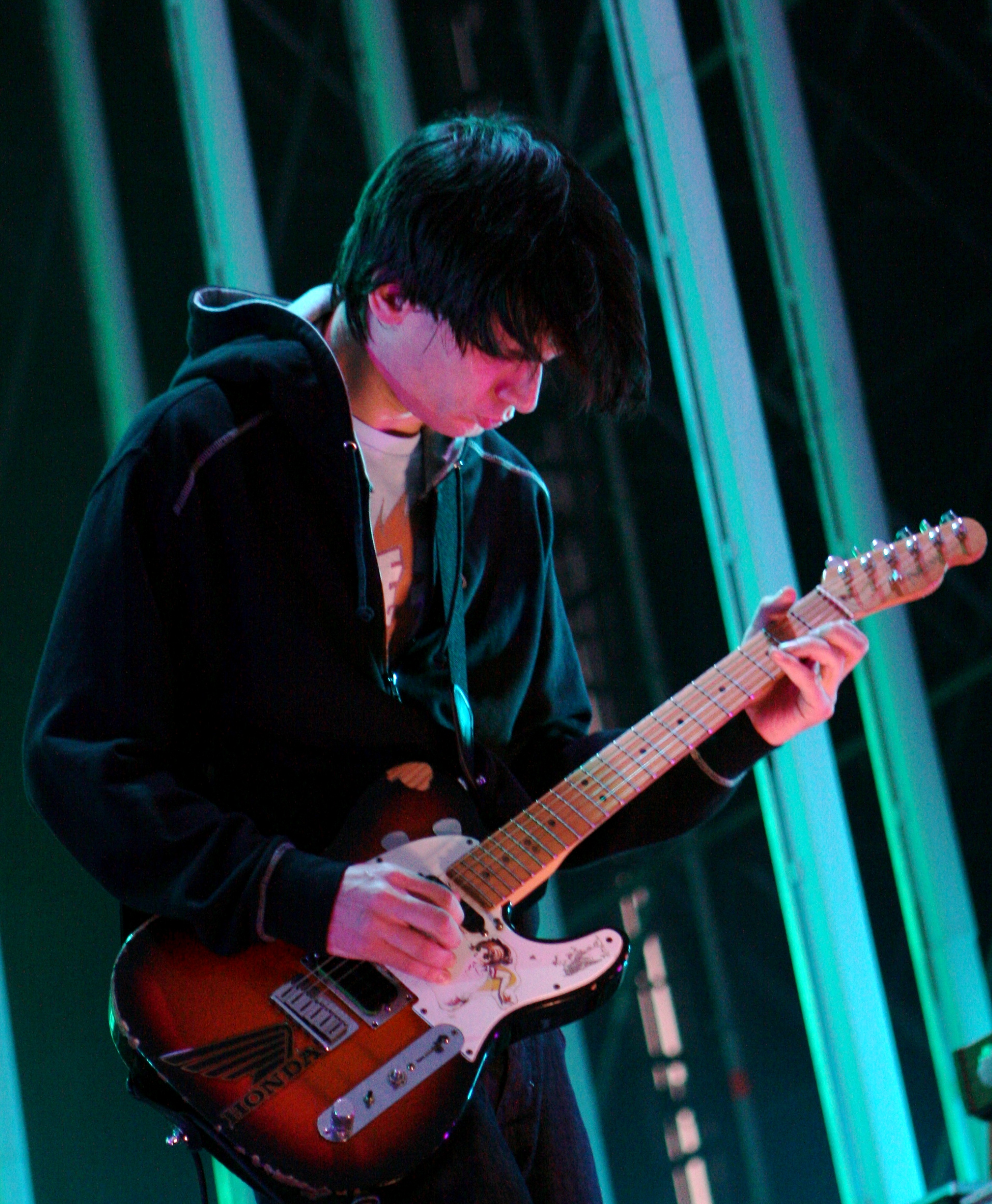
Jonny Greenwood wrote sampler software used to create The King of Limbs.

Radiohead worked on The King of Limbs intermittently from May 2009 to January 2011 with their longtime producer, Nigel Godrich. The sessions included three weeks at the home of the actress Drew Barrymore in Los Angeles in early 2010.

Radiohead wanted to avoid repeating the protracted recording process of their previous album, In Rainbows (2007). According to the singer, Thom Yorke, they felt they needed "a new set of reasons" to continue. The cover artist, Stanley Donwood, said that whereas In Rainbows was "very much a definitive statement", Radiohead wanted to make an album that was more "transitory ... to have something that was almost not existing".

Whereas Radiohead had developed In Rainbows from live performances, The King of Limbs developed from studio experimentation. Yorke sought to move further from conventional recording methods. The multi-instrumentalist Jonny Greenwood said: "We didn't want to pick up guitars and write chord sequences. We didn't want to sit in front of a computer either. We wanted a third thing, which involved playing and programming."

After Yorke and Godrich became interested in DJing during their time in Los Angeles, Godrich proposed a two-week experiment whereby the band used turntables and vinyl emulation software instead of conventional instruments. According to Godrich, "That two-week experiment ended up being fucking six months. And that's that record, the whole story of all of it."

Radiohead assembled much of the album by looping and editing samples of their playing using software written by Greenwood. Yorke wrote melodies and lyrics over the sequences, which he likened to the process of editing a film. The guitarist Ed O'Brien said: "The brick walls we tended to hit were when we knew something was great, like 'Bloom', but not finished ... Then [Colin Greenwood] had that bassline, and Thom started singing. Those things suddenly made it a hundred times better." According to Godrich, the result of the recording sessions was a "gigantic mess that took me about a year and a half to unravel".

On 24 January 2010, Radiohead suspended recording to perform at the Hollywood Henry Fonda Theatre to raise funds for Oxfam responding to the 2010 Haiti earthquake. The show was released free online that December as Radiohead for Haiti, and included a performance of the King of Limbs track "Lotus Flower" by Yorke on acoustic guitar. In February, at a benefit concert in aid of the Green Party, Yorke performed songs including "Separator" (then titled "Mouse Dog Bird") and "Give Up the Ghost". An acoustic performance by Yorke of "Morning Mr Magpie" was previously released on the 2004 DVD The Most Gigantic Lying Mouth of All Time.

== Music and lyrics ==
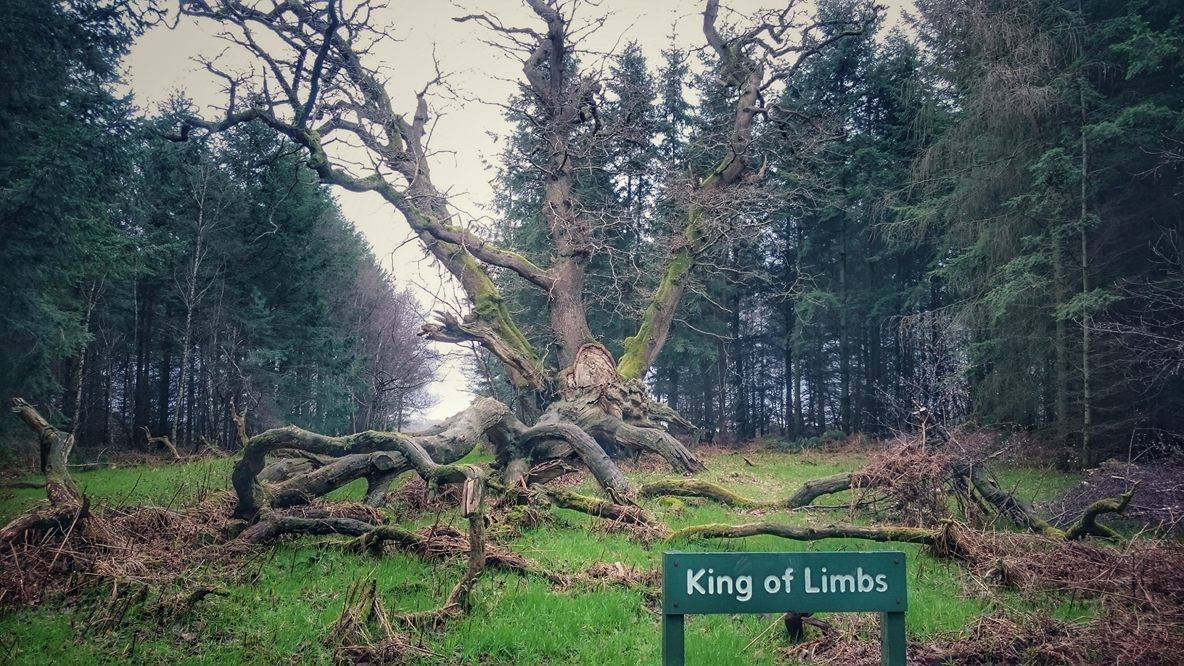
The album title derives from the King of Limbs, an ancient tree in Savernake Forest, Wiltshire.

Yorke said The King of Limbs was a "visual" album, with lyrics and artwork about "wildness" and "mutating" inspired by his environmental concerns. The title derives from the King of Limbs, an ancient oak tree in Savernake Forest in Wiltshire, near Tottenham House, where Radiohead recorded In Rainbows.

According to Rolling Stone, The King of Limbs saw Radiohead move further from conventional rock music and song structures in favour of "moody, rhythm-heavy electronica, glacially paced ballads and ambient psychedelia". It features extensive sampling, looping, and ambient sounds, including natural sounds such as birdsong and wind. Pitchfork said it comprised "aggressive rhythms made out of dainty bits of digital detritus, robotically repetitive yet humanly off-kilter, parched thickets of drumming graced with fleeting moments of melodic relief". O'Brien said "rhythm is the king of limbs", and that rhythm "dictates the record". The Rolling Stone writer David Fricke wrote that some tracks "hover and throb more like suggestions than songs, exotic murmurs in no hurry to become declarative statements". The critics Will Hermes and Neil McCormick noted dubstep influences.

The first track, "Bloom", was inspired by the BBC nature documentary series The Blue Planet. It features a piano loop, horns and complex rhythms. "Morning Mr Magpie" has "restless guitars". "Little by Little" features "crumbling guitar shapes" and "clattering" percussion. "Feral" features scattered vocal samples, "mulched-up" drums and almost "jazz-African percussive groove". "Lotus Flower" features a driving synth bassline and Yorke's falsetto. "Codex" is a piano ballad with "spectral" horns and strings and a Roland TR-808 drum machine. "Give Up the Ghost" is an acoustic guitar ballad with layered vocal harmonies. The final track, "Separator", has guitar, piano, a "brittle" drum loop and echoing vocals.

At eight tracks and 37 minutes in length, The King of Limbs is Radiohead's shortest album. O'Brien said that Radiohead felt the ideal album was around 40 minutes long, and cited What's Going On (1971) by Marvin Gaye as a classic record shorter than The King of Limbs.

== Artwork and packaging ==
The King of Limbs artwork was created by Yorke with Radiohead's longtime collaborator Stanley Donwood. As with previous Radiohead albums, Donwood worked as the band recorded nearby. He painted oil portraits of the Radiohead members in the style of Gerhard Richter, but abandoned them as "I'd never painted with oils before and I'm not Gerhard Richter so it was just a series of painted disasters". Instead, the music made Donwood think of "immense multicoloured cathedrals of trees, with music echoing from the branches whilst strange fauna lurked in the fog". He and Yorke drew trees with eyes, limbs, mouths, and familiars, creating "strange multi-limbed creatures" inspired by Northern European fairy tales.

For the special edition of The King of Limbs, Donwood wanted to create something "in a state of flux". He chose newspaper, which fades in sunlight, for its ephemeral nature. This reflected the album's nature themes, mirroring the natural decay of living things. Donwood took inspiration from weekend broadsheets and underground 1960s newspapers and magazines such as Oz and International Times, and took fonts from US newspapers printed during the Great Depression.

The special edition includes a sheet of artwork on blotting paper of the kind used to distribute LSD. Donwood said, "In theory, not that I would propose such an illegal thing, but somebody could ... And I don't think that's been done as a marketing thing before." The special edition was nominated for the Best Boxed or Special Limited Edition Package at the 54th Grammy Awards.

== Release and promotion ==
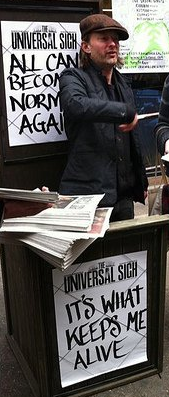
Thom Yorke distributing newspapers at a promotional event for The King of Limbs at Rough Trade, London

Radiohead formed a limited liability company, Ticker Tape Ltd, to release The King of Limbs. They announced it on their website on 14 February 2011. It was released on 18 February, a day early, as the website was ready ahead of schedule. The download version was sold for £6. A special edition, released on 9 May, was sold for £30. It contained the album on CD and two 10-inch vinyl records, additional artwork, a special record sleeve and oxo-degradable plastic packaging.

The NME reporter Matt Wilkinson argued that the surprise release was "a stroke of genius" that created excitement and "made being a fan seem like you're part of a brilliant, exclusive club". However, the NME deputy editor, Martin Robison, dismissed it as a promotional exercise: "the pose of anti-consumerism to win fans, then the total exploitation of that loyalty via consumerist means".

On the day of the release, Radiohead released a music video for "Lotus Flower" on YouTube, featuring black-and-white footage of Yorke dancing. It was directed by Garth Jennings and choreographed by Wayne McGregor. The video inspired the "Dancing Thom Yorke" internet meme, whereby fans replaced the audio or edited the visuals, and "#thomdance" became a trending hashtag on Twitter. A promotional broadcast in Shibuya Crossing, Tokyo, was cancelled due to security concerns.

The King of Limbs was released on CD and vinyl on March 28 by XL Recordings in the UK, TBD in the US and Hostess Entertainment in Japan. To promote the release, Radiohead distributed a free newspaper, the Universal Sigh, at independent record shops across the world. Donwood and Yorke distributed copies in person at the Rough Trade shop in East London. Influenced by free newspapers such as LA Weekly or London Lite, the Universal Sigh is a 12-page tabloid printed using web-offset lithography on newsprint paper. It features artwork, poetry and lyrics, plus short stories by Donwood, Jay Griffiths and Robert Macfarlane.

=== Sales ===
On the Radiohead website, where it was exclusively available for nearly two months prior to its retail release, The King of Limbs sold between 300,000 and 400,000 downloads. Radiohead's co-manager Chris Hufford estimated that Radiohead made more money from The King of Limbs than any of their previous albums, as most sales were made through their website without a record company.

The retail edition debuted at number seven on the UK Albums Chart, ending Radiohead's streak of five consecutive number-one UK albums, and sold 33,469 copies in its first week. The standard vinyl edition sold more than 20,000 copies in the UK in the first half of 2011, 12% of all vinyl sold in that period, and became the bestselling vinyl album of 2011. As of April 2015, it was the decade's second-bestselling vinyl in the UK.

In the US, the retail edition debuted at number six on the Billboard 200, with first-week sales of 69,000 copies. The following week, it reached number three, its highest position, selling 67,000 copies. It sold 156,000 copies in its first three weeks. By April 2012, The King of Limbs had sold 307,000 retail copies in the US, making it Radiohead's first album not to achieve gold certification there. This was credited to the surprise release; Radiohead's co-manager Bryce Edge said some fans did not realise Radiohead had released a new record.

=== Further releases ===
On 16 April 2011, Radiohead released more tracks from the King of Limbs sessions, "Supercollider" and "The Butcher", as a double A-side single for Record Store Day. The following week, Radiohead released both tracks as free downloads for those who had purchased The King of Limbs from their website. In June, Radiohead announced a series of King of Limbs remixes by various electronic artists, released as vinyl singles. Yorke said Radiohead had wanted to experiment with the music further by giving it to remixers, and liked the idea that it was not "fixed and set in stone". The remixes were compiled on the album TKOL RMX 1234567, released that September.

Radiohead performed The King of Limbs in its entirety for The King of Limbs: Live from the Basement, broadcast in July and released on DVD and Blu-ray in December. Godrich said the performance was an effort to record the "very mechanised" album again and show it in a new light. On 11 February 2014, Radiohead released an app, PolyFauna, a collaboration with the British digital arts studio Universal Everything, with music and imagery from The King of Limbs. Yorke said it came "from an interest in early computer-life experiments and the imagined creatures of our subconscious".

In 2017, Radiohead collaborated with the composer Hans Zimmer to record a version of "Bloom" for the BBC nature documentary series Blue Planet II. It features vocals by Yorke recorded alongside the BBC Concert Orchestra. Yorke said "Bloom" was inspired by the original Blue Planet series and so he was happy to "come full circle with the song".

=== Tour ===
Radiohead did not perform The King of Limbs live until several months after its release, as Yorke wanted to continue studio work and it took some time to arrange the album for performance. To perform the complex rhythms, they enlisted a second drummer, Clive Deamer, who had worked with Portishead and Get the Blessing. Selway said: "That was fascinating. One played in the traditional way, the other almost mimicked a drum machine. It was push-and-pull, like kids at play, really interesting." Deamer joined Radiohead for subsequent tours.

On 24 June 2011, Radiohead played a surprise performance on the Park stage at Glastonbury Festival, mostly performing songs from The Kings of Limbs and In Rainbows. The Guardian critic Rosie Swash gave the performance three out of five, saying the audience had hoped for older songs. In September, Radiohead played two dates at New York City's Roseland Ballroom and performed on the season premiere of Saturday Night Live and an hour-long special of The Colbert Report. In 2012, Radiohead toured Europe, North America and Asia, with appearances at the Bonnaroo, Coachella and Fuji Rock festivals. They played mainly arenas, as O'Brien said the "precise and detailed" King of Limbs material would not suit outdoor venues. Radiohead were supported in the UK by Caribou, in the US by Other Lives, and in Australia and New Zealand by Connan Mockasin.

On 16 June 2012, the stage collapsed during the setup for a show at Toronto's Downsview Park, killing the drum technician Scott Johnson and injuring three other members of Radiohead's road crew. After rescheduling the tour, Radiohead paid tribute to Johnson and their stage crew at their next concert, in Nîmes, France, in July. In 2013, Live Nation Canada Inc, two other organisations and an engineer were charged with 13 charges. Following a delay caused by mistrial, the case was dropped in 2017 under the Jordan ruling, which puts time limits on cases. A 2019 inquest returned a verdict of accidental death.

== Reception ==
Professional ratings
Aggregate scores
Source	Rating
AnyDecentMusic?	7.6/10
Metacritic	80/100
Review scores
Source	Rating
AllMusic	3.5/5 stars
The A.V. Club	B+
Entertainment Weekly	B
The Guardian	4/5 stars
The Independent	4/5 stars
NME	7/10
Pitchfork	7.9/10
Q	4/5 stars
Rolling Stone	4/5 stars
Spin	8/10

At Metacritic, which aggregates scores from mainstream critics, The King of Limbs has an average score of 80 based on 40 reviews, indicating "generally favourable reviews". Michael Brodeur of the Boston Globe praised "the tense calm these eight songs maintain — a composure that feels constantly ready to crack", and wrote that "where In Rainbows was mellow but brisk — an album that felt on its way somewhere — these songs are eerie and insidious, creeping like shadows". PopMatters' Corey Beasley wrote: "The King of Limbs is a beautiful record, one that begs more of a conscious listen than its predecessor, but one that provides equal — if different — thrills in doing so."

François Marchand of the Vancouver Sun said The King of Limbs "bridges Radiohead's many different styles" and was "worth embracing". The critic Robert Christgau awarded it a two-star "honourable mention" and recommended the songs "Little by Little" and "Bloom". The Quietus critic Ben Graham felt it could be Radiohead's best work, writing that it returned to the style of their albums Kid A and Amnesiac with "a greater maturity and weight of experience that enriches both the songs and the process". In Rolling Stone, Jon Dolan wrote that it was "Radiohead's funkiest record, and one of their most elusive". In The Daily Telegraph, Neil McCormick wrote that it was "Radiohead's most mellifluous collection ... If Radiohead are still a rock band, then no one has told them. This is something else entirely. The sound of the future calling."

Some felt The King of Limbs was less innovative than Radiohead's prior albums. Mark Pytlik of Pitchfork wrote that it was "well-worn terrain for Radiohead, and while it continues to yield rewarding results, the band's signature game-changing ambition is missed". The AllMusic editor Stephen Thomas Erlewine described it as "Radiohead doing what they do ... without flash or pretension, gently easing from the role of pioneers to craftsmen". Luke Lewis of NME felt it was "a record to respect for its craft, rather than worship for its greatness". The musician Brian Eno said The King of Limbs was "nearly brilliant ... They hadn't quite exploited all the drama in the mix. As a listener there was an opportunity missed. But it's such a good record."

The Los Angeles Times critic Ann Powers wrote that The King of Limbs had divided listeners, with some finding it too low-key, abstract or "doomy", or too similar to Radiohead's previous work. After waiting years for the follow-up to In Rainbows, some fans were disappointed by a shorter album that felt "relatively dashed together". Unfounded rumours spread of a second album soon to be released, bolstered by the lyrics of the final track, "Separator": "If you think this is over then you're wrong". Yorke said: "I can see why it's alienated people. I didn't realise it was its own planet."

The King of Limbs was named one of the best albums of 2011 by the Wire, the Guardian, Mojo, NME, PopMatters, Uncut and Rolling Stone. At the 54th Grammy Awards, it was nominated for Best Alternative Music Album and Best Boxed or Special Limited Edition Package. "Lotus Flower" was nominated for Best Short Form Music Video, Best Rock Performance and Best Rock Song.

=== Later reviews ===
In a 2015 article for Stereogum, Ryan Leas concluded that The King of Limbs was "very good, occasionally great music by a pivotal band that nevertheless felt like something of a letdown because it wasn't, ultimately, some genius stroke none of us expected". Many listeners preferred The King of Limbs: Live From the Basement, including Leas, who wrote: "You hear muscle and movement and bodies existing where the now tapped-out ingenuity of Radiohead's electronic impulses has begun to make their recorded music brittle." Writing for the New Republic in 2016, Ryan Kearney criticised Yorke's use of idioms, which he felt had worked on previous albums but less so on the "musically diffuse" and less "transportive" King of Limbs.

In 2021, the Consequence of Sound critic Jordan Blum and the Stereogum writer Chris DeVille wrote that The King of Limbs remained Radiohead's most divisive record. Some fans found it too short, or too "shallow and ephemeral". Blum and DeVille attributed the disappointment to expectations set by the "warm and approachable" In Rainbows, whose innovative pay-what-you-want release had boosted Radiohead's influence. DeVille also speculated that the running order, with the less accessible songs on the first half, had lost some listeners. In 2024, the Rolling Stone critic Andy Greene named The King of Limbs one of the 50 most disappointing albums, writing that it had followed perhaps the "best 12-year run" in rock history. However, he wrote that it was nonetheless "sensational" and "would be seen as a masterpiece if almost anyone else had released it".

== Track listing ==
All songs written by Radiohead.

The King of Limbs track listing
No.	Title	Length
1.	"Bloom"	5:15
2.	"Morning Mr Magpie"	4:41
3.	"Little by Little"	4:27
4.	"Feral"	3:13
5.	"Lotus Flower"	5:01
6.	"Codex"	4:47
7.	"Give Up the Ghost"	4:50
8.	"Separator"	5:20
Total length:		37:34

== Personnel ==
Radiohead

- Colin Greenwood
- Jonny Greenwood
- Ed O'Brien
- Philip Selway
- Thom Yorke

Additional musicians

- Noel Langley – flugelhorn on "Bloom" and "Codex"
- Yazz Ahmed – flugelhorn on "Bloom" and "Codex"
- The London Telefilmonic Orchestra – strings on "Codex"
  - Levine Andrade – leading
  - Robert Ziegler – conducting

Production

- Nigel Godrich – production, engineering, mixing
- Drew Brown – additional engineering
- Darrell Thorp – additional assistance
- Bryan Cook – additional assistance
- Bob Ludwig – mastering

Artwork

- Thom Yorke (credited as Zachariah Wildwood)
- Stanley Donwood (credited as Donald Twain)

== Charts ==
=== Weekly charts ===
Weekly chart performance for The King of Limbs
Chart (2011)	Peak position
Australian Albums (ARIA)	2
Austrian Albums (Ö3 Austria)	11
Belgian Albums (Ultratop Flanders)	7
Belgian Albums (Ultratop Wallonia)	8
Canadian Albums (Billboard)	5
Danish Albums (Hitlisten)	10
Dutch Albums (Album Top 100)	2
Finnish Albums (Suomen virallinen lista)	13
French Albums (SNEP)	8
German Albums (Offizielle Top 100)	13
Greek Albums (IFPI)	13
Irish Albums (IRMA)	7
Italian Albums (FIMI)	8
Japanese Albums (Oricon)	3
Mexican Albums (Top 100 Mexico)	8
New Zealand Albums (RMNZ)	5
Norwegian Albums (VG-lista)	4
Scottish Albums (Official Charts)	7
Spanish Albums (Promusicae)	10
Swedish Albums (Sverigetopplistan)	9
Swiss Albums (Schweizer Hitparade)	8
UK Albums (Official Charts)	7
US Billboard 200	3
US Top Alternative Albums (Billboard)	1
US Independent Albums (Billboard)	1
US Top Rock Albums (Billboard)	1

=== Year-end charts ===
Year-end chart performance for The King of Limbs
Chart (2011)	Rank
Belgian Alternative Albums (Ultratop Flanders)	44
Belgian Albums (Ultratop Wallonia)	94
French Albums (SNEP)	124
South Korean International Albums (Circle)	30
UK Albums (OCC)	118
US Billboard 200	135
US Alternative Albums (Billboard)	19
US Independent Albums (Billboard)	5
US Top Rock Albums (Billboard)	24

== Certifications and sales ==
Certifications and sales for The King of Limbs
Region	Certification	Certified units/sales
Canada (Music Canada)	Gold	40,000^{^}
South Korea	—	4,177
United Kingdom (BPI)	Gold	100,000^{^}
United States	—	370,000
^{^} Shipments figures based on certification alone.
