= List of chatbots =

A chatbot is a software application or web interface that is designed to mimic human conversation through text or voice interactions. Modern chatbots are typically online and use generative AI (GenAI) systems that are capable of maintaining a conversation with a user in natural language and simulating the way a human would behave as a conversational partner. Such chatbots often use large language models (LLMs) and natural language processing, but simpler chatbots have existed for decades.

== LLM chatbots ==
Chatbot	Developer	Released	Platform	Technology (Note: Entries in this column may or may not be accurate, as chatbots often employ multiple underlying models, which change over time.)	License (Note: Chatbots may be licensed differently from their underlying models. For the licenses of models used by chatbots, see List of large language models.)	Notes
Amazon Q	Amazon	2023-11-28	Web app	Amazon Titan, Amazon Bedrock, generative pre-trained transformers	?	Developed for enterprise use
ChatGPT	OpenAI	2022-11-30	Web app, iOS, Android	GPT-5.5, GPT-5.6, GPT-6, GPT-6.1	Proprietary	
Character.AI	Character Technologies	2022-09-16	Web app, iOS, Android	Proprietary models	Proprietary	
ChatGLM	Z.ai	2023-03	Web app	GLM family	Various	
Claude	Anthropic	2023–03	Web app, iOS, Android	Claude Mythos 5.1, Claude Fable 5.1, Claude Opus 5.5	Proprietary	
Copilot	Microsoft	2023-02-07	Web app, Windows, iOS, Android	Microsoft Prometheus, GPT-4	Proprietary	Launched as Bing Chat
DeepSeek	DeepSeek	2025-01-10	Web app, iOS, Android	DeepSeek R1, V3 and V4	Proprietary	Virtual assistant
Doubao	ByteDance	2023-08	Web app, iOS, Android	Doubao Pro, Doubao Lite	Proprietary	
Ernie Bot	Baidu	2023-03-16	?	?	?	
Gemini	Google	2023-03-21	Web app, Android, iOS	Gemini family of models	Proprietary	Virtual assistant
GigaChat	Sberbank	2023–04	Web app, iOS, Android	GigaChat	Proprietary	
Grok	xAI	2023-11-04	Web app, iOS, Android	Grok	Proprietary	Limited usage for all registered users on X.
HKChat	HKChat OmniServe Limited	2025-11-20	Web app, iOS, Android	HKGAI V1 LLM	Proprietary	
Inflection AI	Inflection AI, Inc.	?	Web app, iOS, Android	?	?	
Kimi	Moonshot AI	2023-11-16	Web app, iOS, Android	Kimi family of models	Proprietary	
Leo	Brave Software	2023-11-02	Web app, Windows, macOS, Linux, iOS, Android	LLaMA 4, Claude and others	Proprietary	Included with the Brave browser
Meta AI	Meta AI	2023-09-27	Web app, Windows, macOS, iOS, Android	Muse Spark	?	Included with the Meta's apps
Mistral Vibe	Mistral AI	2024-02-26	Web app, iOS, Android	Mistral, Magistral, Codestral and Devstral	Proprietary	GDPR-compliant
Perplexity	Aravind Srinivas	2022-12-07	Web app, Windows, macOS, iOS, Android	Sonar	Proprietary	
Qwen	Alibaba Group	2023-09-01	Web app, Android	Qwen1.5, Qwen2, Qwen3	?	
Llama (Meta)	Meta AI	2023-02-24	Web app	Llama 4 Maverick, Llama 4 Scout	Source-available (Llama 4 Community License Agreement and Llama 4 Acceptable Use Policy)	
YouChat	You.com	2021-11-09	Web app	YouChat		
Lumo	Proton AG	2025-7-23	Web app, iOS, Android	Mistral NeMo, Mistral Small 3 and others	Web and mobile clients:GPLv3 Server: Proprietary	Lumo is a personal assistant

== General chatbots ==
Chatbot	Developer	Released	Platform	Technology	License (Note: Chatbots may be licensed differently from their underlying models. For the licenses of models used by chatbots, see List of large language models.)	Notes
Amazon Alexa	Amazon	2014-11-06	Fire OS, iOS, Android, Linux, Windows, Wear OS	Largely based on a Polish speech synthesizer named Ivona, bought by Amazon in 2013	Proprietary	Virtual assistant
Alice	Yandex	2017-10-10	Web app, Windows, iOS, Android	YandexGPT	Proprietary	Virtual assistant
AliGenie	Alibaba Group	2017-07-05	?	?	?	Virtual assistant
Bixby	Samsung Electronics	2017-04-21	Android, Tizen, Windows, Wear OS	?	Proprietary	Virtual assistant
Braina	Brainasoft	2014-02-09 or earlier	Windows	Various	Proprietary	Virtual assistant and speech-to-text dictation application
Celia	Huawei	2020-04-27	Android, EMUI, HarmonyOS	Huawei PanGu	Proprietary	Virtual assistant designed for the latest HarmonyOS and Android-based EMUI smartphones that lack Google Services and the Google Assistant
Chai	Chai	2021-09-01	API, iOS, Android	Chatbot platform	Proprietary	
ChatBot	Text	2019-08	API, Web app	?	Proprietary	Launched as BotEngine
Cleverbot	Rollo Carpenter	2008–10	Web app	?	?	Winner of the 2010 Mechanical Intelligence Competition
Clova	Naver Corporation	2017-03-01	iOS, Android	?	?	Virtual assistant
Google Assistant	Google	2016-05-18	Android, ChromeOS, iOS, iPadOS, KaiOS, Linux, Android TV, Wear OS	?	Proprietary	Virtual assistant
Jabberwacky	Rollo Carpenter	1997	Web app	?	?	Predecessor to Cleverbot
Kuki	Steve Worswick	2005	Web app, various social networks	Pandorabots AIML	?	Embodied five-time Loebner Prize winner designed to befriend humans in the metaverse
Lenny	"Mango"	2011	?	?	Source-available	An audio bot designed to annoy telemarketers
MegaHAL	Jason Hutchens	1995-04-30	Web app, command line	Markov chain (4th order)	Unlicense	
SILVIA	Cognitive Code	2008-01-01	Windows, macOS, iOS, Android	?	Proprietary	Core platform technology
SimSimi	ISMaker	2002	Web app, iOS, Android	?	?	
Siri	Apple Inc.	2011-10-05	iOS, iPadOS, watchOS, macOS, tvOS, audioOS, visionOS	?	Proprietary	Virtual assistant
Ultra Hal	Robert Medeksza	2000-12-04 or earlier	Windows		?	2007 Loebner Prize winner intended to function as a virtual assistant
Xiaowei	Tencent	2017-06 (late in the month)	?	?	?	Virtual assistant

== Historical chatbots ==
Chatbot	Developer	Released	Discontinued	Platform	Technology	License	Notes
Albert One	Robby Garner	1995	June 2005	The Internet	Based on a multi-faceted approach in natural-language programming	?	1998 and 1999 Loebner Prize winner designed to mimic the way humans make conversations
Artificial Linguistic Internet Computer Entity	Richard Wallace	1995-11-23	2013-10-15	?	AIML	Open-source software	Three-time Loebner Prize winner
Assistant	Speaktoit	2011-03-01	2016-12-15	Android, iOS, Windows Phone, Windows 8, Windows 10, ChromeOS	?	?	A virtual assistant acquired by Google, unrelated to the Google Assistant
Charlix	?	2006-04-17	2010-03-03	Linux	Based on Artificial Linguistic Internet Computer Entity	Open-source software	Desktop virtual assistant
Cortana	Microsoft	2014-04-02	2023-08-11	Windows, Windows Phone, iOS, Android, Xbox OS	Tellme Networks, Satori, Microsoft Eva	Proprietary	A deprecated virtual assistant succeeded by Copilot; originally named after character in Xbox Halo video game
Dr. Sbaitso	Creative Labs	1991-06 or earlier	?	MS-DOS	Speech synthesis	?	Initially released in Singapore
ELIZA	Joseph Weizenbaum	1964	1967 (stopped development)	?	Pattern matching, MAD-SLIP, lisp-like representation	?	Developed at MIT
Eugene Goostman	Vladimir Veselov, Eugene Demchenko, Sergey Ulasen	2001	2014-06-07	?	?	?	2012 Turing 100 and 2014 Royal Society Turing test winner some regard as having passed the Turing test
Evi	True Knowledge	2012–10	2014-01-23	iOS, Android	?	?	Virtual assistant
Fred	Robby Garner	1997-12-01 or earlier	?	?	?	?	
GooglyMinotaur	ActiveBuddy (under contract by Capitol Records)	2001–06	2002-03-24	AIM	?	?	ActiveBuddy's first offering, specializing in Radiohead-related information
Infobot	Kevin Lenzo	1995–06	?	IRC	Perl, factoids	Artistic License	An IRC bot primarily designed to assist with answering FAQs in channels such as #perl
Jeeney AI	C.J. Jones	2007-02	2010	?	?	?	2009 Chatterbox Challenge winner
Mark V Shaney	Rob Pike, Bruce Ellis, Don P. Mitchell	1981	?	Usenet	Markov chain techniques	?	A synthetic user whose postings in the net.singles newsgroups were generated based on text from other postings
Mycroft	Mycroft team	2015-11-17	2023-01-31	Linux	?	Apache License	Virtual assistant
PARRY	Kenneth Colby	1972	?	?	?	?	An early example of a chatbot
Racter	Mindscape (publisher)	1984	?	IBM PC compatibles, Apple II, Mac, Amiga	?	?	Was able to generate English-language prose at random
SmarterChild	ActiveBuddy	2001–06	2006-10-12	AIM, Windows Live Messenger	?	?	The second bot released by ActiveBuddy
Sparrow	Google DeepMind	2022–09	2023-01-12	Web app	Chinchilla	Proprietary	
Tay	Microsoft	2016-03-23	2016-03-24	Twitter	?	?	Rapidly decayed into producing racist bigotry after manipulation by online trolls (from 4chan and 8chan); suspended after 16 hours
Verbot	Avaya	1997	2012 (early in the year)	Microsoft Windows, web app	?	?	An artificial intelligence software development kit
Viv	Viv Labs, Inc. (subsidiary of Samsung Electronics)	2016-05-09	2017-10-18	iOS, Android	Integrated into Bixby 2.0	?	Virtual assistant
Zo	Microsoft	2016-12	2019-09-07	Facebook, GroupMe, Kik, Twitter	?	?	

== See also ==
- Cursor (code editor) — Fork of VS Code with additional AI features
- J.A.R.V.I.S. — AI from Iron Man
- List of AI-assisted software development tools
- List of large language models
- List of artificial intelligence companies
- OpenClaw — Agentic AI native desktop application that performs actions on a user's computer
- OpenRouter
- The Pile (dataset), public data used to train many research models
