= Casilli =

Casilli is an Italian surname. Notable people with the surname include:

- Antonio Casilli (born 1972), French sociologist
- Mario Casilli (1931–2002), American photographer

== See also ==
- Casillo, surname
