= Dean Weber =

American computer scientist

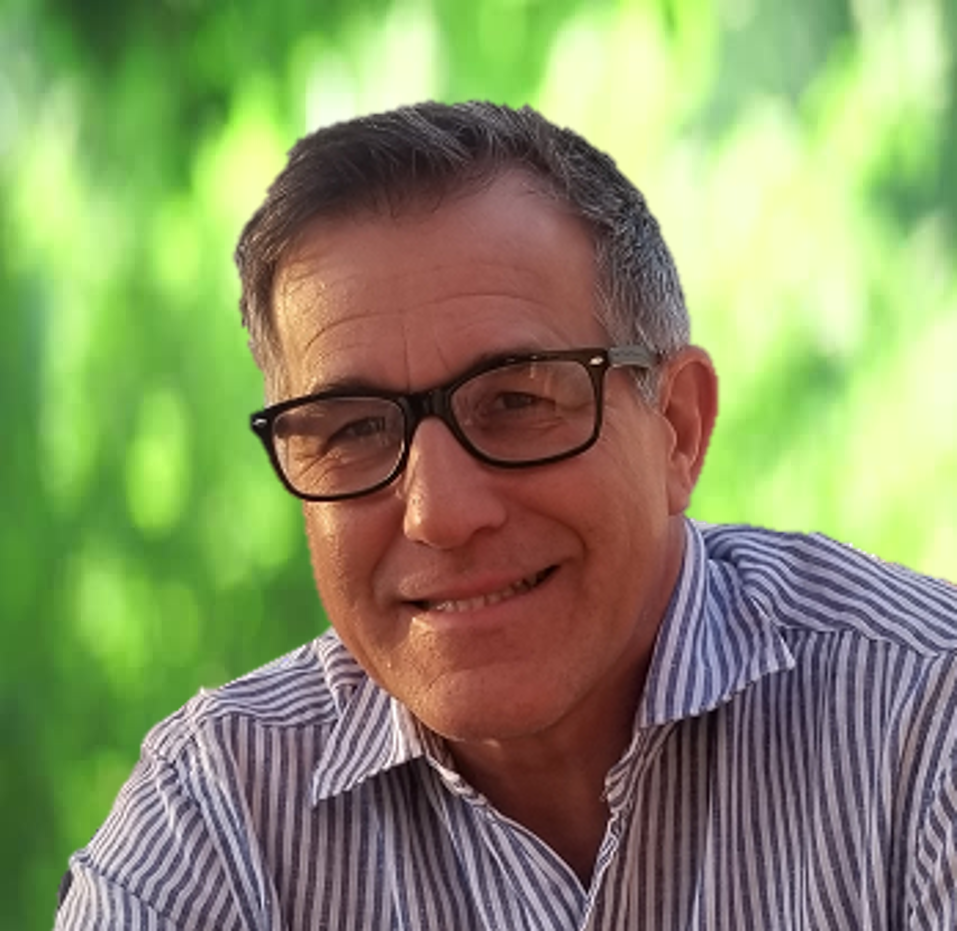
- Dean Weber in 2021
- Born: August 12, 1962 (age 63); Buffalo, New York
- Occupations: computer scientist, entrepreneur, inventor
- Known for: Artificial Intelligence, Intelligent personal assistant, Machine Learning

Dean Weber (born August 12, 1962) is an American entrepreneur, computer scientist and inventor, described by many as "the father of the intelligent personal assistant" and was credited for the commercial launch of the first virtual assistant called IVAN, in 1999. During that time, Weber was founder of One Voice Technologies, an Artificial Intelligence company founded in 1998 in San Diego, California. At One Voice, Weber was instrumental in launching voice solutions worldwide to millions of users and ultimately sold his patent portfolio to Apple in 2010 prior to Apple's launch of Siri.

In 2017 and 2018, Weber showcased advanced conversational-AI solutions for connected cars with Mitsubishi and Faurecia at auto shows in Detroit, Paris, Shanghai, and Consumer Electronics Show (CES) in Las Vegas.

Today, Weber leads a team of entrepreneurs and AI scientists creating conversational-AI voice solutions in the digital health sector at Quantum AI Health. Quantum AI Health is focused on providing Artificial Intelligence solutions to improve patient care and physician access to electronic health records with their AI-based Virtual Medical Scribe platform.

== Education and early career ==
Weber attended Central Connecticut State University (CCSU) and graduated in 1984 with a degree in computer science and minor in mathematics. At CCSU, he studied compiler design, queueing theory, and wrote several applications for disk operating systems and virtual memory optimizations.

Upon graduation, Weber was hired by United Technologies Hamilton Standard Advanced Space and Sea Division in Windsor Locks Connecticut, where we worked on a team that designed and developed the NASA Extravehicular Mobility Unit (EMU) space suit for the International Space Station (ISS) and NASA's Space Shuttle program. In addition, at Hamilton Standard Weber worked on Navy submarine projects where he held a DoD Top Secret clearance.

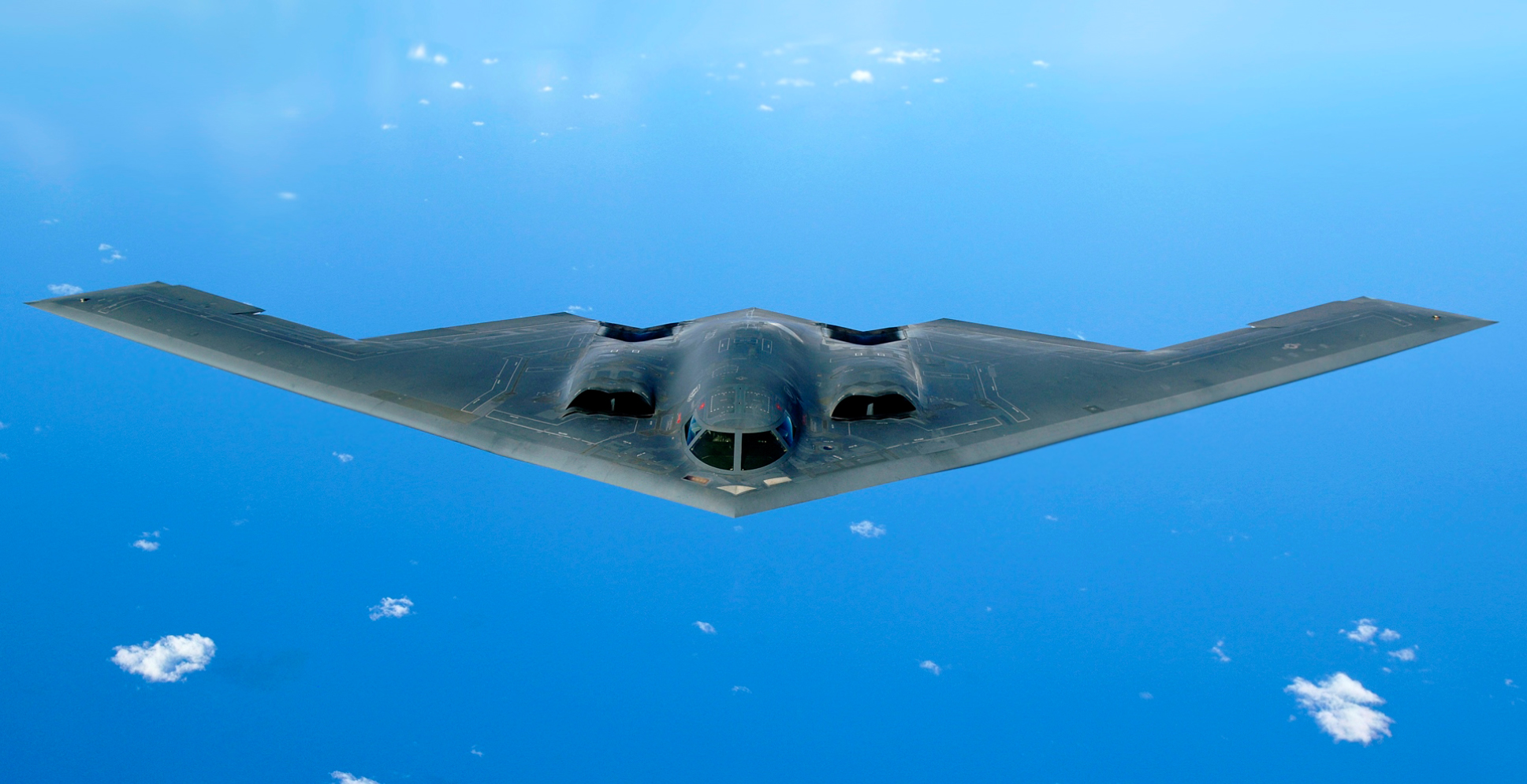
B-2 Spirit Stealth Bomber

In 1986, at the age of 23, Weber was hired by Northrop Grumman in Los Angeles, California, where he developed software for the Northrop B-2 Spirit Stealth Bomber, with a DoD Top Secret clearance, and was on the original public launch team in 1998.

== Career ==
=== EditPro ===
In 1990, at the age of 27, Weber founded EditPro, a software development company that developed and sold the industries first fully integrated development environment (IDE) with embedded syntax color coding and support for Ada, Assembler, Basic, C/C++, Clipper, COBOL, dBase/xBase, Fortran, FoxPro, HTML, Java, Makefiles, Paradox, Pascal, RTF, SGML, SQL, Windows API functions, and Windows .INI files. In 1992, Weber sold the company to Kubota of Japan to launch advanced software development tools in the Japanese market.

=== Conversational systems ===
In 1992, at the age of 29, Weber began developing several technologies combining state-of-the-art voice recognition, dictation, and facial recognition solutions to create the industries first AI-based virtual personal assistant.

=== One Voice Technologies ===
In 1996, Weber began Conversit.com and later changed the name to One Voice Technologies. The company was an early pioneer in conversational-AI and is credited with launching the industries first virtual personal assistant in 1999. As founder, Weber built the company from startup to Nasdaq listing and raised over $50M in funding. From 1999 to 2010, the company launched several industry first solutions in the consumer, automotive, telecom, and gaming industries. In 2010, the company sold its patent portfolio to Apple for technology used in Siri.

==== Timeline of products and news from One Voice Technologies ====
Name	Year	Description	Links
IVAN	1999	Intelligent Voice Animated Navigator	https://www.youtube.com/watch?v=IVcJcghRGxc
Forbes Magazine	1999	Speak for Yourself	https://www.forbes.com/forbes/1999/1115/6412244a.html?sh=4f3e1ce95594
Harry Potter DVD	2002	One Voice Technologies and Warner Home Video Unveil the World's First Voice Interactive DVD With Harry Potter and the Sorcerer's Stone	
Media Center Communicator	2007	Voice Control Your Home	https://www.youtube.com/watch?v=MM8tLUdTw_Ihttps://www.youtube.com/watch?v=rNGqJwjKFtg
Samsung Q1 UMPC	2007	Voice Control for Samsung's Q1 Ultra Mobile PC	https://www.youtube.com/watch?v=38225dFAgn8
Say2Play	2008	Voice Control Gaming Experience	https://www.youtube.com/watch?v=qr-8k-OeWs8

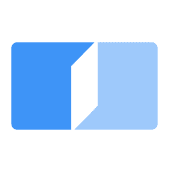

=== SHEnetics ===
in 2013, Weber founded SHEnetics (Simulated Human Experience). SHEnetics launched several solutions in the mobile sector primarily focused on the automotive industry.

=== Quantum AI Health ===
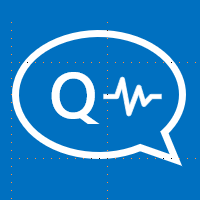

In 2022, Weber launched Quantum AI with a focus on the digital healthcare sector providing AI based solutions for physicians to automate the generation of electronic medical notes.

== Patents ==
Patent No.	Country	File Date	Grant Date	Description	Status
6,499,013	US	09/09/1998	12/24/2002	Interactive user interface using speech recognition and natural language processing	Sold to Apple
6,532,444	US	10/05/1998	03/11/2003	Network interactive user interface using speech recognition and natural language processing	Sold to Apple
6,434,524	US	10/05/1999	08/13/2002	Object interactive user interface using speech recognition and natural language processing	Sold to Apple
1110205	EP, ES, IT, FR, GB, DE	09/08/1999	01/12/2005	Interactive user interface using speech recognition and natural language processing	Sold to Apple
1110206	EP, ES, IT, FR, GB, DE	09/08/1999	12/29/2004	Network interactive user interface using speech recognition and natural language processing	Sold to Apple
