= DeepSeek (disambiguation) =

DeepSeek may refers to:

- DeepSeek, a Chinese artificial intelligence company
- DeepSeek, a chatbot created by the company of the same name.
