= Jeeney AI =

Natural language processing chatterbot

Jeeney AI is a natural language processing chatterbot.

== History ==
Jeeny AI was named "Best Overall Bot" in the 2009 Chatterbox Challenge, after ranking seventh, but being the "Best New Entry" in the previous year.

Jeeney is modeled on a modified form of Plato's 'Philosopher King' ideal, and remains a non-commercial application available for users to engage with through a text-based interface.

In 2010 Jeeney starred in experimental documentary movie Artificial Insight.

== See also ==
List of chatbots
