= Xiaowei =

Virtual assistant

Xiaowei is a virtual assistant from Tencent, the developer of WeChat. Xiaowei has weather reports, traffic updates, music requests, and news snippets. Voice recognition and facial recognition, and a "Skill platform" SDK are also available.
