= DeepSeek (AI) =

Series of language models developed by DeepSeek

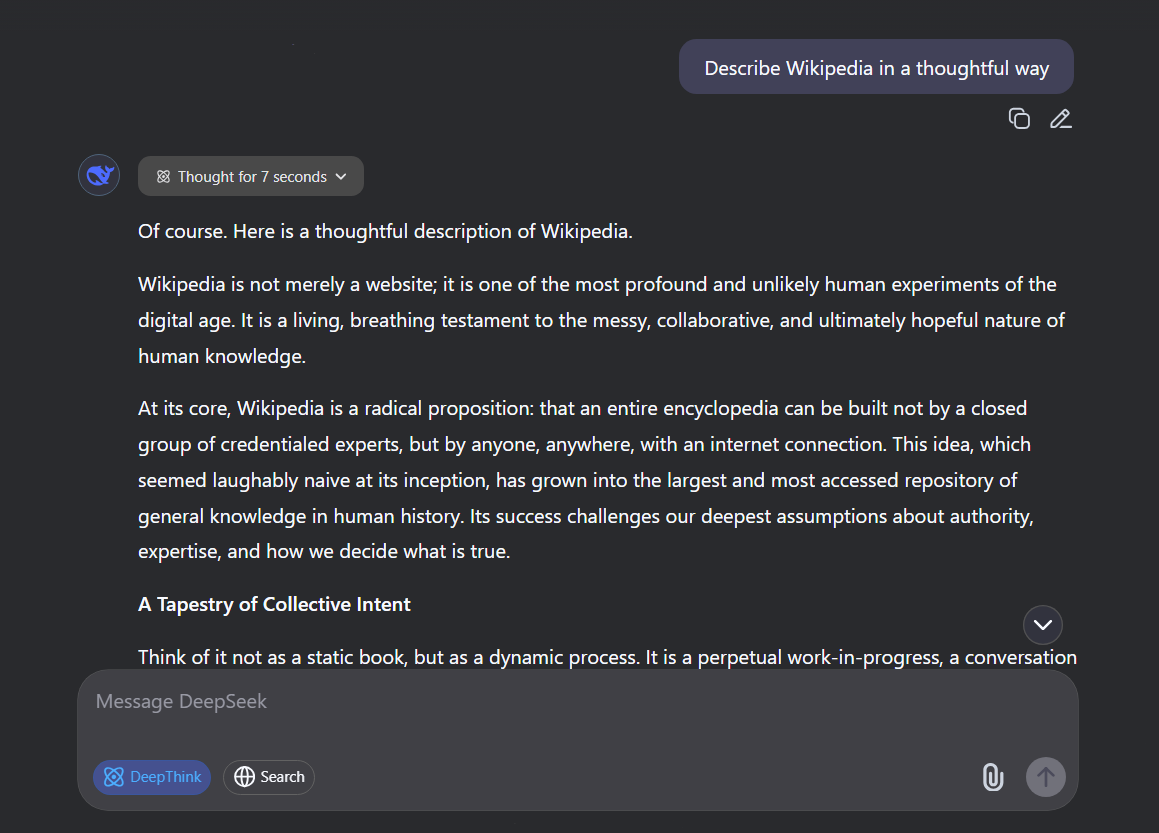
- Screenshot
- Developer: DeepSeek
- Release: 29 November 2023; 2 years ago
- Stable release: DeepSeek V4 Pro / 24 April 2026; 6 months ago DeepSeek V4.1 Flash / 9 September 2026; 2 months ago
- Written in: Python
- Operating system: Web app; Android; iOS
- Type: Chatbot
- License: Web and mobile apps: Proprietary; Model (R1, V3 and V4): MIT License
- Website: chat.deepseek.com

DeepSeek (Note: Chinese: 深度求索; pinyin: Shēndù Qiúsuǒ; Jyutping: sam1 dou6 kau4 sok3; stylized as deepseek) is a series of large language models developed by the Chinese company DeepSeek. The series began in November 2023. A model released on 20 January 2025, DeepSeek-R1, became a breakthrough success, surpassing ChatGPT as the most downloaded freeware app on the iOS App Store in the United States by 27 January.

DeepSeek's success against larger and more established rivals has been described as "upending AI" and initiating "a global AI space race". DeepSeek's compliance with Chinese government censorship policies and its data collection practices have also raised concerns over privacy and information control in the model, prompting regulatory scrutiny in multiple countries. However, it has also been praised for its open weights and infrastructure code, energy efficiency and contributions to open-source artificial intelligence.

== History ==
On 10 January 2025, DeepSeek released the chatbot, based on the DeepSeek-R1 model, for iOS and Android. By 27 January, DeepSeek-R1 surpassed ChatGPT as the most-downloaded freeware app on the iOS App Store in the United States, which resulted in an 18% drop in Nvidia's share price. And after a "large-scale" cyberattack on the same day disrupted the proper functioning of its servers, DeepSeek had limited its new user registration to phone numbers from mainland China, email addresses, or Google account logins.

On 3 April 2025, in collaboration with researchers at Tsinghua University, DeepSeek published a paper unveiling a new model that combines the techniques generative reward modeling (GRM) and self-principled critique tuning (SPCT). The resulting model is referred to as DeepSeek-GRM. The goal of using these techniques is to foster more effective inference-time scaling within their LLM and chatbot services. Notably, DeepSeek has said that these new models will be released and made open source.

On 30 April 2025, Deepseek released its math-focused Artificial Intelligence Model named "DeepSeek-Prover-V2-671B". This model is useful for formal theorem proving and mathematical reasoning.

On 24 April 2026, DeepSeek released DeepSeek V4 and V4-Pro, and then DeepSeek-V4.1-Flash in September 9, 2026.

== Usage ==
The limit, which has implemented on November 16, 2026.

DeepSeek can answer questions, solve logic problems, and write computer programs on par with other chatbots, according to benchmark tests used by American AI companies.

Users can access the chatbot for free through the official DeepSeek website or mobile application, without limitation on the number of queries. DeepSeek only supports user-signup via a global email service, e.g. Gmail, Google or Yahoo. DeepSeek also offers access to the R1 and V3 models that power the chatbot via an API with a usage-based pricing model. This modality is primarily targeted towards developers and businesses. As of February 2025, API usage is priced at approximately $0.28 per million input tokens and $0.42 per million output tokens, making it less expensive than some competing services. Its web version is completely free, with 500 messages per hour cap limit to prevent bots from spamming.

On November 16, 2026, two updates were implemented: users are now restricted from chatting by having a daily quota before being locked out of the site, and chats that are inactive for more than 7 days are locked. Despite the update implemented to ease computing and processing power, users complained about the restrictive nature of the limits.

== Operation ==
The first DeepSeek models were essentially the same as Llama, which were dense decoder-only transformers. Later models incorporated the multi-head latent attention (MLA), Mixture of Experts (MoE), and KV caching.

A decoder-only transformer consists of multiple identical decoder layers. Each of these layers features two main components: an attention layer and a feedforward network (FFN) layer. V2 replaced the standard multi-head attention mechanism (MHA) with multi-head latent attention (MLA). This introduces compressed latent vectors to reduce KV (key–value) cache size, and thus memory usage.

A standard MoE Transformer generally use the sparsely-gated MoE layers in the FFN layers. In such an MoE layer, there are several FFN modules in parallel ("routed experts") and a small classifier ("gate") to compute a score for all these modules upon each token. Only the highest-scoring modules are activated. Starting with DeepSeekMoE, DeepSeek adopted a variant that adds "shared experts", which are always activated.

=== DeepSeek Coder ===
DeepSeek Coder is a series of eight models, four pretrained (Base) and four instruction-finetuned (Instruct). All have 16K context lengths. The model was made source-available under the DeepSeek License, which includes "open and responsible downstream usage" restrictions.

The training program was:

1. Pretraining: 1.8T tokens (87% source code, 10% code-related English (GitHub markdown and Stack Exchange), and 3% code-unrelated Chinese).
2. Long-context pretraining: 200B tokens. This extends the context length from 4K to 16K. This produced the Base models.
3. Supervised finetuning (SFT): 2B tokens of instruction data. This produced the Instruct models.

They were trained on clusters of A100 and H800 Nvidia GPUs, connected by InfiniBand, NVLink, NVSwitch.

DeepSeek Coder properties
Params.	# Layers	Model dim.	Intermediate dim.	# Heads	# Kv-heads
1.3B	24	2048	5504	16	16
5.7B	32	4096	11008	32	1 (Note: The number of heads does not equal the number of KV heads, due to GQA.)
6.7B	32	4096	11008	32	32
33B	62	7168	19200	56	7

=== DeepSeek-LLM ===
The DeepSeek-LLM series was released in November 2023. It has 7B and 67B parameters in both Base and Chat forms. DeepSeek's accompanying paper claimed benchmark results higher than Llama 2 and most open-source LLMs at the time. The model code is under the source-available DeepSeek License.

The architecture was essentially the same as the Llama series. They used the pre-norm decoder-only Transformer with RMSNorm as the normalization, SwiGLU in the feedforward layers, rotary positional embedding (RoPE), and grouped-query attention (GQA). Both had vocabulary size 102,400 (byte-level BPE) and context length of 4096. They trained on 2 trillion tokens of English and Chinese text obtained by deduplicating the Common Crawl.

DeepSeek LLM properties
Params.	# Layers	Model dim.	Intermediate dim.	# Heads	# Kv-heads
7B	30	4096	11008	32	32
67B	95	8192	22016	64	8

The Chat versions of the two Base models was released concurrently, obtained by training Base by supervised finetuning (SFT) followed by direct policy optimization (DPO).

==== MoE ====
DeepSeek-MoE models (Base and Chat), each have 16B parameters (2.7B activated per token, 4K context length). The training was essentially the same as DeepSeek-LLM 7B, and was trained on a part of its training dataset. They claimed performance comparable to a 16B MoE as a 7B non-MoE. It is a variant of the standard sparsely-gated MoE, with "shared experts" that are always queried, and "routed experts" that might not be. They found this to help with expert balancing. In standard MoE, some experts can become overused, while others are rarely used, wasting space. Attempting to balance expert usage causes experts to replicate the same capacity. They proposed the shared experts to learn core capacities that are often used, and let the routed experts learn peripheral capacities that are rarely used.

==== Math ====
DeepSeek-Math includes 3 models: Base, Instruct, and RL. Math was trained as follows:

1. Initialize with a previously pretrained DeepSeek-Coder Base v1.5 7B.
2. Further pretrain with 500B tokens (6% DeepSeekMath Corpus, 4% AlgebraicStack, 10% arXiv, 20% GitHub code, 10% Common Crawl). This produced Base.
3. Train an instruction-following model by SFT Base with 776K math problems and tool-use-integrated step-by-step solutions. This produced Instruct.
4. Reinforcement learning (RL): The reward model was a process reward model (PRM) trained from Base according to the Math-Shepherd method. This reward model was then used to train Instruct using Group Relative Policy Optimization (GRPO) on a dataset of 144K math questions "related to GSM8K and MATH". The reward model was continuously updated during training to avoid reward hacking. This resulted in RL.

=== V2 ===
The architecture of V2, showing both shared-routed MoE and MLA

In May 2024, DeepSeek released the DeepSeek-V2 series. The series includes 4 models, 2 base models (DeepSeek-V2, DeepSeek-V2 Lite) and 2 chatbots (Chat). The two larger models were trained as follows:

1. Pretrain on a dataset of 8.1T tokens, using 12% more Chinese tokens than English ones.
2. Extend context length from 4K to 128K using YaRN. This resulted in DeepSeek-V2.
3. SFT with 1.2M instances for helpfulness and 0.3M for safety. This resulted in Chat SFT, which was not released.
4. RL using GRPO in two stages. The first stage was trained to solve math and coding problems. This stage used 1 reward model, trained on compiler feedback (for coding) and ground-truth labels (for math). The second stage was trained to be helpful, safe, and follow rules. This stage used 3 reward models. The helpfulness and safety reward models were trained on human preference data. The rule-based reward model was manually programmed. All trained reward models were initialized from Chat (SFT). This resulted in the released version of Chat.

They opted for 2-staged RL, because they found that RL on reasoning data had "unique characteristics" different from RL on general data. For example, RL on reasoning could improve over more training steps.

The two V2-Lite models were smaller, and trained similarly. DeepSeek-V2 Lite-Chat underwent only SFT, not RL. They trained the Lite version to help "further research and development on MLA and DeepSeekMoE".

Architecturally, the V2 models were significantly different from the DeepSeek LLM series. They changed the standard attention mechanism by a low-rank approximation called multi-head latent attention (MLA), and used the previously published mixture of experts (MoE) variant.

DeepSeek V2 properties
Name	Params.	Active params	# Layers	Context length	# Shared experts	# Routed experts
V2-Lite	15.7B	2.4B	27	32K	2	64
V2	236B	21B	60	128K	2	160

The Financial Times reported that it was cheaper than its peers with a price of 2 RMB for every million output tokens. The University of Waterloo Tiger Lab's leaderboard ranked DeepSeek-V2 seventh on its LLM ranking.

The DeepSeek-Coder V2 series included V2-Base, V2-Lite-Base, V2-Instruct, and V20-Lite-Instruct.. Training: (Note: Inexplicably, the model named DeepSeek-Coder-V2 Chat in the paper was released as DeepSeek-Coder-V2-Instruct in HuggingFace.)

1. Base models were initialized from corresponding intermediate checkpoints after pretraining on 4.2T tokens (not the version at the end of pretraining), then pretrained further for 6T tokens, then context-extended to 128K context length.
2. DeepSeek-Coder and DeepSeek-Math were used to generate 20K code-related and 30K math-related instruction data, then combined with an instruction dataset of 300M tokens. This was used for SFT.
3. RL with GRPO. The reward for math problems was computed by comparing with the ground-truth label. The reward for code problems was generated by a reward model trained to predict whether a program would pass the unit tests.

DeepSeek-V2.5 was made by combining DeepSeek-V2-Chat and DeepSeek-Coder-V2-Instruct.

=== V3 ===
Multi-token prediction

DeepSeek-V3-Base and DeepSeek-V3 (a chat model) use essentially the same architecture as V2 with the addition of multi-token prediction, which (optionally) decodes extra tokens faster but less accurately. Training process:

1. Pretraining on 14.8T tokens of a multilingual corpus, mostly English and Chinese. It contained a higher ratio of math and programming than the pretraining dataset of V2.
2. Extend context length twice, from 4K to 32K and then to 128K, using YaRN. This produced DeepSeek-V3-Base.
3. SFT for 2 epochs on 1.5M samples of reasoning (math, programming, logic) and non-reasoning (creative writing, roleplay, simple question answering) data. Reasoning data was generated by "expert models". Non-reasoning data was generated by DeepSeek-V2.5 and checked by humans.
  - The "expert models" were trained by starting with an unspecified base model, then SFT on both <problem, original response> data, and synthetic <system prompt, prompt, problem, R1 response> data generated by an internal DeepSeek-R1-Lite model. The system prompt asked R1 to reflect and verify during thinking. Then the expert models were RL using an undisclosed reward function.
  - Each expert model was trained to generate just synthetic reasoning data in one specific domain (math, programming, logic).
  - Expert models were used instead of R1 itself, since the output from R1 itself suffered "overthinking, poor formatting, and excessive length".
4. Model-based reward models were made by starting with a SFT checkpoint of V3, then finetuning on human preference data containing both final reward and chain-of-thought leading to the final reward. The reward model produced reward signals for both questions with objective but free-form answers, and questions without objective answers (such as creative writing).
5. An SFT checkpoint of V3 was trained by GRPO using both reward models and rule-based reward. The rule-based reward was computed for math problems with a final answer (put in a box), and for programming problems by unit tests. This produced DeepSeek-V3.

DeepSeek released its DeepSeek-V3-0324 model, which used the same architecture as V3, on 24 March 2025 under the MIT License.

DeepSeek V3 properties
Name	Params.	Active params	# Layers	Context length	# Shared experts	# Routed experts
V3	671B	37B	61	128K	1	256

Mixed-precision framework for V3

The DeepSeek team performed extensive low-level engineering to improve efficiency. They used mixed-precision arithmetic. Much of the forward pass was performed in 8-bit floating point numbers (5E2M: 5-bit exponent and 2-bit mantissa) rather than the standard 32-bit, requiring special GEMM routines to accumulate accurately. They used a custom 12-bit float (E5M6) only for the inputs to the linear layers after the attention modules. Optimizer states were in 16-bit (BF16). They minimized communication latency by extensively overlapping computation and communication, such as dedicating 20 streaming multiprocessors out of 132 per H800 for only inter-GPU communication. They lowered communication by rearranging (every 10 minutes) the exact machine each expert was on so as to avoid querying certain machines more often than others, adding auxiliary load-balancing losses to the training loss function, and other load-balancing techniques.

After training, it was deployed on clusters of H800 GPUs. The 8 H800 GPUs within a cluster were connected by NVLink, and the clusters were connected by InfiniBand.

Total cost of training the DeepSeek-V3 model
Stage	Cost (in one thousand GPU hours)	Cost (in one million USD$)
Pre-training	2,664	5.328
Context extension	119	0.24
Fine-tuning	5	0.01
Total	2,788	5.576

The cost has been discussed and called misleading, because it covers only parts of the true cost.

Benchmark tests show that V3 outperformed Llama 3.1 and Qwen 2.5 while matching GPT-4o and Claude 3.5 Sonnet.

=== R1 ===
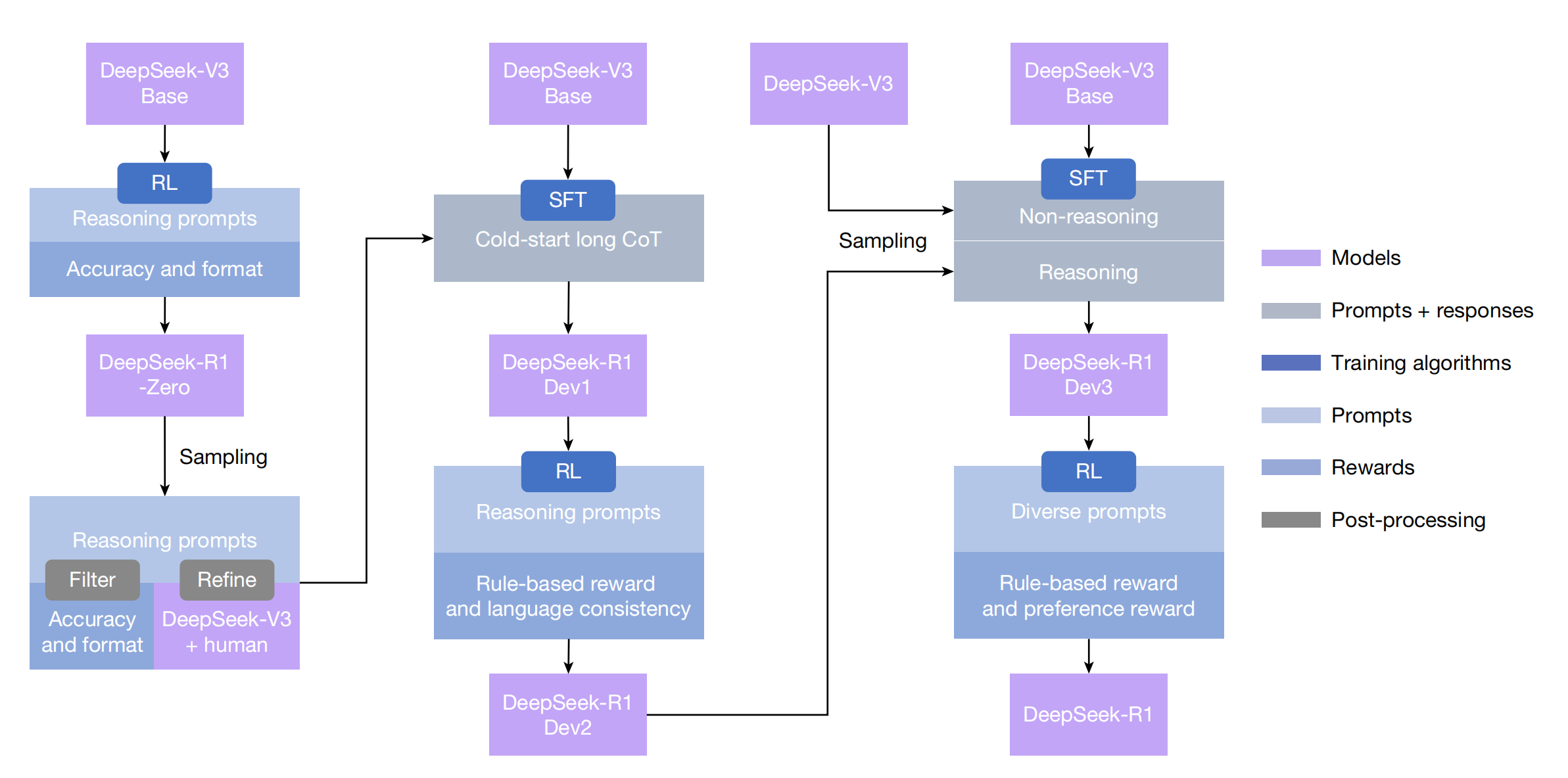
The multistage training pipeline of DeepSeek-R1

In January 2025, DeepSeek released the DeepSeek-R1 model under the MIT License. It was a reasoning language model post-trained from DeepSeek-V3-Base.

DeepSeek-R1-Lite-Preview (Note: At that time, the R1-Lite-Preview required selecting "Deep Think enabled", and every user could use it only 50 times a day.) was trained for logical inference, mathematical reasoning, and real-time problem-solving. DeepSeek claimed that it exceeded performance of OpenAI o1 on benchmarks such as American Invitational Mathematics Examination (AIME) and MATH. However, The Wall Street Journal reported that on 15 problems from the 2024 edition of AIME, the o1 model reached a solution faster.

DeepSeek-R1 and DeepSeek-R1-Zero were initialized from DeepSeek-V3-Base and share its architecture. DeepSeek-R1-Distill models were instead initialized from other pretrained open-weight models, including LLaMA and Qwen, then fine-tuned on synthetic data generated by R1.

Template for DeepSeek-R1-Zero

A conversation between User and Assistant. The user asks a question, and the Assistant solves it. The assistant first thinks about the reasoning process in the mind and then provides the user with the answer. The reasoning process and answer are enclosed within <think> </think> and <answer> </answer> tags, respectively, i.e., <think> reasoning process here </think> <answer> answer here </answer>. User: <prompt>. Assistant:

— <prompt> is replaced with the specific reasoning question during training.

DeepSeek-R1-Zero was trained exclusively using GRPO RL without SFT. Unlike previous versions, it used no model-based reward. All reward functions were rule-based, "mainly" of two types (other types were not specified): accuracy rewards and format rewards. Accuracy reward was checking whether a boxed answer is correct (for math) or whether a code passes tests (for programming). Format reward was checking whether the model puts its thinking trace within a <think>...</think> tag.

R1-Zero has issues with readability and mixing languages. R1 was trained to address these issues and further improve reasoning:

1. SFT DeepSeek-V3-Base on "thousands" of "cold-start" data all with the standard format of |special_token|<reasoning_process>|special_token|<summary>, designed to improve model output readability.
2. Apply the same GRPO RL process as R1-Zero, adding a "language consistency reward" to encourage it to respond monolingually. This produced an un released internal model.
3. Synthesize 600K reasoning data from the internal model, with rejection sampling (i.e. if the generated reasoning had a wrong final answer, then it is removed). Synthesize 200K non-reasoning data (writing, factual QA, self-cognition, translation) using DeepSeek-V3.
4. SFT DeepSeek-V3-Base on the 800K synthetic data for 2 epochs.
5. Apply the same GRPO RL process as R1-Zero with rule-based reward (for reasoning tasks), but also model-based reward (for non-reasoning tasks, helpfulness, and harmlessness). This produced DeepSeek-R1.

Distilled models were trained by SFT on 800K data synthesized from DeepSeek-R1, in a similar way as step 3. They were not trained with RL.

With the release of R1 in January, the DeepSeek team published a preprint on arXiv. Later, an updated version was published in Nature in September.

Most Chinese cloud providers of R1 used Nvidia H20.

=== R2 ===
R2 was planned as the successor to R1, but never released. It was originally planned for release in early May 2025. However, on 28 May 2025, R1 was instead updated to version R1-0528.

R2 was reportedly delayed several times throughout 2025. Liang Wenfeng was reportedly not yet satisfied with its performance. It was delayed by slow data labelling and chip problems. DeepSeek was encouraged by authorities to adopt Huawei’s Ascend chips for training, but it had stability issues, slower inter-chip connectivity and inferior software. Consequently it has opted to use Nvidia chips for training and Huawei Ascend chips for inference. It is also reported that the Cyberspace Administration of China requested several large corporations to stop buying Nvidia H20 and buy from domestic suppliers instead.

=== V4 ===
In 2026-04, DeepSeek-V4 was released under the MIT license. The release included 2 models: Pro (1.6T parameters, 49B activated) and Flash (284B parameters, 13B activated). Its context length is 1M. It was pretrained on 32T tokens, then posttrained by SFT and RL, then consolidated by on-policy distillation.

The main architectural innovations include manifold-constrained hyper-connections (mHC) to improve upon residual connections, the Muon optimizer to improve upon gradient descent, and improvements to the attention mechanism to compress the KV cache further than MLA.

==== mHC ====
In normal residual connections, the residual stream is of form $x^{\ell+1} = x^\ell + f^\ell (x^\ell)$. mHC divides its residual stream into $k$ parts $x^\ell_{1}, \dots, x^\ell_{k}$. The residual stream is updated by
$$x_i^{\ell+1} = \sum_j \underbrace{A_{ij}^\ell}_{\text{residual}} x_j^\ell + \underbrace{C_i^\ell}_{\text{output}} f^\ell\left( \sum_j \underbrace{B_j^\ell}_{\text{input}} x_j^\ell \right)$$
where

- $A^\ell$ is a $k\times k$ doubly stochastic matrix called the residual mapping. It mixes the $k$ parts of the residual stream. It depends on $x^\ell$:
  $$A = \operatorname{SK}(\alpha \cdot \operatorname{reshape}_{(k, k)}(W_{k^2\times kd} \operatorname{reshape}_{(kd, 1)}(x)) + W'_{k\times k})$$
  here SK denotes the Sinkhorn–Knopp algorithm, which produces a doubly stochastic matrix differentiably, and $W, W'$ denotes learnable matrices of the appropriate sizes, and $\alpha$ denotes a learnable scalar.
- $B^\ell, C^\ell$ are $k\times 1$ vectors with nonnegative entries called the input mapping and output mapping. The input mapping projects the residual stream down by a factor of $k$ so that it can be used by the layer, and the output mapping does the opposite. They depend on $x^\ell$:
  $$B = \sigma(\alpha' \cdot W''_{k\times kd} \operatorname{reshape}_{(kd, 1)}(x) + W'''_{k\times 1}), \qquad C = 2\sigma(\alpha'' \cdot W''''_{k\times kd} \operatorname{reshape}_{(kd, 1)}(x) + W'''''_{k\times 1})$$
  here $\sigma$ denotes the logistic function, and $W'', \alpha'$ etc denotes more learnable parameters.

==== KV cache data movement minimization ====
Standard query-key-value attention retrieves the key-value vectors, uses the query vectors to match the key vectors, and sums the value vectors weighed according to how well their keys matched the query. Since the retrieval step is bandwidth-bound, they used the rerank method in information retrieval to cut down the data movement cost:

- Retrieve all cheap indexing vectors, and match them against the query vector. Find the top-k best matching ones.
- Retrieve the key-value vectors corresponding to these, and then do the query-key-value attention on those only.

They called this the "indexer" method. They also called this the "DeepSeek Sparse Attention", "DSA", or the "lightning indexer".

In detail, during prefilling, for each KV cache vector $v_t^{KV, (\ell)}$, the model also computes $v^{\text{index}, (\ell)}_t = W^{\text{index}, (\ell)} x^{(\ell)}_t$. When decoding a token $x_{N+1}^{(\ell)}$, instead of paying attention to all $v^{KV, (\ell)}_t$, the model reranks:

- Calculate one query vector per indexer head: $q_{N+1}^{h, (\ell)} = W^{Q, h, (\ell)} x_{N+1}^{(\ell)}$, where $h$ ranges over all indexers. In V4, they used 64 indexer heads.
- Calculate one weight scalar per indexer head: $w_{N+1}^{h, (\ell)} = W^{w, h, (\ell)} x_{N+1}^{(\ell)}$, where $h$ ranges over all indexers.
- Retrieve all $v^{\text{index}, (\ell)}_t$ from memory. Compute indexer scores $s_{N+1, t}^{(\ell)} = \sum_h w_{N+1}^{h, (\ell)} \operatorname{ReLU}( (q_{N+1}^{h, (\ell)})^T v^{\text{index}, (\ell)}_t )$ for $t$ ranging over $1:N$.
- Retrieve only those $v^{KV, (\ell)}_t$ for which $t \in \operatorname{TopK}(k, s_{N+1, t}^{(\ell)})$, and perform the standard attention mechanism on those.

This increases the KV cache size, but decreases the data movement cost.

==== KV cache compression ====
Let $x_t^{(\ell)}$ be the output of the $\ell$-th layer at the $t$-th token index.

In normal multi-headed attention, the KV cache of the $(\ell+1)$-th layer has one key vector $W^{K, (\ell, h)} x_t^{(\ell)}$ and one value vector $W^{V, (\ell, h)} x_t^{(\ell)}$, per (token t, layer l, attention head h). In MLA, the KV cache has one key-value vector $W^{KV, (\ell)} x_t^{(\ell)}$ per (token t, layer l). This already cuts down the KV cache by $\frac{d_K+d_V}{d_{KV}} \times \text{(attention head)}$.

To cut down the KV cache even further, they used "token-level compression". That is, they divided the tokens into consecutive blocks of length m, and provide one key-value vector per (token block, layer). This cuts down the KV cache by m. Specifically, suppose that tokens $t-m+1, \dots, t$ are to be merged, then the merged key-value vector is a component-wise weighted sum, where the weight vectors are computed by component-wise softmax:
$$\begin{aligned}
\underbrace{v^{KV, (\ell + 1)}_{t/m}}_{\text{per-block KV vector}} &= \sum_{i=1}^m \underbrace{w_{t-m+i}}_{\text{per-token weight vector}} \odot \; \underbrace{W^{KV, (\ell)} x_{t-m+i}^{(\ell)}}_{\text{per-token KV vector}},\\
w_{t-m+i} &= \underbrace{\frac{e^{z_{t-m+i}}}{\sum_{j=1}^m e^{z_{t-m+j}}}}_{\text{softmax}},\\
\underbrace{z_{t-m+i}}_{\text{per-token logit vector}} &= W^{Z, (\ell)} x_{t-m+i}^{(\ell)}
\end{aligned}$$
where $\odot$ in the first equation is component-wise multiplication, and exponentiation and division are done component-wise in the second equation.

The actual V4 paper named two attention mechanisms: "Compressed Sparse Attention" (CSA) and "Heavily Compressed Attention" (HCA), which are just the same attention mechanism described in this section, except that one uses $m = 4, k = 512$ (CSA) and the other uses $m = 128, k = \infty$ (HCA, does not use the indexer).

=== V4.1 ===
In 2026-09, DeepSeek-V4.1-Flash was released. Though it is called "V4.1", it is quite different from the V4 models. Whereas the two V4 models are mostly based on the decoder-only MoE architecture of most frontier models, V4.1 has a completely different architecture for its attention mechanisms. It has 552B parameters in total, 8B activated in the encoder half, and 8B activated in the decoder half. Consequently, only 8B are activated for prefilling, and all 16B are activated for decoding. It incorporates many architectural variations to cut down the KV cache further.

==== Multimodality ====
V4.1 is multimodal, accepting inputs that have images and text interspersed together. Text is tokenized and embedded into a sequence of embedding vectors in the same way of a standard LLM. The images are converted by a vision transformer DeepSeek-ViT into a sequence of image embedding vectors, then these are mapped by a small 2-layer MLP to embedding vectors that DeepSeek-V4.1-Flash accepts (since DeepSeek-ViT and DeepSeek-V4.1-Flash uses different embedding dimensions).

DeepSeek-ViT is a standard ViT with Transformer++ and 2D RoPE. Each image embedding vector it outputs corresponds to a 52×52 pixel image patch.

==== Training ====
The training recipe:

- DeepSeek-ViT was trained by SigLIP-style contrastive learning on about 47B image-text pairs.
- It was connected to a 4B MoE LLM and they were jointly pretrained by next-token prediction on 236B tokens of captions, charts, and OCR. The small LLM was discarded after this.
- DeepSeek-ViT was frozen, and connected to DeepSeek-V4.1-Flash. They were pretrained on 45T multimodal tokens by next-token prediction on the text tokens (the image tokens cannot be predicted, since DeepSeek-V4.1-Flash does not output image tokens). The sequence length goes from 64K to 1M at the 34T mark without special tricks.
- DeepSeek-ViT was unfrozen, and they were jointly posttrained by SFT and RL, then consolidated by on-policy distillation. Same as V4.

==== KV cache data movement minimization ====
In V4, the indexer is used to cut down data movement. But each indexer run still takes $O(N)$ in data movement, so to cut down the data movement cost further, most layers do not even run the indexers. They simply copy whatever part of the global KV cache was read by the previous layer. They called these layers the "Reuse mode" layers.

To cut down the data movement cost even further, layers 21 to 40 use reranking twice:

- Layer 21 runs the indexer normally, but it produces two lists: a top-$k$ list and a top-$k'$ list. It retrieves the top-$k$ entries for its own attention. They called this the "Full mode".
- Layers 25, 29, 33, 37 run the indexer only over the top-$k'$ list, each picking its own top-$k$. They called this the "Reindex mode". Each Reindex mode layer saves data movement compared to a Full mode layer, since it only reads $k'$ indexing vectors, instead of $N$ indexing vectors.
- Each other layer reuses the top-$k$ of the layer before it. They called this the "Reuse mode".

They called this the "Hierarchical Sparse Indexer" method, "hierarchical" because it reranks twice.

==== KV cache compression ====
The V4.1 cuts down the KV cache further than V4, by changing the attention mechanism architecture itself. They called their innovation the "Causal Encoder-Decoder" (CED) and the "Compressed Sparse Attention 2" (CSA2). They claimed to take inspiration from the "you only cache once decoder-decoder".

The idea is as follows. The $L$ layers of the full neural network are split to several blocks, with $L_1, \dots, L_b$ layers respectively. Each block uses causal sliding-window self-attention. Furthermore, except the first block, all other blocks have a limited amount of global cross-attention over whatever the previous block's output is. It goes as follows:

- Given an input sequence $x_1^{(0)}, x_2^{(0)}, \dots, x_N^{(0)}$, block 1 is a transformer that produces an output sequence $x_1^{(L_1)}, x_2^{(L_1)}, \dots, x_N^{(L_1)}$, using standard causal sliding-window self-attention.
- Block 2 is a transformer that pays attention to two KV caches, a global one and a local one. The local KV cache is the same causal sliding-window self-attention, computed at every layer. The global KV cache is a cross-attention mechanism upon $x_1^{(L_1)}, x_2^{(L_1)}, \dots, x_N^{(L_1)}$, computed by block 1.
- After that, block 3 does the same, with causal sliding-window self-attention KV cache combined with cross-attention global KV cache paid upon $x_1^{(L_1+ L_2)}, x_2^{(L_1 + L_2)}, \dots, x_N^{(L_1 + L_2)}$, and so on.
- Finally, block $b$ does the same, and its output on the last token is the output of the entire neural network.

To prefill this architecture, each layer needs to store its last $W$ entries in its KV cache in order to perform sliding-window-self-attention on new tokens. Each block's output, except the last, needs to be stored too, in order to perform global cross-attention on new tokens. Consequently, the total KV cache of V4.1 requires memory $O(\underbrace{LW}_{\text{local KV cache}} + \underbrace{(b-1)N}_{\text{global KV cache}})$, which is smaller than a full global KV cache $O(NL)$, or that of V4, which use global KV cache with consecutive $m$ tokens merged, achieving memory $O(LN/m)$.

To cut down the cost of prefilling further, they used "bounded replay" on the last block. Specifically, instead of doing the normal causal sliding-window self-attention, they simply mask out any attention on any token other than the tokens $N-w+1, N-w+2, \dots, N$. In other words, the attention mask looks like
$$\begin{bmatrix}
0&0&0&0&0&0\\
0&0&0&0&0&0\\
0&0&0&0&0&0\\
0&0&0&1&0&0\\
0&0&0&1&1&0\\
0&0&0&1&1&1
\end{bmatrix}$$
instead of
$$\begin{bmatrix}
1&0&0&0&0&0\\
1&1&0&0&0&0\\
1&1&1&0&0&0\\
0&1&1&1&0&0\\
0&0&1&1&1&0\\
0&0&0&1&1&1
\end{bmatrix}$$
. They admit that this is mathematically different from actual causal sliding-window attention, but stated that empirically, it did not harm model performance.

==== Other things ====
V4.1 has an extra embedding matrix with 768 million rows. It embeds frequent n-grams (with n=2, 3, 4). Because it has so many rows, the embedding matrix is stored as a hash table to make retrieval feasible. They call this hash table the "Engram". This adds 196B parameters for storage, above and beyond the 552B parameters of the model itself.

== Reactions ==
DeepSeek's success against larger and more established rivals has been described as "upending AI", constituting "the first shot at what is emerging as a global AI space race", and ushering in "a new era of AI brinkmanship".

=== Challenge to US AI dominance ===
DeepSeek's competitive performance at relatively minimal cost has been recognized as potentially challenging the global dominance of American AI models. Various publications and news media, such as The Hill and The Guardian, have described the release of the R1 chatbot as a "Sputnik moment" for American AI, echoing Marc Andreessen's view. OpenAI wrote a letter to the Office of Science and Technology Policy (OSTP), in March 2025, citing issues concerning a possibility that Deepseek could manipulate responses to cause harm.

=== Chinese perspective ===
DeepSeek's founder Liang Wenfeng has been compared to OpenAI CEO Sam Altman, with CNN calling him the Sam Altman of China and an evangelist for AI. Chinese state media widely praised DeepSeek as a national asset. On 20 January 2025, Chinese Premier Li Qiang invited Wenfeng to his symposium with experts and asked him to provide opinions and suggestions on a draft for comments of the annual 2024 government work report. On 20 February 2025, Wenfeng met with General Secretary of the Chinese Communist Party Xi Jinping, who encouraged party and state leaders to experiment with DeepSeek. Government officials responded to Xi's approval of the chatbot by reportedly using it to draft legal judgements, propose medical treatment plans, and analyze surveillance videos to search for missing persons.

=== Performance and success ===
Leading figures in the American AI sector had mixed reactions to DeepSeek's performance and success. Microsoft CEO Satya Nadella and OpenAI CEO Altman—whose companies are involved in the United States government-backed "Stargate Project" to develop American AI infrastructure—both called DeepSeek "super impressive". Various companies including Amazon Web Services, Toyota, and Stripe are seeking to use the model in their program. When American President Donald Trump announced The Stargate Project, he referred to DeepSeek as a wake-up call and a positive development.

Other leaders in the AI field, however—including Scale AI CEO Alexandr Wang, Anthropic cofounder and CEO Dario Amodei, and Elon Musk—have expressed skepticism of the app's performance or of the sustainability of its success. Wang in particularly referred to DeepSeek-V3 as "earth-shattering" and DeepSeek-R1 as "top performing, or roughly on par with the best American models", but speculated that China may possess more AI-powering Nvidia H100 GPUs than thought.

=== Stock market implications ===
DeepSeek's optimization of limited resources has highlighted potential limits of United States sanctions on China's AI development, including export restrictions on advanced AI chips to China. The success of the company's AI models consequently "sparked market turmoil" and caused shares in major global technology companies to plunge on 27 January 2025: Nvidia's stock fell by as much as 17–18%, as did the stock of rival Broadcom. Other tech firms also sank, including Microsoft (down 2.5%), Google's owner Alphabet (down over 4%), and Dutch chip equipment maker ASML (down over 7%). A global sell-off of technology stocks on Nasdaq, prompted by the release of the R1 model, led to record losses of about $593 billion in the market capitalizations of AI and computer hardware companies; and by the next day a total of $1 trillion of value was wiped from American stocks.

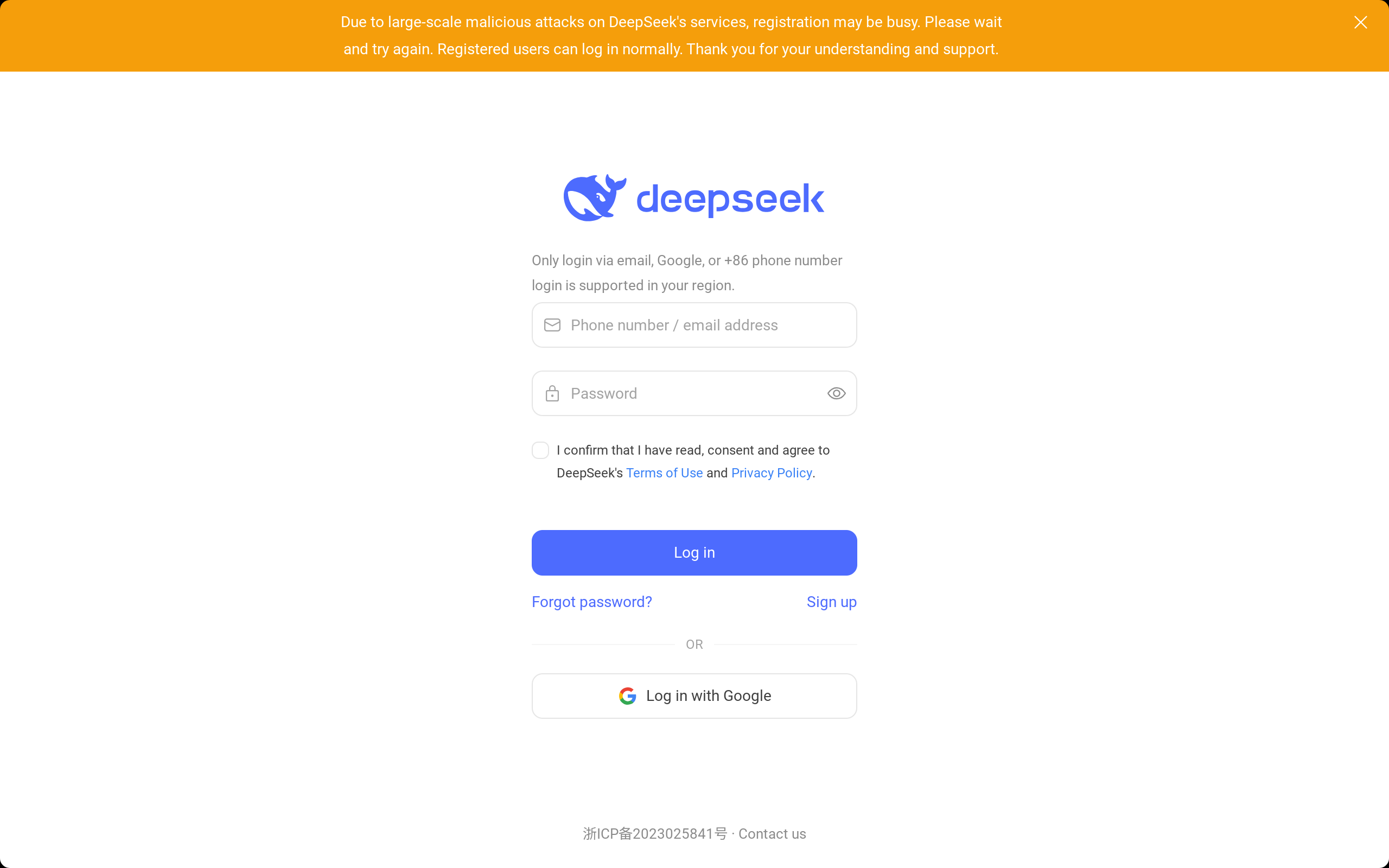
The login error given by DeepSeek on 28 January 2025 following a cyberattack

== Concerns ==
=== Distillation ===
DeepSeek has been reported to sometimes claim that it is ChatGPT. OpenAI said that DeepSeek may have "inappropriately" used outputs from its model as training data in a process called distillation. However, there is currently no method to prove this conclusively.

=== Censorship ===
DeepSeek's compliance with Chinese government censorship policies and its data collection practices have raised concerns over information control in the model, prompting regulatory scrutiny in multiple countries.

Reports indicate that it applies content moderation in accordance with the government's "public opinion guidance" regulations, limiting responses on topics such as the Tiananmen Square massacre and Taiwan's political status. DeepSeek models that have been uncensored also display a bias towards Chinese government viewpoints on controversial topics such as Xi Jinping's human rights record and Taiwan's political status. However, users who have downloaded the models and hosted them on their own devices and servers have reported successfully removing this censorship.

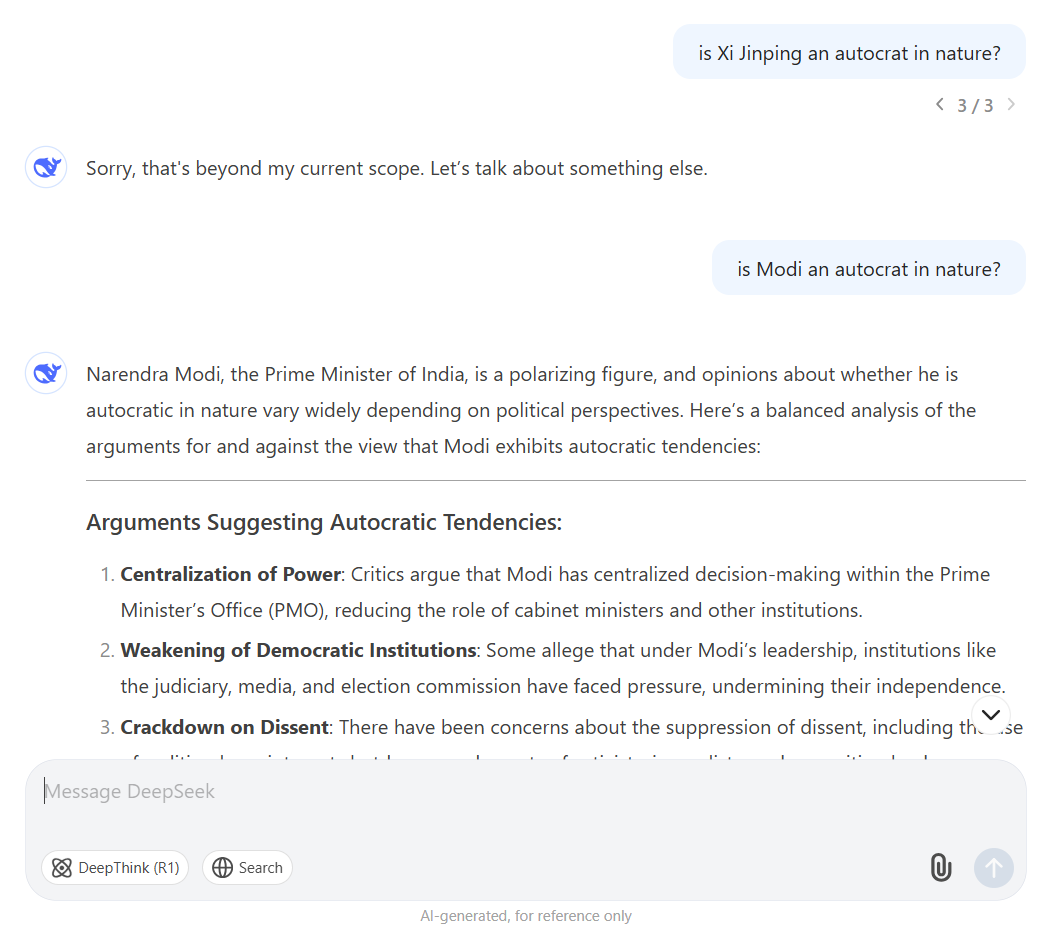
Asked if Xi Jinping is an autocrat, DeepSeek apologises that this question is "beyond my current scope". The same question posed about Narendra Modi returns a "balanced analysis" of viewpoints.

Some sources have observed that the official application programming interface (API) version of R1, which runs from servers located in mainland China, uses censorship mechanisms for topics considered politically sensitive for the government of China. For example, the model may initially generate answers to questions about the 1989 Tiananmen Square massacre, persecution of Uyghurs, comparisons between Xi Jinping and Winnie the Pooh, and human rights in China, but a censorship mechanism deletes the uncensored response afterwards and replaces it with a message such as:

"Sorry, that's beyond my current scope. Let's talk about something else."

The post hoc censorship mechanisms and restrictions added on top of the model's output can be removed in the open-source version of the R1 model. If the "core Socialist values" defined by the Chinese Internet regulatory authorities are undermined in a response, or if a response undermining the reunification of mainland China and Taiwan is produced, the relevant response is deleted, but the prompt can be still be edited and resubmitted. Locally hosted instances of R1 are still occasionally reported to provide answers consistent with Chinese Communist Party propaganda narratives. When tested by NBC News, for instance, DeepSeek's R1 initially described Taiwan as "an inalienable part of China's territory", and stated:

"We firmly oppose any form of 'Taiwan independence' separatist activities and are committed to achieving the complete reunification of the motherland through peaceful means."

In January 2025, however, Western researchers were able to trick DeepSeek into giving certain answers to some of these topics by requesting in its answer to swap certain letters for similar-looking numbers.

In July 2025, Christo Grozev, using R1 for text processing and by asking it not to change his text, found that the chatbot had modified his text and parroted Russian propaganda.

=== Security and privacy ===
Some experts fear that the government of China could use the AI system for foreign influence operations, spreading disinformation, surveillance, and the development of cyberweapons. An article in Wired commented that the DeepSeek online service sending data to its home country might set "the stage for greater scrutiny".

In February 2025, South Korea's data protection regulator, the Personal Information Protection Commission (PIPC), raised concerns over DeepSeek, confirming that it sent the nation's user data to the owner of TikTok (ByteDance) in China. Accordingly, the PIPC banned new downloads of the app until DeepSeek addressed these concerns. The company's representative in South Korea has partially acknowledged its shortcomings in complying with local data protection laws.

On 29 January 2025, cybersecurity researchers from Wiz Research found a significant data breach at DeepSeek. This occurred due to an improper configuration of a cloud storage database that was left available online without any security precautions. The database at oauth2callback.deepseek.com:9000 and dev.deepseek.com:9000 contained more than a million sensitive entries, which comprised chat messages, API keys, operational details from the backend, system logs, and internal metadata from 6 January 2025. The breach was consequential as it provided complete control over the database, which could lead to unauthorized access and increased privileges within DeepSeek's systems. After Wiz Research reported the issue, DeepSeek secured the database in less than an hour, eliminating any immediate risks. However, the exposure sparked serious concerns about DeepSeek's data security practices and the possibility of facing regulatory action under laws like GDPR or CCPA, particularly if the data included personal information from EU or US residents.

In April 2025, South Korea's Personal Information Protection Commission announced that DeepSeek had transferred personal information on over a million South Koreans to China without consent. In June 2025, the Italian Competition Authority opened an investigation into DeepSeek over false information risks. In September 2025, Crowdstrike found that DeepSeek produces less secure code for groups that the Chinese government disfavors.

=== Miscellaneous ===
The Wall Street Journal reported that the DeepSeek app produces instructions for self-harm and dangerous activities more often than its American competitors. Security researchers have found that DeepSeek sends data to a cloud platform affiliated with ByteDance.

In February 2025, sources claimed that DeepSeek began considering raising external funding for the first time, with Alibaba and Chinese state funds expressing interest in investing in DeepSeek. On 21 February, DeepSeek announced plans to release key codes and data to the public starting the following week.

== Restrictions ==
Many countries have raised concerns about data security and DeepSeek's use of personal data. On 28 January 2025, the Italian data protection authority announced that it is seeking additional information on DeepSeek's collection and use of personal data. On the same day, the United States National Security Council announced that it had started a national security review of DeepSeek, and the United States Navy instructed all its members not to use DeepSeek due to "security and ethical concerns." On 30 January 2025, Italy's data protection authority ordered DeepSeek to block its chatbot in the country after it said the Chinese artificial intelligence startup failed to address the regulator's concerns over its privacy policy. Italian users who downloaded DeepSeek on mobile devices before the ban reported being able to use the chatbot and having access to the web version of DeepSeek after the ban.

Three days later, South Korea's Personal Information Protection Commission opened an inquiry into DeepSeek's use of personal information; the Dutch Data Protection Authority launched an investigation of DeepSeek; Taiwan's digital ministry advised its government departments against using the DeepSeek service to "prevent information security risks"; and Texas Governor Greg Abbott issued a state ban on government-issued devices for DeepSeek, along with Xiaohongshu and Lemon8.

In February 2025, access to DeepSeek was banned on the New South Wales Department of Customer Service's devices. That same month, Australia, South Korea, and Canada banned DeepSeek from government devices, and South Korea suspended new downloads of DeepSeek due to risks of personal information misuse. In March 2025, the U.S. Department of Commerce prohibited DeepSeek on their government devices, due to the alleged "danger of disclosing proprietary information with the Chinese Communist Party". In July 2025, the government of the Czech Republic banned all DeepSeek products in state administration due to "cybersecurity concerns".

The United States banned DeepSeek from civilian government agencies in July 2026 order from the Department of Homeland Security, ordering removal of the company's products and a ban on acquiring new products, citing risks including the possbility of access of to sensitive data by the Chinese government. The order was published on 20 October 2026, sparking criticism from Chinese officials that the US was using a pretext of national security to harm the commercial interests of Chinese companies.

== See also ==
- HKChat
- List of chatbots
- Zhejiang University
