= Assistant (by Speaktoit) =

Personal assistant application for mobile devices

- Developer: Speaktoit
- Initial release: 1 March 2011; 14 years ago
- Operating system: Cross-platform: Android, iOS, Windows Phone, Windows 8, Windows 10, Google Chrome Extension
- Platform: ARM, IA-32, x86-64
- Available in: 11 languages
- List of languages: Chinese (Cantonese and Mandarin); English; French; German; Italian; Japanese; Korean; Portuguese (European and Brazilian); Russian; Spanish
- Type: Intelligent software assistant
- License: Proprietary
- Website: assistant.ai (now redirects to api.ai's website)

Assistant was an intelligent personal assistant application for mobile devices developed by Speaktoit. Originally launched in October 2011 for the Android platform, Assistant was later made available on iOS and Windows Phones. Assistant used natural language processing and speech recognition to interact with its users and was able to have clarifying conversations.

The New York Times recognized Assistant as one of the top 10 Android Apps of 2011.

Assistant was discontinued on December 15, 2016. All web links to the app now redirect to api.ai's website.

== See also ==
- Vlingo
- api.ai
