= HKChat =

Large language model-based chatbot

- Developer: HKChat OmniServe Limited
- Release: 20 November 2025; 11 months ago
- Operating system: Android, iOS, Windows, HarmonyOS
- Type: Chatbot
- Website: hkchat.org

HKChat (Chinese: 港話通) is a large language model-based chatbot developed by HKChat OmniServe Limited (Chinese: 港話通全維服務有限公司) in Hong Kong.

== History ==
HKChat's development commenced in 2025 to provide a local chatbot service for Hong Kong citizens, alongside other AI-related offerings.

The public beta version of HKChat was released on 20 November 2025. However, it was not released without instability and hallucinations.

In June 2026, the Hong Kong Generative AI R&D Center announced the use of new HKGAI V3 LLM in HKChat.

== Models ==
HKChat is based on the HKGAI V3 model developed by the Hong Kong Generative AI R&D Center (Chinese: 香港生成式人工智能研發中心), which is essentially the localized DeepSeek model trained with Hong Kong data, values and cultural awareness, while employing mainland Chinese hardware.

The HKGAI V3 model also forms the base of the HKGAI ecosystem that includes but are not limited to HKPilot (Chinese: 港文通), HKMeeting (Chinese: 港會通), LexiHK (Chinese: 港法通) and HKEcoLink (Chinese: 港環通) with government adoption reported.

== Usage ==
HKChat is designated to answer questions related to daily life in Hong Kong and generate related content, for example, recipes while being capable of providing preliminary legal advice and translating texts.

Aside from text and voice input, HKChat also supports image recognition, "news flash" section provided by Dot Dot News and other localised functions for everyday life in the city. Since November 2026, HKChat users may use the app to generate music using the YuE2, an open source music generation model developed by HKGAI.
