= Casillo =

Casillo is an Italian surname. Notable people with the surname include:

- Alessandro Casillo (born 1996), Italian singer
- Vincenzo Casillo (1942–1983), Italian Camorrista

== See also ==
- Castillo (surname)
