= MegaHAL =

MegaHAL is a computer conversation simulator, or "chatterbot", created by Jason Hutchens.

== Background ==
In 1996, Jason Hutchens entered the Loebner Prize Contest with HeX, a chatterbot based on ELIZA. HeX won the competition that year and took the $2000 prize for having the highest overall score. In 1998, Hutchens again entered the Loebner Prize Contest with his new program, MegaHAL. MegaHAL made its debut in the 1998 Loebner Prize Contest. Like many chatterbots, the intent is for MegaHAL to appear as a human fluent in a natural language. As a user types sentences into MegaHAL, MegaHAL will respond with sentences that are sometimes coherent and at other times complete gibberish. MegaHAL learns as the conversation progresses, remembering new words and sentence structures. It will even learn new ways to substitute words or phrases for other words or phrases. Many would consider conversation simulators like MegaHAL to be a primitive form of artificial intelligence. However, MegaHAL doesn't understand the conversation or even the sentence structure. It generates its conversation based on sequential and mathematical relationships.

In the world of conversation simulators, MegaHAL is based on relatively old technology and could be considered primitive. However, its popularity has grown due to its humorous nature; it has been known to respond with twisted or nonsensical statements that are often amusing.

== Theory of Operation ==
MegaHal is based at least in part on a so-called "hidden Markov Model", so that the first thing that Megahal does when it "trains" on a script or text is to build a database of text fragments encompassing every possible subset of perhaps 4, 5, or even 6 consecutive words, so that for example - if MegaHal trains on the Declaration of Independence, then MegaHal will build a database containing text fragments such as "When in the course", "in the course of", "the course of human", "course of human events", "of human events, one", "human events, one people", and so on. Then if Megahal is fed another text, such has "Superman, Yes! It's Superman - he can change the course of mighty rivers, bend steel with his bare hands - and who disguised at Clark Kent …" IT MIGHT induce Megahal to apparently bemuse itself to proffer whether Superman can change the course of human events, or something else altogether - such as some rambling about "when in the course of mighty rivers", and so on. Thus likewise - if a phrase like "the White house said" comes up a lot in some text; then Megahal's ability to switch randomly between different contexts which otherwise share some similarity can result at times in some surprising lucidity, or else it might otherwise seem quite bizarre.

== Examples ==
There are some sentences that MegaHAL generated:

CHESS IS A FUN SPORT, WHEN PLAYED WITH SHOT GUNS.

and

COWS FLY LIKE CLOUDS BUT THEY ARE NEVER COMPLETELY SUCCESSFUL.

== Distribution ==
MegaHAL is distributed under the Unlicense. Its source code can be downloaded from the Github repository.

== See also ==
- Loebner prize
- ELIZA
