= Antonio Casilli =

Italian sociologist (born 1972)

Antonio A. Casilli
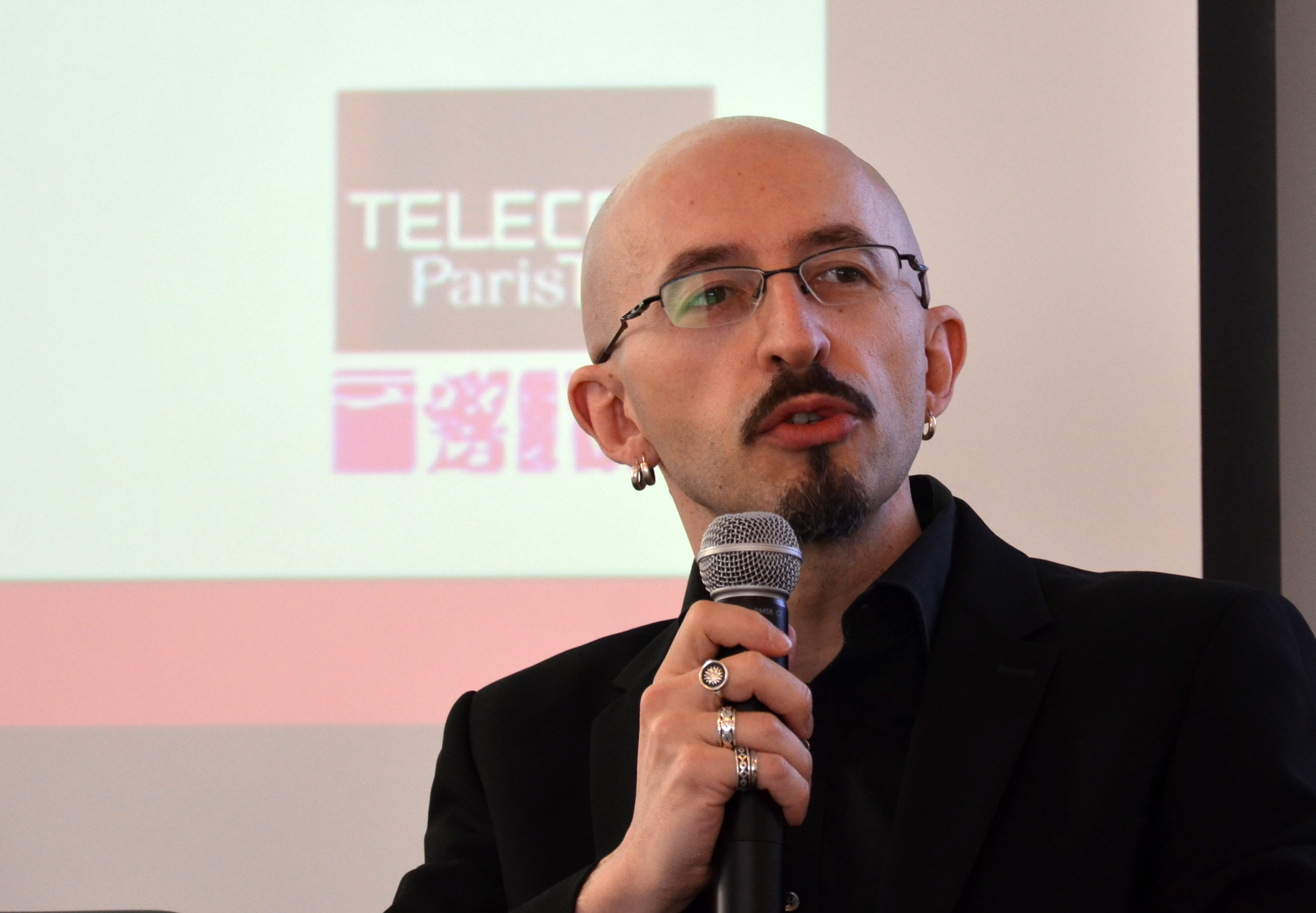
- Casilli at the French National Center for Scientific Research
- Born: 18 February 1972 (age 54); Italy
- Title: Professor of Sociology

Academic background
- Education: Bocconi University; School for Advanced Studies in the Social Sciences
- Doctoral advisor: Georges Vigarello

Academic work
- Discipline: Sociology; Digital Humanities
- Sub-discipline: Sociology of the Internet
- Institutions: Télécom Paris; Polytechnic Institute of Paris
- Main interests: Social networks; Digital labor; Internet privacy
- Notable works: Waiting for Robots. The Hired Hands of Automation (University of Chicago Press, 2025)
- Website: https://www.casilli.fr/

Antonio A. Casilli (born 1972) is a Professor of Sociology at Télécom Paris, the school of telecommunications engineering of the Polytechnic Institute of Paris, and an Associate Researcher at the School for Advanced Studies in the Social Sciences. His research focuses on computer-mediated communication, labour, and fundamental rights. He has been a regular commentator at La Grande Table and Place de la Toile on France Culture.

== Research Domains ==
After his first work on the impact of industrial technologies on the imagery of the body, under the influence of Donna Haraway and Antonio Negri, he studied the communicational violence and digital cultures. In Les Liaisons numériques, he analyses the uses of information and communications technologies and the impact of practices of the representation of the self (avatars, photos, and autobiographical accounts) on social structures, communication codes, social capital and privacy. His research also explores the relationship between information technologies and health. His methods combine participant observation and advanced research tools for social research such as multi-agent systems and social network analysis.

=== Privacy on social media ===
Antonio Casilli studies the concept of privacy, criticising the hypothesis of the end of privacy as a consequence of the uses of social media. Instead of arguing that privacy is disappearing, he observes a change of perception in society. The privacy of an individual is characterised by the construction and the management of online social capital. Casilli proposes a new representation model of privacy, where it is learnt as a negotiable entity: not purely from an individual decision, but from a permanent negotiation. In this case, social media users adapt to the publication of personal information in their social circles, and on the feedback given by their contacts. The private and public characteristics do not intervene first but as a function of collective variables.

=== Digital labor ===
Casilli's main theoretical contribution concerns the transformation of labor by digital platforms. Notably, how automation, instead of causing a replacement of jobs, in reality, displaces them through business outsourcing processes and the reduction of human action to its smallest possible unit: a click (a process called taskification). Digital labour platforms play a fundamental role in breaking up and outsourcing these tasks to millions of workers around the world, most of them located in developing countries. According to him, these platforms render the human labour invisible to consumers, but it is nonetheless essential to train, maintain, correct, and even impersonate artificial intelligence systems.

In his book Waiting for Robots. The Hired Hands of Automation (University of Chicago Press, 2025, initially published in French as En attendant les Robots, Éditions du Seuil, 2019), Casilli identifies three types of platforms where users—and workers—provide digital labor:

- "On-demand" services, such as Uber and Foodora.
- "Micro-work" platforms, such as Amazon Mechanical Turk.
- Social media platforms, such as Facebook and YouTube.

== Bibliography ==
- La Fabbrica libertina. De Sade e il sistema industriale, Manifesto Libri, 1997.
- Stop mobbing. DeriveApprodi, 2000.
- Les liaisons numériques: Vers une nouvelle sociabilité ?. Seuil. 2010. p. 331. ISBN 978-2020986373.
- (With Paola Tubaro et Yasaman Sarabi) Against the hypothesis of the end of privacy, Springer, 2014.
- With Dominique Cardon, Qu'est-ce que le Digital Labor ?. INA. 2015. p. 104. ISBN 978-2869382299.
- En attendant les robots. Enquête sur le travail du clic. Seuil. 2019. p. 400. ISBN 9782021401882.
- Waiting for Robots. The hired hands of automation. University of Chicago Press. 2025. p. 336. ISBN 9780226820958.
