= Virtual assistant =

Software agent

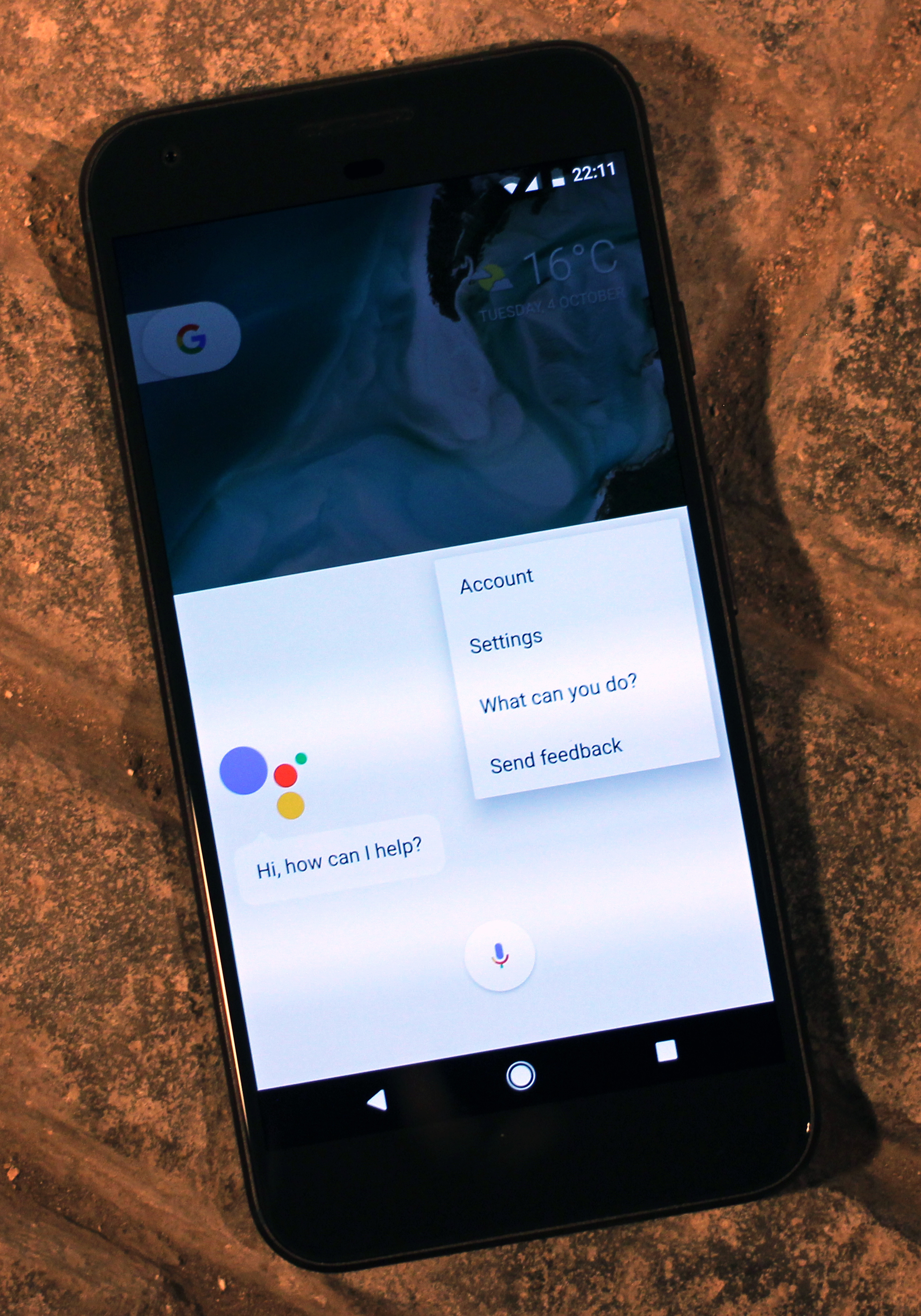
Google Assistant running on a Pixel XL smartphone

A virtual assistant (VA) is a software agent that can perform a range of tasks or services for a user based on user input, such as commands or questions, including verbal ones. Such technologies often incorporate chatbot capabilities to streamline task execution. The interaction may be via text, graphical interface, or voice, as some virtual assistants are able to interpret human speech and respond via synthesized voices.

In many cases, users can ask their virtual assistants questions, control home automation devices and media playback, and manage other basic tasks such as email, to-do lists, and calendars – all with verbal commands. In recent years, prominent virtual assistants for direct consumer use have included Apple Siri, Amazon Alexa, Google Assistant (Gemini), Microsoft Copilot and Samsung Bixby. Also, companies in various industries often incorporate some kind of virtual assistant technology into their customer service or support.

Into the 2020s, the emergence of artificial intelligence based chatbots, such as ChatGPT, has brought increased capability and interest to the field of virtual assistant products and services.

== History ==
=== Experimental decades: 1910s–1980s ===
Radio Rex was the first voice-activated toy, patented in 1916 and released in 1922. It was a wooden toy in the shape of a dog that would come out of its house when its name is called.

In 1952, Bell Labs presented "Audrey", the Automatic Digit Recognition machine. It occupied a six-foot-high relay rack, consumed substantial power, had streams of cables and exhibited the myriad maintenance problems associated with complex vacuum-tube circuitry. It could recognize the fundamental units of speech, phonemes. It was limited to the accurate recognition of digits spoken by designated talkers. It could therefore be used for voice dialing, but in most cases, push-button dialing was cheaper and faster, rather than speaking the consecutive digits.

Another early tool which was enabled to perform digital speech recognition was the IBM Shoebox voice-activated calculator, presented to the general public during the 1962 Seattle World's Fair after its initial market launch in 1961. This early computer, developed almost 20 years before the introduction of the first IBM Personal Computer in 1981, was able to recognize 16 spoken words and the digits 0 to 9.

The first natural language processing computer program or the chatbot ELIZA was developed by MIT professor Joseph Weizenbaum in the 1960s. It was created to "demonstrate that the communication between man and machine was superficial". ELIZA used pattern matching and substitution methodology into scripted responses to simulate conversation, which gave an illusion of understanding on the part of the program.

Weizenbaum's own secretary reportedly asked Weizenbaum to leave the room so that she and ELIZA could have a real conversation. Weizenbaum was surprised by this, later writing: "I had not realized ... that extremely short exposures to a relatively simple computer program could induce powerful delusional thinking in quite normal people.

This gave name to the ELIZA effect, the tendency to unconsciously assume computer behaviors are analogous to human behaviors; that is, anthropomorphisation, a phenomenon present in human interactions with virtual assistants.

The next milestone in the development of voice recognition technology was achieved in the 1970s at the Carnegie Mellon University in Pittsburgh, Pennsylvania with substantial support of the United States Department of Defense and its DARPA agency, funded five years of a Speech Understanding Research program, aiming to reach a minimum vocabulary of 1,000 words. Companies and academia including IBM, Carnegie Mellon University (CMU) and Stanford Research Institute took part in the program.

The result was "Harpy", it mastered about 1000 words, the vocabulary of a three-year-old and it could understand sentences. It could process speech that followed pre-programmed vocabulary, pronunciation, and grammar structures to determine which sequences of words made sense together, and thus reducing speech recognition errors.

In 1986, Tangora was an upgrade of the Shoebox, it was a voice recognizing typewriter. Named after the world's fastest typist at the time, it had a vocabulary of 20,000 words and used prediction to decide the most likely result based on what was said in the past. IBM's approach was based on a hidden Markov model, which adds statistics to digital signal processing techniques. The method makes it possible to predict the most likely phonemes to follow a given phoneme. Still each speaker had to individually train the typewriter to recognize their voice, and pause between each word.

In 1983, Gus Searcy invented the "Butler in a Box", an electronic voice home controller system.

=== Birth of smart virtual assistants: 1990s–2010s ===
In the 1990s, digital speech recognition technology became a feature of the personal computer with IBM, Philips and Lernout & Hauspie fighting for customers. Much later the market launch of the first smartphone IBM Simon in 1994 laid the foundation for smart virtual assistants as we know them today.

In 1997, Dragon's NaturallySpeaking software could recognize and transcribe natural human speech without pauses between each word into a document at a rate of 100 words per minute. A version of Naturally Speaking is still available for download and it is still used today, for instance, by many doctors in the US and the UK to document their medical records.

In 2001 Colloquis publicly launched SmarterChild, on platforms like AIM and MSN Messenger. While entirely text-based SmarterChild was able to play games, check the weather, look up facts, and converse with users to an extent.

The first modern digital virtual assistant installed on a smartphone was Siri, which was introduced as a feature of the iPhone 4S on 4 October 2011. Apple Inc. developed Siri following the 2010 acquisition of Siri Inc., a spin-off of SRI International, which is a research institute financed by DARPA and the United States Department of Defense. Its aim was to aid in tasks such as sending a text message, making phone calls, checking the weather or setting up an alarm. Over time, it has developed to provide restaurant recommendations, search the internet, and provide driving directions.

In November 2014, Amazon announced Alexa alongside the Echo. In 2016, Salesforce debuted Einstein, developed from a set of technologies underlying the Salesforce platform. Einstein was replaced by Agentforce, an agentic AI, in September 2024. In April 2017, Amazon released a service for building conversational interfaces for any type of virtual assistant or interface.

=== Large language models: 2020s-present ===
In the 2020s, artificial intelligence (AI) systems like ChatGPT have gained popularity for their ability to generate human-like responses to text-based conversations. In February 2020, Microsoft introduced its Turing Natural Language Generation (T-NLG), which was then the "largest language model ever published at 17 billion parameters." On 30 November 2022, ChatGPT was launched as a prototype and quickly garnered attention for its detailed responses and articulate answers across many domains of knowledge. The advent of ChatGPT and its introduction to the wider public increased interest and competition in the space. In February 2023, Google began introducing an experimental service called "Bard" which is based on its LaMDA program to generate text responses to questions asked based on information gathered from the web.

While ChatGPT and other generalized chatbots based on the latest generative AI are capable of performing various tasks associated with virtual assistants, there are also more specialized forms of such technology that are designed to target more specific situations or needs.

== Method of interaction ==
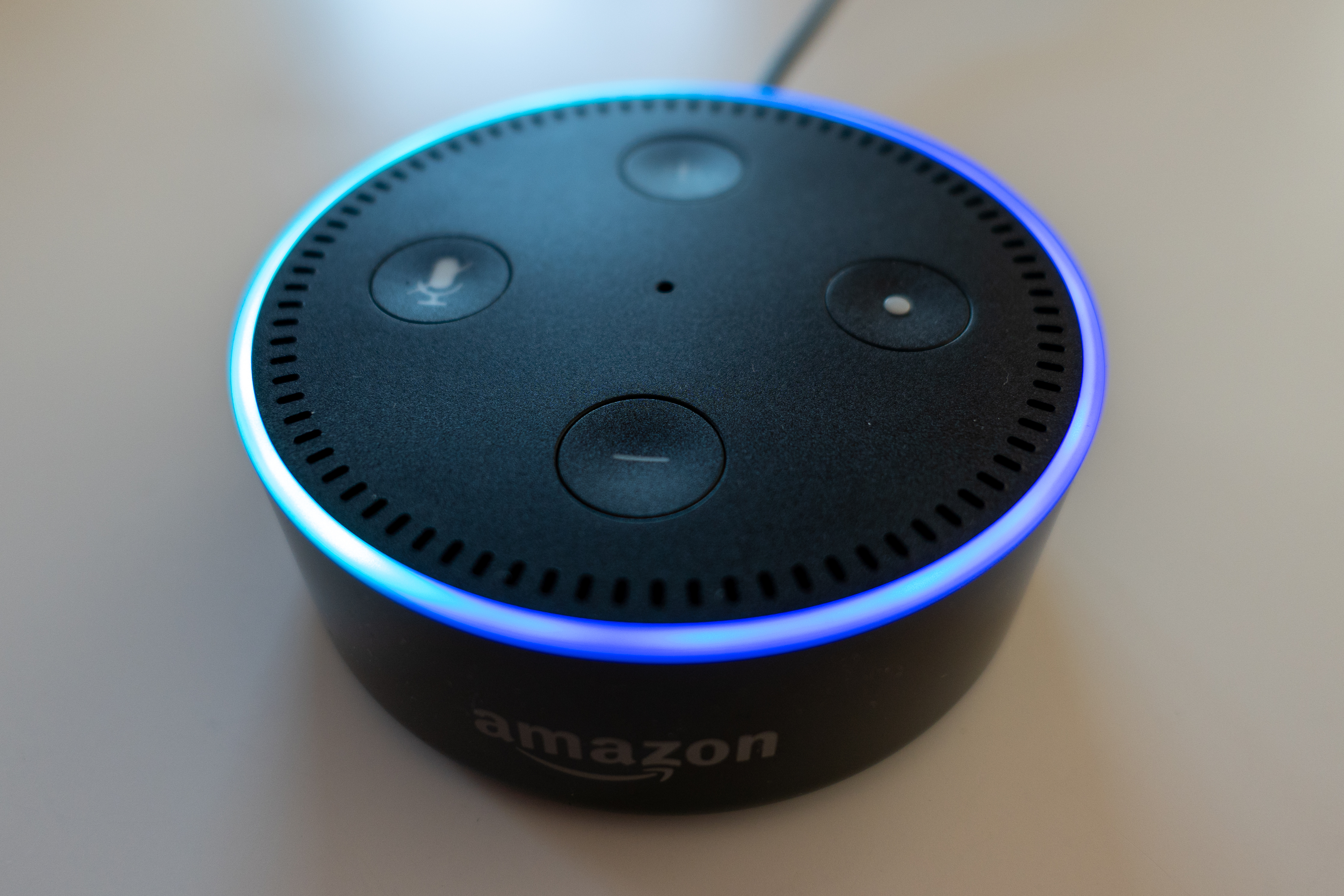
Amazon Echo Dot smart speaker running the Alexa virtual assistant

Virtual assistants work via:

- Text, including: online chat (especially in an instant messaging application or other application ), SMS text, e-mail or other text-based communication channel, for example Conversica's intelligent virtual assistants for business.
- Voice: for example with Amazon Alexa on Amazon Echo devices, Siri on an iPhone, Google Assistant on Google-enabled Android devices, or Bixby on Samsung devices.
- Images: some assistants, such as Google Assistant (which includes Google Lens) and Bixby on the Samsung Galaxy series, have the added capability of performing image processing to recognize objects in images.

Many virtual assistants are accessible via multiple methods, offering versatility in how users can interact with them, whether through chat, voice commands, or other integrated technologies.

Virtual assistants use natural language processing (NLP) to match user text or voice input to executable commands. Some continually learn using artificial intelligence techniques including machine learning and ambient intelligence.

To activate a virtual assistant using the voice, a wake word might be used. This is a word or groups of words such as "Hey Siri", "OK Google" or "Hey Google", "Alexa", and "Hey Microsoft". As virtual assistants become more popular, there are increasing legal risks involved.

== Devices and objects ==
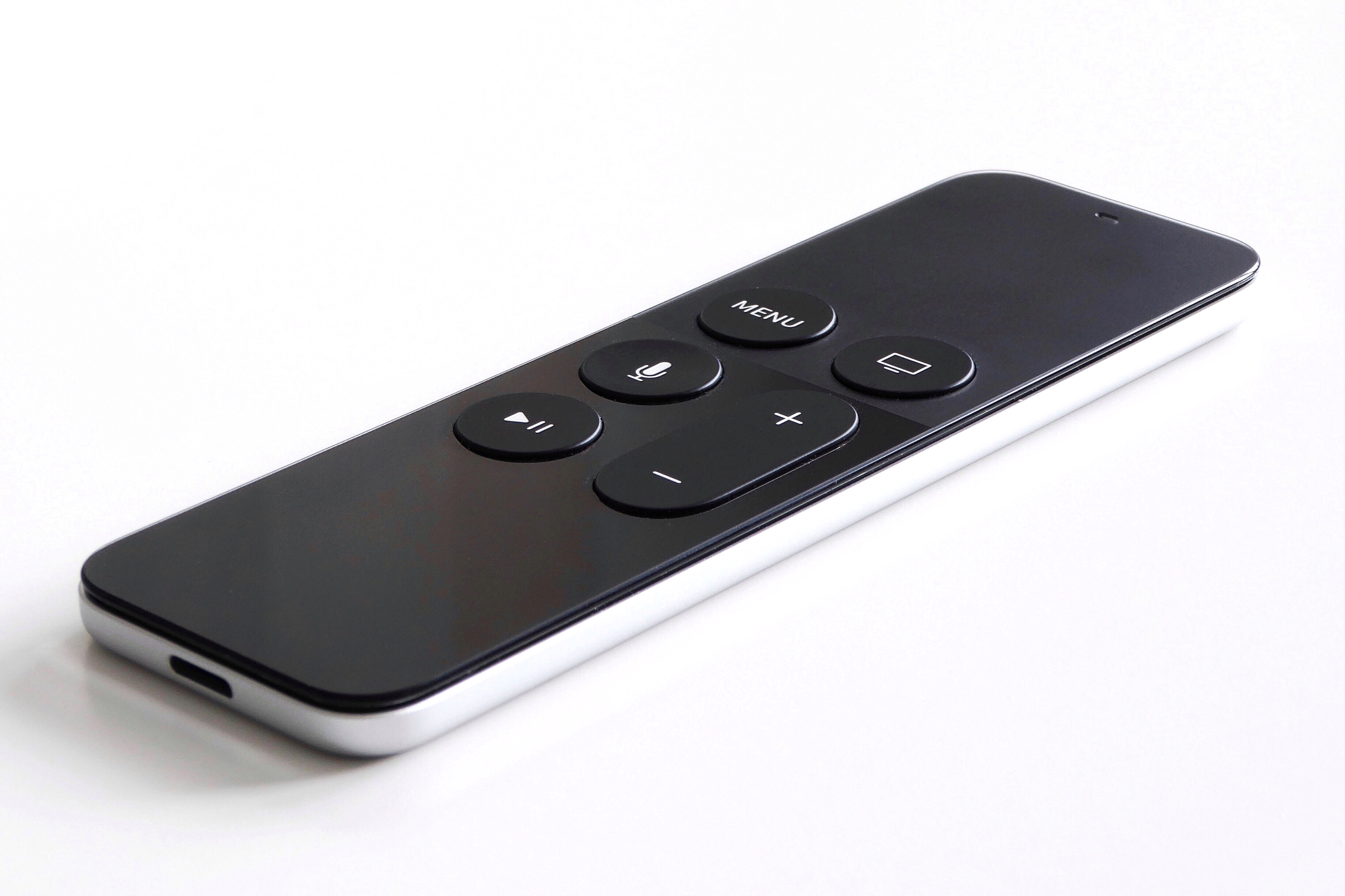
Apple TV remote control, with which users can ask the virtual assistant Siri to find content to watch

Virtual assistants may be integrated into many types of platforms or, like Amazon Alexa, across several of them:

- Into devices like smart speakers such as Amazon Echo, Google Home and Apple HomePod
- In instant messaging applications on both smartphones and via the Web, e.g. M (virtual assistant) on both Facebook and Facebook Messenger apps or via the Web
- Built into a mobile operating system (OS), as are Apple's Siri on iOS devices and BlackBerry Assistant on BlackBerry 10 devices, or into a desktop OS such as Cortana on Microsoft Windows OS
- Built into a smartphone independent of the OS, as is Bixby on the Samsung Galaxy S8 and Note 8.
- Within instant messaging platforms, assistants from specific organizations, such as Aeromexico's Aerobot on Facebook Messenger or WeChat Secretary.
- Within mobile apps from specific companies and other organizations, such as Dom from Domino's Pizza
- In appliances, cars, and wearable technology such as the Ai Pin
- Previous generations of virtual assistants often worked on websites, such as Alaska Airlines' Ask Jenn, or on interactive voice response (IVR) systems such as American Airlines' IVR by Nuance.

== Services ==
Virtual assistants can provide a wide variety of services. These include:

- Provide information such as weather, facts from e.g. Wikipedia or IMDb, set an alarm, make to-do lists and shopping lists
- Play music from streaming services such as Spotify and Pandora; play radio stations; read audiobooks
- Play videos, TV shows or movies on televisions, streaming from e.g. Netflix
- Conversational commerce (see below)
- Assist public interactions with government (see Artificial intelligence in government)
- Complement and/or replace human customer service specialists in domains like healthcare, sales, and banking. One report estimated that an automated online assistant produced a 30% decrease in the work-load for a human-provided call centre.
- Enhance the driving experience by enabling interaction with virtual assistants like Siri and Alexa while in the car.

=== Conversational commerce ===
Conversational commerce is e-commerce via various means of messaging, including via voice assistants but also live chat on e-commerce Web sites, live chat on messaging applications such as WeChat, Facebook Messenger and WhatsApp and chatbots on messaging applications or Web sites.

=== Customer support ===
A virtual assistant can work with customer support team of a business to provide 24x7 support to customers. It provides quick responses, which enhances a customer's experience. Businesses in service industries have deployed AI voice assistants to handle routine customer interactions such as appointment booking and order taking, particularly for after-hours coverage. These implementations often use industry-specific training to understand domain terminology and integrate with existing business software.

=== Third-party services ===
Amazon enables Alexa "Skills" and Google "Actions", essentially applications that run on the assistant platforms.

== Privacy ==
Virtual assistants have a variety of privacy concerns associated with them. Features such as activation by voice pose a threat, as such features requires the device to always be listening. Modes of privacy such as the virtual security button have been proposed to create a multilayer authentication for virtual assistants.

=== Google Assistant ===
The privacy policy of Google Assistant states that it does not store the audio data without the user's permission, but may store the conversation transcripts to personalise its experience. Personalisation can be turned off in settings. If a user wants Google Assistant to store audio data, they can go to Voice & Audio Activity (VAA) and turn on this feature. Audio files are sent to the cloud and used by Google to improve the performance of Google Assistant, but only if the VAA feature is turned on.

=== Amazon Alexa ===
The privacy policy of Amazon's virtual assistant, Alexa, states that it only listens to conversations when its wake word (like Alexa, Amazon, Echo) is used. It starts recording the conversation after the call of a wake word, and stops recording after 8 seconds of silence. It sends the recorded conversation to the cloud. It is possible to delete the recording from the cloud by visiting 'Alexa Privacy' in 'Alexa'.

=== Apple Siri ===
Apple states that it does not record audio to improve Siri. Instead, it claims to use transcripts. Transcript data is only sent if it is deemed important for analysis. Users can opt out anytime if they don't want Siri to send the transcripts in the cloud.

=== Microsoft Cortana ===
Cortana is a discontinued voice-only virtual assistant with singular authentication. This voice-activated device accessed user data to perform common tasks like checking weather or making calls, raising privacy concerns due to the lack of secondary authentication.

== Consumer interest ==
=== Presumed added value as allowing a new way of interactions ===
Added value of the virtual assistants can come among others from the following:

- Voice communication can sometimes represent the optimal man-machine communication:
1. It is convenient: there are some sectors where voice is the only way of possible communication, and more generally, it allows to free-up both hands and vision potentially for doing another activity in parallel, or helps also disabled people.
2. It is faster: Voice is more efficient than writing on a keyboard: we can speak up to 200 words per minute opposed to 60 in case of writing on a keyboard. It is also more natural thus requiring less effort (reading a text however can reach 700 words per minute).
- Virtual assistants save a lot of time by automation: they can take appointments, or read the news while the consumer does something else. It is also possible to ask the virtual assistant to schedule meetings, hence helping to organize time. The designers of new digital schedulers explained the ambition they had that these calendars schedule lives to make the consumer use his time more efficiently, through machine learning processes, and complete organization of work time and free time. As an example when the consumer expresses the desire of scheduling a break, the VA will schedule it at an optimal moment for this purpose (for example at a time of the week where they are less productive), with the additional long-term objective of being able to schedule and organize the free time of the consumer, to assure them optimal work efficiency.

=== Perceived interest ===
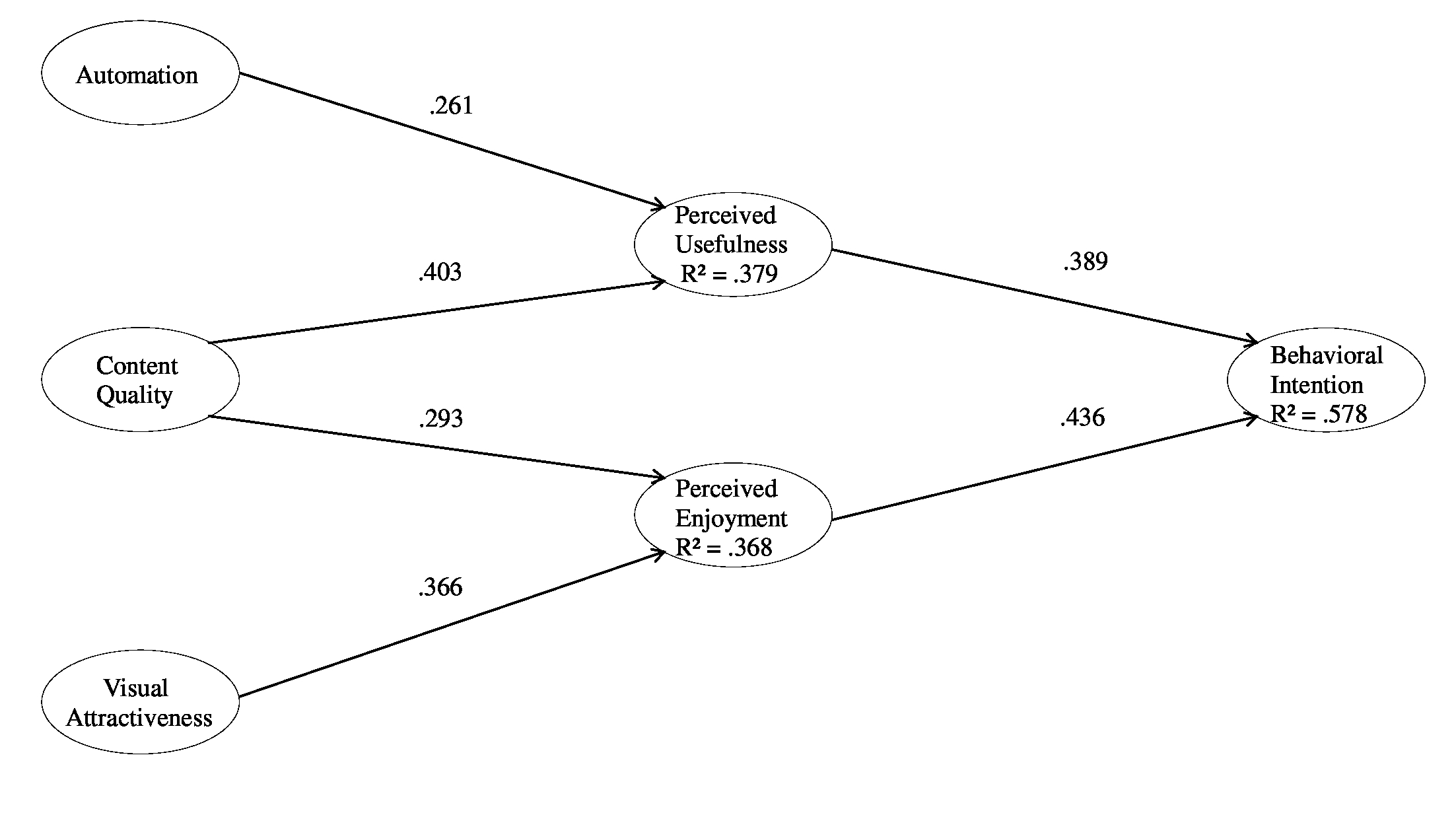
Graphical sum up of the study capturing reasons of interest of virtual assistants for consumers

- According to a recent study (2019), the two reasons for using virtual assistants for consumers are perceived usefulness and perceived enjoyment. The first result of this study is that both perceived usefulness and perceived enjoyment have an equivalent very strong influence for the consumer willingness to use a virtual assistant.
- The second result of this study is that:
1. Provided content quality has a very strong influence on perceived usefulness and a strong influence on perceived enjoyment.
2. Visual attractiveness has a very strong influence on perceived enjoyment.
3. Automation has a strong influence on perceived usefulness.

== Controversies ==
=== Artificial intelligence controversies ===
- Virtual assistants spur the filter bubble: As for social media, virtual assistants' algorithms are trained to show pertinent data and discard others based on previous activities of the consumer: The pertinent data is the one which will interest or please the consumer. As a result, they become isolated from data that disagrees with their viewpoints, effectively isolating them into their own intellectual bubble, and reinforcing their opinions. This phenomenon was known to reinforce fake news and echo chambers.
- Virtual assistants are also sometimes criticized for being overrated. In particular, A. Casilli points out that the AI of virtual assistants are neither intelligent nor artificial for two reasons:
1. Not intelligent because all they do is being the assistant of the human, and only by doing tasks that a human could do easily, and in a very limited specter of actions: find, class, and present information, offers or documents. Also, virtual assistants are neither able to make decisions on their own nor to anticipate things.
2. And not artificial because they would be impossible without human labelization through micro working.
- Virtual assistants also raise controversies about gender roles due to their typical default to feminine-sounding voices and personas. J. Lingel and K. Crawford argue that virtual assistants invoke the cultural figure of the secretary, embodying a supportive, capable, and feminized subordinate role. This design choice serves hierarchical power structures, reflecting whose interests are being prioritized. Historically, the secretarial role represented a terminal position for women, while men could leverage it for career advancement. This controversy is therefore connected to broader concerns about the devaluation of work when it is associated with feminine labour.

=== Ethical implications ===
In 2019 Antonio A. Casilli, a French sociologist, criticized artificial intelligence and virtual assistants in particular in the following way:

At a first level the fact that the consumer provides free data for the training and improvement of the virtual assistant, often without knowing it, is ethically disturbing.

But at a second level, it might be even more ethically disturbing to know how these AIs are trained with this data.

This artificial intelligence is trained via neural networks, which require a huge amount of labelled data. However, this data needs to be labelled through a human process, which explains the rise of microwork in the last decade. That is, remotely using some people worldwide doing some repetitive and very simple tasks for a few cents, such as listening to virtual assistant speech data, and writing down what was said. Microwork has been criticized for the job insecurity it causes, and for the total lack of regulation: The average salary was 1,38 dollar/hour in 2010, and it provides neither healthcare nor retirement benefits, sick pay, minimum wage. Hence, virtual assistants and their designers are controversial for spurring job insecurity, and the AIs they propose are still human in the way that they would be impossible without the microwork of millions of human workers.

Privacy concerns are raised by the fact that voice commands are available to the providers of virtual assistants in unencrypted form, and can thus be shared with third parties and be processed in an unauthorized or unexpected manner. Additionally to the linguistic content of recorded speech, a user's manner of expression and voice characteristics can implicitly contain information about their biometric identity, personality traits, body shape, physical and mental health condition, sex, gender, moods and emotions, socioeconomic status and geographical origin.

=== Feminization of Virtual Assistants ===
Most virtual assistants, such as Siri, Cortana, and Alexa, all feature feminine voices and personas by default, which draws attention to issues of the labour politics of secretarial work. The feminization of these VA voices brings up concerns regarding ingrained gender biases of women's work, and reinforces ideas of women's subservience as users interact with them. As a virtual secretary, these assistants are connected to the gendered stereotypes that the secretary is connected to tropes of feminine, supportive, non-threatening service work.

Scholars draw attention to the feminized voices of Virtual assistants, addressing gender-based issues in technology. This is an issue of interest as gender-biased technologies could intensify women’s objectification and gender stereotyping, as well as widen the gender gap. Further, there is the concern of enforcing sexist narratives, as the unconscious bias is manifested in children and adults that hard-wire women and commands.

=== Race and Gender Hierarchies ===
Multiple scholars have expressed concerns about programmed traits that signal racialized hierarchies within the invisible labor performed by virtual assistants. Researchers point to the colonial framework of creating virtual assistants, in which the erasure of race in AI presumes whiteness as the standard to model these assistants after.

Indicated through multiple categories, scholars indicate that racial ideology shapes virtual assistant portrayals of character. Categories include: beliefs aspect, deeper cognitive aspect, visual aspect, and feelings. Cues pointing towards whiteness involve language and accents employed by these assistants, setting a standardized demonstration of intelligence while dismissing other forms of language like African-American Vernacular English. Critics argue that prioritized is the white-middle class English and its widely-accepted stereotypical representation of professionalism; ignored is the cultural mannerisms and language practices of other racial groups.

Scholars suggest that cultural cues within AI must be challenged, as “race-blind” standardization of virtual assistant language implicitly omits diverse racial representation and establishes whiteness as the norm. Researchers suggest that race within technology can act as a vehicle to deploy social relation patterns and conceptions of how users organize themselves not only with technology, but also within the process of how racial stereotypes are reinforced.

Some scholars argue that women’s position in service work is reinforced by the feminized voices that are programmed into virtual assistants. Researchers indicate that feminized voices of virtual assistants like Siri and Alexa, have become normalized in what researchers label as “cultural common sense.” Feminized voices signal to many users an intimate bond that allows them to disclose information with their virtual assistants. However, this also raises scholarly concern about gender hierarchies being reinforced through inappropriate, sexual comments made by users. Virtual assistants respond to such comments by evading and politely redirecting their user. This process models the normalization of sexual objectification of women.

Stereotypes involving intersections of gender and race contribute to the models in which virtual assistants are programmed, as studies indicate that women of color are overrepresented in occupations that involve clerical duties and emotional labor.

Home devices like Amazon Echo, create sound environments with white feminine voices to which researchers point out the distortion of domestic labor realities, as women of color are predominantly represented in exploited employment situations. Scholars suggest that domestic servitude has become reconfigured by technology, reframing and reproducing gender and racial stereotypes with virtual assistants.

== Developer platforms ==
Notable developer platforms for virtual assistants include:

- Amazon Lex was opened to developers in April 2017. It involves natural language understanding technology combined with automatic speech recognition and had been introduced in November 2016.
- Google provides the Actions on Google and Dialogflow platforms for developers to create "Actions" for Google Assistant
- Apple provides SiriKit for developers to create extensions for Siri
- IBM's Watson, while sometimes spoken of as a virtual assistant is in fact an entire artificial intelligence platform and community powering some virtual assistants, chatbots. and many other types of solutions.

=== Previous generations ===
In previous generations of text chat-based virtual assistants, the assistant was often represented by an avatar (a.k.a. interactive online character or automated character) — this was known as an embodied agent.

== Economic relevance ==
=== For individuals ===
Digital experiences enabled by virtual assistants are considered to be among the major recent technological advances and most promising consumer trends. Experts claim that digital experiences will achieve a status-weight comparable to 'real' experiences, if not become more sought-after and prized. The trend is verified by a high number of frequent users and the substantial growth of worldwide user numbers of virtual digital assistants. In mid-2017, the number of frequent users of digital virtual assistants is estimated to be around 1 bn worldwide. In addition, it can be observed that virtual digital assistant technology is no longer restricted to smartphone applications, but present across many industry sectors (incl. automotive, telecommunications, retail, healthcare and education). In response to the significant R&D expenses of firms across all sectors and an increasing implementation of mobile devices, the market for speech recognition technology is predicted to grow at a CAGR of 34.9% globally over the period of 2016 to 2024 and thereby surpass a global market size of US$7.5 billion by 2024. According to an Ovum study, the "native digital assistant installed base" is projected to exceed the world's population by 2021, with 7.5 billion active voice AI–capable devices. According to Ovum, by that time "Google Assistant will dominate the voice AI–capable device market with 23.3% market share, followed by Samsung's Bixby (14.5%), Apple's Siri (13.1%), Amazon's Alexa (3.9%), and Microsoft's Cortana (2.3%)."

Taking into consideration the regional distribution of market leaders, North American companies (e.g. Nuance Communications, IBM, eGain) are expected to dominate the industry over the next years, due to the significant impact of BYOD (Bring Your Own Device) and enterprise mobility business models. Furthermore, the increasing demand for smartphone-assisted platforms are expected to further boost the North American intelligent virtual assistant (IVA) industry growth. Despite its smaller size in comparison to the North American market, the intelligent virtual assistant industry from the Asia-Pacific region, with its main players located in India and China is predicted to grow at an annual growth rate of 40% (above global average) over the 2016–2024 period.

=== Economic opportunity for enterprises ===
Virtual assistants can also have economic utility for enterprises. For example, a virtual assistant can organize meetings, check inventories, and answer questions. Despite these benefits, many small businesses are unaware of the advantages that Internet of things (IoT) technologies can provide.

== Security ==
In May 2018, researchers from the University of California, Berkeley, published a paper that showed audio commands undetectable for the human ear could be directly embedded into music or spoken text, thereby manipulating virtual assistants into performing certain actions without the user taking note of it. The researchers made small changes to audio files, which cancelled out the sound patterns that speech recognition systems are meant to detect. These were replaced with sounds that would be interpreted differently by the system and command it to dial phone numbers, open websites or even transfer money. The possibility of this has been known since 2016, and affects devices from Apple, Amazon and Google.

In addition to unintentional actions and voice recording, another security and privacy risk associated with intelligent virtual assistants is malicious voice commands: An attacker who impersonates a user and issues malicious voice commands to, for example, unlock a smart door to gain unauthorized entry to a home or garage or order items online without the user's knowledge. Although some IVAs provide a voice-training feature to prevent such impersonation, it can be difficult for the system to distinguish between similar voices. Thus, a malicious person who is able to access an IVA-enabled device might be able to fool the system into thinking that they are the real owner and carry out criminal or mischievous acts.

== Comparison of notable assistants ==
Intelligent personal assistant	Developer	Free software	Free and open-source hardware	HDMI out	External I/O	IOT	Chromecast integration	Smart phone app	Always on	Unit to unit voice channel	Skill language
Alexa (a.k.a. Echo)	Amazon.com	No	No	No	No	Yes	No	Yes	Yes	?	JavaScript
Alice	Yandex	No	—N/a	—N/a	—N/a	Yes	No	Yes	Yes	—N/a	?
AliGenie	Alibaba Group	No	No	—N/a	—N/a	Yes	No	Yes	Yes	—N/a	?
Assistant	Speaktoit	No	—N/a	—N/a	—N/a	No	No	Yes	No	—N/a	?
Bixby	Samsung Electronics	No	—N/a	—N/a	—N/a	No	No	Yes	—N/a	—N/a	JavaScript
BlackBerry Assistant	BlackBerry Limited	No	—N/a	—N/a	—N/a	No	No	Yes	No	—N/a	?
Braina	Brainasoft	No	—N/a	—N/a	—N/a	No	No	Yes	No	—N/a	?
Clova	Naver Corporation	No	—N/a	—N/a	—N/a	Yes	No	Yes	Yes	—N/a	?
Cortana	Microsoft	No	—N/a	—N/a	—N/a	Yes	No	Yes	Yes	—N/a	?
Duer	Baidu										
Evi	Amazon.com and True Knowledge	No	—N/a	—N/a	—N/a	No	No	Yes	No	—N/a	?
Google Assistant	Google	No	—N/a	—N/a	—N/a	Yes	Yes	Yes	Yes	—N/a	C++
Google Now	Google	No	—N/a	—N/a	—N/a	Yes	Yes	Yes	Yes	—N/a	?
Mycroft	Mycroft AI	Yes	Yes	Yes	Yes	Yes	Yes	Yes	Yes	Yes	Python
SILVIA	Cognitive Code	No	—N/a	—N/a	—N/a	No	No	Yes	No	—N/a	?
Siri	Apple Inc.	No	No	—N/a	—N/a	Yes	No	Yes	Yes	—N/a	?
Viv	Samsung Electronics	No	—N/a	—N/a	—N/a	Yes	No	Yes	No	—N/a	?
Xiaowei	Tencent										?
Celia	Huawei	No	No	—N/a	—N/a	Yes	No	Yes	Yes	—N/a	?

== See also ==
- Applications of artificial intelligence
- Artificial conversational entity
- Artificial human companion
- Autonomous agent
- Computer facial animation
- Expert system
- Friendly artificial intelligence
- Home network
- Hybrid intelligent system
- Intelligent agent
- Interactions Corporation
- Knowledge Navigator
- Office Assistant
- Multi-agent system
- Simulation hypothesis
- Social bot
- Social data revolution
- Software bot
- Wizard (software)
