= Verbot =

Chatterbot program and AI SDK

The Verbot (short for Verbal-Robot) was a chatbot program and artificial intelligence software development kit (SDK) designed for Windows and web platforms.

== Early beginning ==
The origin of verbot traces back to Michael Mauldin's research during his time as a graduate student and post-doctoral fellow at Carnegie Mellon University. The creative foundation also stems from Peter Plantec's work in personality psychology and art direction.

=== Historic outline ===
In 1994, Michael Loren Mauldin, founder of Lycos, Inc., developed a prototype chatbot, Julia, which competed in the internationally known Turing test, for the coveted Loebner Prize. The Turing test matches computer scientist judges against machines to see if they can distinguish a computer from a real human. Julia was refined and developed, and in 1997, Dr. Mauldin and Peter Plantec, a clinical psychologist and animator, formed Virtual Personalities, Inc. (now Conversive, Inc.) in order to create a virtual human interface that would incorporate real-time animation as well as speech and natural language processing. The initial release, a stand-alone virtual person called Sylvie, was beta-tested to the public. This release was well received, and finally, after several versions, the production release (deemed version 3) of the Verbally Enhanced Software Robot, or Verbot, was deployed in fall 2000.

- The grandfather of all Verbots is Rog-O-Matic, which, although it could not talk, could and did explore a virtual world.
- Julia has been active on the internet in one form or another since 1989.
- A close cousin of Julia is Lycos, a robot that explores the World Wide Web and answers questions about it.
- Sylvie was the first Verbot with a face and a voice.
- Sylvie was the first Virtual Human with advanced, flexible interfacing capability.

=== Beginnings ===
The Virtual Personalities story goes back to 1978, where Mauldin was attending Rice University. Fascinated by the idea of ELIZA, he proceeded to write a program called "PET" for his 8 kilobyte Commodore PET Computer. PET included simple induction as a way to post new information, for example:

       Subject:                I like my friend
               (later)
       Subject:                I like food.
       PET:                    I have heard that food is your friend.

Meanwhile, Plantec was separately designing a personality for "Entity", a theoretical virtual human that would interact comfortably with humans without pretending to be one. At that time the technology was not advanced enough to realize Entity. Mauldin got so involved with this that he majored in Computer Science and minored in Linguistics.

=== Rogue ===
In the late seventies and early eighties, a popular computer game at universities was Rogue, an implementation of Dungeons and Dragons where the player would descend 26 levels in a randomly created dungeon, fighting monsters, gathering treasure, and searching for the elusive "Amulet of Yendor". Mauldin was one of four grad students who devoted a large amount of time to building a program called "Rog-O-Matic" capable of retrieving the amulet and emerging victorious from the dungeon.

=== TinyMUD ===
In 1989, when James Aspnes at Carnegie Mellon created the first TinyMUD (a descendant of MUD and AberMUD), Mauldin was one of the first to create a computer player that would explore the text-based world of TinyMUD. But his first robot, Gloria, gradually accreted more and more linguistic ability, to the point that it could pass the "unsuspecting" Turing test. In this version of the test, the human has no reason to suspect that one of the other occupants of the room is controlled by a computer, and so is more polite and asks fewer probing questions. The second generation of Mauldin's TinyMUD robots was Julia, created on Jan. 8, 1990. Julia slowly developed into a more and more capable conversational agent, and assumed useful duties in the TinyMUD world, including tour guide, information assistant, note-taker, and message-relayer. She could even play the card game hearts along with the other human players.

In 1991, Julia attended the first Loebner Prize contest in Boston, Massachusetts. Although she only finished third, she was ranked by one judge as more human than one of the human confederates, winning a coveted certificate of humanness in the world's first restricted Turing test.

Julia continued to log in to various TinyMUD's and TinyMucks for the next seven years, and chatted with hundreds of people a month over the internet.

=== Lycos ===
Julia's job was to explore a virtual world consisting of pages of textual descriptions, with links between them, and to construct an internal map of that world and answer questions about it (including path information such as the shortest route from one room to another, and matching information, such as which rooms contained a certain kind of object or textual description).

It was therefore only a very short cognitive leap from Julia to Lycos, another robotic agent that explores a virtual world made of hyperlinked pages of text, and which answers questions about those pages. Sylvie was born and her abilities were expanded greatly to include interfacing with computers and control systems via her serial ports.

=== Sylvie ===
Sylvie was the first intelligent animated virtual human. She was designed both as a conversation agent and as a virtual human interface that would form a bridge between the two. She became more popular as a conversation agent, but her designers believe she serves as a prototype for future virtual human interface design that will help us all cope with the increasing complexity of technology.

As an aside, Plantec noticed that a large number of Sylvies have been sold in Southeast Asia. Upon investigation, he found out that students had discovered a "test" mode that would allow them to type in English sentences that Sylvie would pronounce in her somewhat stylized English.

== Ownership ==
In 1997, Dr. Mauldin and Peter Plantec formed Virtual Personalities, Inc. to create Natural Language Processing solutions for companies. In 2001 Virtual Personalities, Inc. became Conversive, Inc. to reflect the focus on providing Customer Service and Marketing to the Enterprise Market. In late 2012 Avaya, Inc. acquired Conversive's assets including Verbots.

== Verbot versions ==
The Verbot 4 version was created and released in 2004. In 2005 Version 4.1 of the Verbot Software was released with many feature enhancements and bug fixes, including built-in support for embedding C# code in outputs and conditionals. In early 2006 Conversive launched Verbots Online allowing Verbot 4 users to upload their knowledge and show off their bots to the world. In 2009 Version 5 was released, completely free and fully featured. In early 2012 the last version of Verbot, 5.0.1.2, was released to the general public with support for Windows 7. Later in 2012 Verbots Online completely shut down.

== Verbots today ==
Verbots.com, its community of users, and its forums no longer exist, but the software and users can still be found. There has been no active development since the early 2012 release of Verbot 5.0.1.2.

== See also ==
- Turing test
- Loebner Prize
- Chatbot
