= Eugene Goostman =

Chatbot that arguably passed the Turing test

Eugene Goostman is a chatbot that some regard as having passed the Turing test, a test of a computer's ability to communicate indistinguishably from a human. Developed in Saint Petersburg in 2001 by a group of three programmers, the Russian-born Vladimir Veselov, Ukrainian-born Eugene Demchenko, and Russian-born Sergey Ulasen, Goostman is portrayed as a 13-year-old Ukrainian boy—characteristics that are intended to induce forgiveness in those with whom it interacts for its grammatical errors and lack of general knowledge.

The Goostman bot has competed in a number of Turing test contests since its creation, and finished second in the 2005 and 2008 Loebner Prize contest. In June 2012, at an event marking what would have been the 100th birthday of the test's author, Alan Turing, Goostman won a competition promoted as the largest-ever Turing test contest, in which it successfully convinced 29% of its judges that it was human.

On 7 June 2014, at a contest marking the 60th anniversary of Turing's death, 33% of the event's judges thought that Goostman was human; the event's organiser Kevin Warwick considered it to have passed Turing's test as a result, per Turing's prediction in his 1950 paper "Computing Machinery and Intelligence", that by the year 2000, machines would be capable of fooling 30% of human judges after five minutes of questioning. The validity and relevance of the announcement of Goostman's pass was questioned by critics, who noted the exaggeration of the achievement by Warwick, the bot's use of personality quirks and humour in an attempt to misdirect users from its non-human tendencies and lack of real intelligence, along with "passes" achieved by other chatbots at similar events.

== Personality ==
Eugene Goostman is portrayed as being a 13-year-old boy from Odesa, Ukraine, who has a pet guinea pig and a father who is a gynaecologist. Veselov stated that Goostman was designed to be a "character with a believable personality". The choice of age was intentional, as, in Veselov's opinion, a thirteen-year-old is "not too old to know everything and not too young to know nothing". Goostman's young age also induces people who "converse" with him to forgive minor grammatical errors in his responses. In 2014, work was made on improving the bot's "dialog controller", allowing Goostman to output more human-like dialogue.

A conversation between Scott Aaronson and Eugene Goostman ran as follows:

Scott: Which is bigger, a shoebox or Mount Everest?
Eugene: I can’t make a choice right now. I should think it out later. And I forgot to ask you where you are from…
Scott: How many legs does a camel have?
Eugene: Something between 2 and 4. Maybe, three? :-))) By the way, I still don’t know your specialty – or, possibly, I’ve missed it?
Scott: How many legs does a millipede have?
Eugene: Just two, but Chernobyl mutants may have up two five. I know you are supposed to trick me.
Scott: No, I need to know that you're not a chatbot. Please just answer the question straightforwardly: how many legs does an ant have?
Eugene: Something between 2 and 4. Maybe three? :-))) Oh, what a fruitful conversation ;-)

== Competitions ==
Eugene Goostman has competed in a number of Turing test competitions, including the Loebner Prize contest; it finished joint second in the Loebner test in 2001, and came second to Jabberwacky in 2005 and to Elbot in 2008. On 23 June 2012, Goostman won a Turing test competition at Bletchley Park in Milton Keynes, held to mark the centenary of its namesake, Alan Turing. The competition, which featured five bots, twenty-five hidden humans, and thirty judges, was considered to be the largest-ever Turing test contest by its organizers. After a series of five-minute-long text conversations, 29% of the judges were convinced that the bot was an actual human.

=== 2014 "pass" ===
On 7 June 2014, in a Turing test competition at the Royal Society, organised by Kevin Warwick of the University of Reading to mark the 60th anniversary of Turing's death, Goostman won after 33% of the judges were convinced that the bot was human. 30 judges took part in the event, which included Lord Sharkey, a sponsor of Turing's posthumous pardon, artificial intelligence Professor Aaron Sloman, Fellow of the Royal Society Mark Pagel and Red Dwarf actor Robert Llewellyn. Each judge partook in a textual conversation with each of the five bots; at the same time, they also conversed with a human. In all, a total of 300 conversations were conducted. In Warwick's view, this made Goostman the first machine to pass a Turing test. In a press release, he added that:

Some will claim that the Test has already been passed. The words Turing Test have been applied to similar competitions around the world. However this event involved more simultaneous comparison tests than ever before, was independently verified and, crucially, the conversations were unrestricted. A true Turing Test does not set the questions or topics prior to the conversations.

In his 1950 paper "Computing Machinery and Intelligence", Turing predicted that by the year 2000, computer programs would be sufficiently advanced that the average interrogator would, after five minutes of questioning, "not have more than 70 per cent chance" of correctly guessing whether they were speaking to a human or a machine. Although Turing phrased this as a prediction rather than a "threshold for intelligence", commentators believe that Warwick had chosen to interpret it as meaning that if 30% of interrogators were fooled, the software had "passed the Turing test".

==== Reactions ====
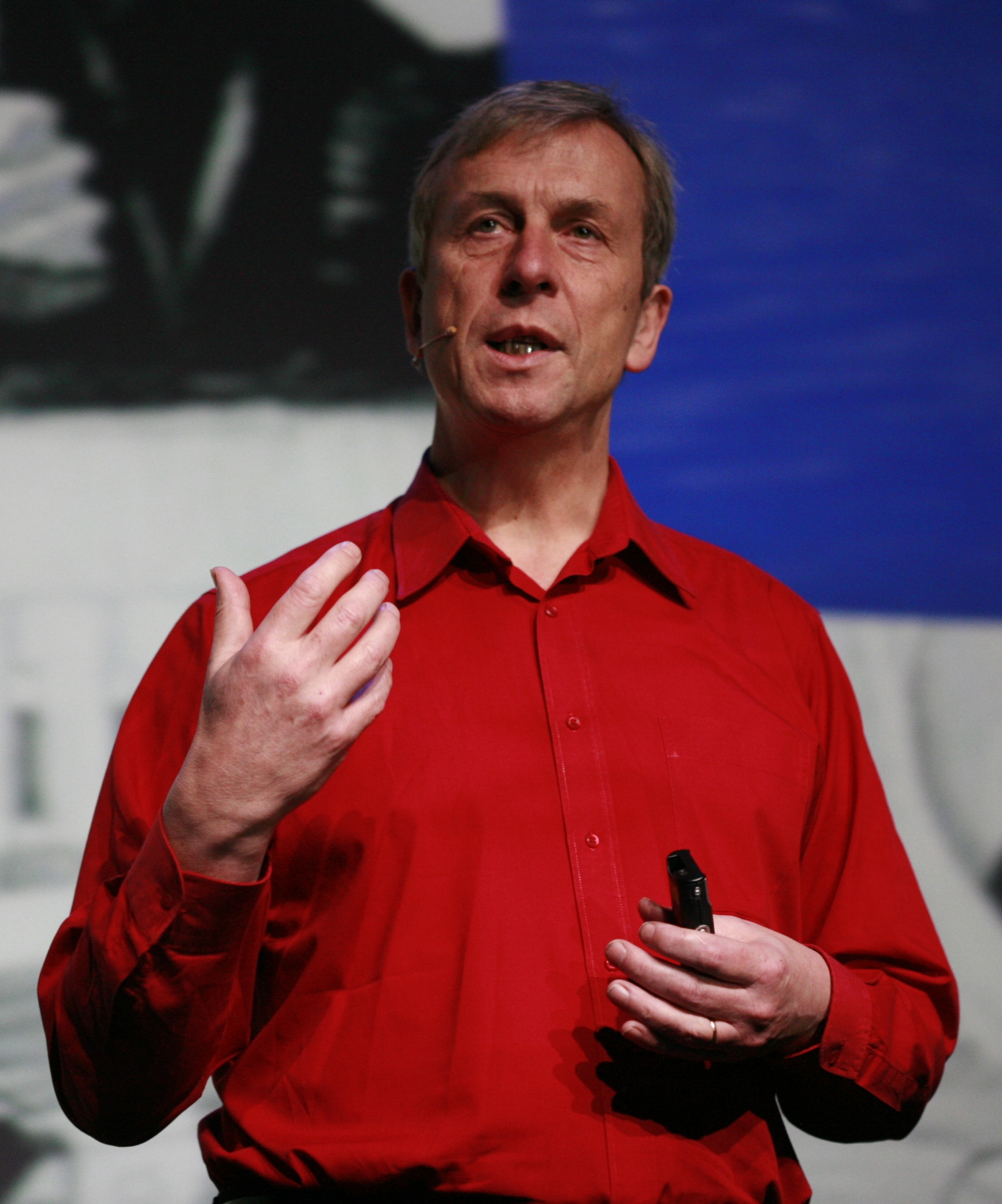
Kevin Warwick considered Goostman to be the first machine to "pass" a Turing test, although the validity of his claim was disputed by critics.

Warwick's claim that Eugene Goostman was the first ever chatbot to pass a Turing test was met with scepticism; critics acknowledged similar "passes" made in the past by other chatbots under the 30% criteria, including PC Therapist in 1991 (which tricked 5 of 10 judges, 50%), and at the Techniche festival in 2011, where a modified version of Cleverbot tricked 59.3% of 1334 votes (which included the 30 judges, along with an audience). Cleverbot's developer, Rollo Carpenter, argued that Turing tests can only prove that a machine can "imitate" intelligence rather than show actual intelligence.

Gary Marcus was critical of Warwick's claims, arguing that Goostman's "success" was only the result of a "cleverly-coded piece of software", going on to say that "it's easy to see how an untrained judge might mistake wit for reality, but once you have an understanding of how this sort of system works, the constant misdirection and deflection becomes obvious, even irritating. The illusion, in other words, is fleeting." While acknowledging IBM's Deep Blue and Watson projects—single-purpose computer systems meant for playing chess and the quiz show Jeopardy! respectively—as examples of computer systems that show a degree of intelligence in their specialised field, he further argued that they were not an equivalent to a computer system that shows "broad" intelligence, and could—for example, watch a television programme and answer questions on its content. Marcus stated that "no existing combination of hardware and software can learn completely new things at will the way a clever child can." However, he still believed that there were potential uses for technology such as that of Goostman, specifically suggesting the creation of "believable", interactive video game characters.

Imperial College London professor Murray Shanahan questioned the validity and scientific basis of the test, stating that it was "completely misplaced, and it devalues real AI research. It makes it seem like science fiction AI is nearly here, when in fact it's not and it's incredibly difficult."

Mike Masnick, editor of the blog Techdirt, was also skeptical, questioning publicity blunders such as the five chatbots being referred to in press releases as "supercomputers", and saying that "creating a chatbot that can fool humans is not really the same thing as creating artificial intelligence."

== See also ==
- Natural language processing
