= Hector Levesque =

Canadian academic and AI researcher

Hector Joseph Levesque
- Born: 1951 (age 74–75)
- Education: University of Toronto
- Known for: Winograd schema challenge
- Scientific career
- Fields: Natural language processing
- Institutions: University of Toronto
- Doctoral advisor: John Mylopoulos
- Doctoral students: Bart Selman
- Website: www.cs.toronto.edu/~hector/

Hector Joseph Levesque (born 1951) is a Canadian academic and researcher in artificial intelligence. His research concerns incorporating commonsense reasoning in intelligent systems and he initiated the Winograd Schemas Challenge.

== Education ==
He received his BSc, MSc and PhD from the University of Toronto in 1975, 1977, and 1981, respectively. His PhD advisor was John Mylopoulos. After graduation, he accepted a position at the Fairchild Laboratory for Artificial Intelligence Research in Palo Alto, and then joined the faculty at the University of Toronto where he has remained since 1984.

== Career ==
His research is in the area of knowledge representation and reasoning in artificial intelligence. On the representation side, he has worked on the formalization of a number of concepts pertaining to artificial and natural agents including belief, goals, intentions, ability, and the interaction between knowledge, perception and action. On the reasoning side, his research mainly concerns how automated reasoning can be kept computationally tractable, including the use of greedy local search methods.

Hector Levesque has published over 60 research papers, and is the co-author of several books. Four of these papers have won best paper awards of the American Association of Artificial Intelligence (AAAI) in 1984 (two), 1992, and 2006, and two other papers won similar awards at other conferences. In 2004, one of the 1984 papers was awarded the Classic Paper award of the AAAI, and the other was given an honourable mention. In 2006, a paper written in 1990 was given the inaugural Influential Paper Award by the International Foundation of Autonomous Agents and Multi-Agent Systems.

In 2011, Hector Levesque proposed a new way to test artificial intelligence called Winograd Schemas Challenge as a possible alternative of the Turing test during AAAI Spring Symposium. The idea was written in his article "The Winograd Schemas Challenge" along with collaborators Ernest Davis from New York University and Leora Morgenstern from SAIC.

== Honors and awards ==
Levesque was elected to the Executive Council of the AAAI, was a co-founder of the International Conference on Principles of Knowledge Representation and Reasoning, and is on the editorial board of five journals, including the journal Artificial Intelligence. In 2001, Levesque was the Conference Chair of the International Joint Conference on Artificial Intelligence (IJCAI), and served as President of the Board of Trustees of IJCAI from 2001 to 2003. In 1985, Levesque became the first non-American to receive the IJCAI Computers and Thought Award. He was the recipient of an E.W.R. Steacie Memorial Fellowship from the Natural Sciences and Engineering Research Council of Canada for 1990–91. He is a founding Fellow of the AAAI and was a Fellow of the Canadian Institute for Advanced Research from 1984 to 1995. In 2006, Levesque was elected to the Royal Society of Canada.

In 2013, Levesque received the IJCAI Award for Research Excellence; and in 2020, along with Moshe Vardi, he received the Alan Newell Award from the ACM and AAAI.

== Bibliography ==
- Brachman, Ronald J.; Levesque, Hector J. (1985). Readings in knowledge representation. Los Altos, California. ISBN 0-934613-01-X. OCLC 12286191.
- Levesque, Hector J.; Pirri, Fiora, eds. (1999). Logical foundations for cognitive agents : contributions in honor of Ray Reiter. Berlin: Springer. ISBN 3-540-66012-7. OCLC 41355639.
- Levesque, Hector J.; Lakemeyer, Gerhard (2000). The logic of knowledge bases. Cambridge, Massachusetts: MIT Press. ISBN 978-0-262-27823-2. OCLC 61725586.
- Brachman, Ronald J.; Levesque, Hector J. (2004). Knowledge representation and reasoning. Amsterdam. ISBN 978-0-08-048932-2. OCLC 147994324.
- Levesque, Hector J. (2012). Thinking as Computation : A First Course. Cambridge, MA, USA. ISBN 978-0-262-53474-1. OCLC 1015998837.
- Levesque, Hector J. (2017). Common sense, the Turing test, and the quest for real AI. Cambridge, Massachusetts. ISBN 978-0-262-53520-5. OCLC 960940230.
- Brachman, Ronald J.; Levesque, Hector J. (2022). Machines like us : toward AI with common sense. Cambridge, Massachusetts. ISBN 978-0-262-36923-7. OCLC 1268333687.

== See also ==
- Winograd schema challenge
