= Pirner =

Pirner is a German language habitational surname for someone from Pirna in Saxony or Birnau in Württemberg. Notable people with the name include:

- Dave Pirner (1964), American songwriter, singer, and producer
- Gitti Pirner (1943), German classical pianist
- Juergen Pirner (1956), German computer scientist
- Maximilian Pirner (1853–1924), Czech painter
