= SitePal =

- SitePal Screenshot
- Developer: Oddcast
- Operating system: cross platform
- Type: Website animated avatar
- License: commercial
- Website: SitePal.com

SitePal is a speaking avatar platform for small and medium-sized businesses developed by Oddcast.

SitePal allows users to deploy "virtual employees" on websites that can welcome visitors, guide them around the site and answer questions.

The use of SitePal on commercial websites has been controversial because many visitors report finding them annoying. Some research has shown that they can increase sales in comparison to using static photographs.

== Development ==
The technology used was the result of more than 4 years of research at Stanford University. The research was based on a literature review and other previous work in the field of artificial intelligence research.

The SitePal AI option uses the AIML programming language, which is partially editable by users. This allows web designers to simulate normal human conversation by using keywords or key phrases that the bot can respond to.

== Features ==
The company provides web designers with options to customize the chosen avatar. A large selection of faces, clothing, hair, backgrounds, voices and other details are available. If a web designer wants to use a particular face, Sitepal can create one from a photo. Thus, a mascot or a known face can be simulated.

== Speech ==
Sitepal avatars talk through text-to-speech (tts) software.

A short paragraph can be written (up to 900 characters) and the text-to-speech engine will compile the actual speech, which can be reproduced and edited. The tts engine is not perfect, but it comes close to actual speech and is easy to understand. Tts can be further enhanced by some commands, like /laugh and /loud which make the avatar laugh or talk loud. Even pronunciation is possible.

The web designer can record and upload his or her own audio messages. Alternatively Sitepal offers professional voice acting service at extra cost.

== User interaction ==
The company provides 5 options for visitor interaction:

- No interaction. The avatar simply says a pre-fixed message.
- FAQ mode. Questions can be configured, which are clickable and the user can hear the answer.
- Lead mode. The avatar prompts the user to type his email and short message, so it can be sent to the webmaster (usually used on a "contact us" page)
- Chatbot mode. The avatar greets the user, and he can type his questions and have a conversation with the bot. With predetermined replies, this can work as an FAQ as well.
- API customization. Experienced programmers can make their avatar interact with their website, making it talk when the user clicks on a link or when other triggers occur. Even dual avatar conversations can be created, like a talk show.

== Posting options ==
The company provides five options for posting the avatar:

- Embed in webpage (via javascript)
- Embed in HTML
- Send by email
- Publish to eBay
- Embed in Flash

== Criticism ==
Early reviews, such as one by Troy Dreier published in PC World in 2002 were positive and described SitePal as: "an engagingly simple and personal tool, and the price is reasonable for what it adds to a site". Although Dreier did note that the program had "bugs that suggested it hadn't been tested thoroughly".

In more recent years, reaction to SitePal has been much more negative with reviews such as Tom Spring writing in a PC World review citing SitePal ads and described his reaction as "Not so nice".

Paul Bissex, writing in E-Scribe News described SitePal as "heinous... and embarrassing if anyone is within earshot...they creep me out"

== Research on effectiveness ==
In one single-website research project Anita Campbell had half the visitors to Small Business Trends see a SitePal and the other half see just a static photograph. Over 11,000 visitors the SitePal avatar improved sign-up for a newsletter 144% over the control condition.
