= Winograd schema challenge =

Test of machine intelligence

The Winograd schema challenge (WSC) is a test of machine intelligence proposed in 2012 by Hector Levesque, a computer scientist at the University of Toronto. Designed to be an improvement on the Turing test, it is a multiple-choice test that employs Winograd schemas, questions of a very specific structure named after Terry Winograd, a professor of computer science at Stanford University.

On the surface, Winograd schema questions simply require the resolution of anaphora: the machine must identify the antecedent of an ambiguous pronoun in a statement. This makes it a task of natural language processing, but Levesque argues that for Winograd schemas, the task requires the use of knowledge and commonsense reasoning.

The challenge is considered "defeated" since 2019, when a number of transformer-based language models achieved accuracies of over 90%.

== History ==
The Winograd Schema Challenge was proposed in the spirit of the Turing test. Proposed by Alan Turing in 1950, the Turing test plays a central role in the philosophy of artificial intelligence. Turing proposed that, instead of debating whether a machine can think, the science of AI should be concerned with demonstrating intelligent behavior, which can be tested. But the exact nature of the test Turing proposed has come under scrutiny, especially since an AI chatbot named Eugene Goostman claimed to pass it in 2014. One of the major concerns with the Turing test is that a machine could easily pass the test with brute force and/or trickery, rather than true intelligence.

The Winograd schema challenge was proposed in 2012 in part to ameliorate the problems that came to light with the nature of the programs that performed well on the test.

Turing's original proposal was what he called the imitation game, which involves free-flowing, unrestricted conversations in English between human judges and computer programs over a text-only channel (such as teletype). In general, the machine passes the test if interrogators are not able to tell the difference between it and a human in a five-minute conversation.

Nuance Communications announced in July 2014 that it would sponsor an annual WSC competition, with a prize of $25,000 for the best system that could match human performance. However, the prize is no longer offered.

=== Weaknesses of the Turing test ===
The performance of Eugene Goostman exhibited some of the Turing test's problems. Levesque identifies several major issues, summarized as follows:

- Deception: The machine is forced to construct a false identity, which is not part of intelligence.
- Conversation: A lot of interaction may qualify as "legitimate conversation"—jokes, clever asides, points of order—without requiring intelligent reasoning.
- Evaluation: Humans make mistakes and judges often would disagree on the results.

== Winograd schemas ==
The key factor in the WSC is the special format of its questions, which are derived from Winograd schemas. Questions of this form may be tailored to require knowledge and commonsense reasoning in a variety of domains. They must also be carefully written not to betray their answers by selectional restrictions or statistical information about the words in the sentence.

=== Origin ===
The first cited example of a Winograd schema (and the reason for their name) is due to Terry Winograd:

The city councilmen refused the demonstrators a permit because they [feared/advocated] violence.

The choices of "feared" and "advocated" turn the schema into its two instances:

The city councilmen refused the demonstrators a permit because they feared violence.

The city councilmen refused the demonstrators a permit because they advocated violence.

The schema challenge question is, "Does the pronoun 'they' refer to the city councilmen or the demonstrators?" Switching between the two instances of the schema changes the answer. The answer is immediate for a human reader, but proves difficult to emulate in machines. Levesque argues that knowledge plays a central role in these problems: the answer to this schema has to do with our understanding of the typical relationships between and behavior of councilmen and demonstrators.

Since the original proposal of the Winograd schema challenge, Ernest Davis, a professor at New York University, has compiled a list of over 140 Winograd schemas from various sources as examples of the kinds of questions that should appear on the Winograd schema challenge.

=== Formal description ===
A Winograd schema challenge question consists of three parts:

1. A sentence or brief discourse that contains the following:
  - Two noun phrases of the same semantic class (male, female, inanimate, or group of objects or people),
  - An ambiguous pronoun that may refer to either of the above noun phrases, and
  - A special word and alternate word, such that if the special word is replaced with the alternate word, the natural resolution of the pronoun changes.
2. A question asking the identity of the ambiguous pronoun, and
3. Two answer choices corresponding to the noun phrases in question.

A machine will be given the problem in a standardized form which includes the answer choices, thus making it a binary decision problem.

=== Advantages ===
The Winograd schema challenge has the following purported advantages:

- Knowledge and commonsense reasoning are required to solve them.
- Winograd schemas of varying difficulty may be designed, involving anything from simple cause-and-effect relationships to complex narratives of events.
- They may be constructed to test reasoning ability in specific domains (e.g., social/psychological or spatial reasoning).
- There is no need for human judges.

=== Pitfalls ===
One difficulty with the Winograd schema challenge is the development of the questions. They need to be carefully tailored to ensure that they require commonsense reasoning to solve. For example, Levesque gives the following example of a so-called Winograd schema that is "too easy":

The women stopped taking pills because they were [pregnant/carcinogenic]. Which individuals were [pregnant/carcinogenic]?

The answer to this question can be determined on the basis of selectional restrictions: in any situation, pills do not get pregnant, women do; women cannot be carcinogenic, but pills can. Thus this answer could be derived without the use of reasoning, or any understanding of the sentences' meaning—all that is necessary is data on the selectional restrictions of pregnant and carcinogenic.

== Activity ==
In 2016 and 2018, Nuance Communications sponsored a competition, offering a grand prize of $25,000 for the top scorer above 90% (for comparison, humans correctly answer to 92–96% of WSC questions). However, nobody came close to winning the prize in 2016 and the 2018 competition was cancelled for lack of prospects; the prize is no longer offered.

The Twelfth International Symposium on the Logical Formalizations of Commonsense Reasoning was held on March 23–25, 2015 at the AAAI Spring Symposium Series at Stanford University, with a special focus on the Winograd schema challenge. The organizing committee included Leora Morgenstern (Leidos), Theodore Patkos (The Foundation for Research & Technology Hellas), and Robert Sloan (University of Illinois at Chicago).

The 2016 Winograd Schema Challenge was run on July 11, 2016 at IJCAI-16. There were four contestants. The first round of the contest was to solve PDPs—pronoun disambiguation problems, adapted from literary sources, not constructed as pairs of sentences. The highest score achieved was 58% correct, by Quan Liu et al, of the University of Science and Technology, China. Hence, by the rules of that challenge, no prizes were awarded, and the challenge did not proceed to the second round. The organizing committee in 2016 was Leora Morgenstern, Ernest Davis, and Charles Ortiz.

In 2017, a neural association model designed for commonsense knowledge acquisition achieved 70% accuracy on 70 manually selected problems from the original 273 Winograd schema dataset. In June 2018, a score of 63.7% accuracy was achieved on the full dataset using an ensemble of recurrent neural network language models, marking the first use of deep neural networks that learn from independent corpora to acquire common sense knowledge. In 2019 a score of 90.1%, was achieved on the original Winograd schema dataset by fine-tuning of the BERT language model with appropriate WSC-like training data to avoid having to learn commonsense reasoning. The general language model GPT-3 achieved a score of 88.3% without specific fine-tuning in 2020.

A more challenging, adversarial "Winogrande" dataset of 44,000 problems was designed in 2019. This dataset consists of fill-in-the-blank style sentences, as opposed to the pronoun format of previous datasets.

A version of the Winograd schema challenge is one part of the GLUE (General Language Understanding Evaluation) benchmark collection of challenges in automated natural-language understanding.
