= Jabberwacky =

Early chatbot

- Original author: Rollo Carpenter
- Release: 1997
- Successor: Cleverbot
- Type: Chatbot

Jabberwacky is a chatbot created by programmer Rollo Carpenter and launched in 1997. Its stated aim is to "simulate natural human chat in an interesting, entertaining (and humorous) manner". It is an early attempt at creating an artificially intelligent chatbot through human interaction.

== Purpose ==
The stated purpose of the project is to create an artificial intelligence that is capable of passing the Turing Test. It is designed to mimic human interaction and to carry out conversations with users.

Unlike more traditional AI programs, the learning technology is intended as a form of entertainment rather than being used for computer support systems or corporate representation. The Jabberwacky website also described a commercial set of scripting tools. These combined scripted conversation with the general learning AI for business uses that need more control over the conversation.

The ultimate intention is that the program move from a text based system to be wholly voice operated—learning directly from sound and other sensory inputs. Its creator believes that it can be incorporated into objects around the home such as robots or talking pets, intending both to be useful and entertaining, keeping people company.

== Cleverbot ==
Cleverbot is the evolved version of the older Jabberwacky chatterbot, or chatbot, originally launched in 1997 on the web.

== Timeline ==
- 1982 – The first incarnation of this project is created as a program hard-coded on a Sinclair ZX81.
- 1988 – Learning AI project founded as 'Thoughts'
- 1997 – Launched on the Internet as 'Jabberwacky'
- October 2003 – Jabberwacky shares third place in the Loebner Prize with Eugene Goostman. The prize is won by Juergen Pirner's Jabberwock, a German chat program. Elbot is second.
- September 2004 – Jabberwacky is awarded second place in the Loebner Prize. It was beaten by computer chat program A.L.I.C.E.
- September 2005 – George, a character within Jabberwacky, wins the Loebner Prize
- September 2006 – Joan, another Jabberwacky character, wins the Loebner Prize
- 2008 – The program is renamed Cleverbot

== See also ==
- Artificial Linguistic Internet Computer Entity (ALICE)
- Chatterbot
- Loebner Prize
