= Michael Mauldin =

Michael Mauldin may refer to:

- Michael Mauldin (record executive) (born 1953), former president of Columbia Records and father of Jermaine Dupri
- Michael Loren Mauldin (born 1959), founder of Lycos search engine
