= Michael Loren Mauldin =

American computer scientist (born 1959)

- Born: March 23, 1959 (age 67); Dallas, Texas, U.S.
- Education: Midland High School
- Alma mater: Rice University (BS); Carnegie Mellon University (MS, PhD)
- Title: Founder of Lycos
- Spouse: Debbie
- Scientific career
- Fields: Computer science
- Doctoral advisor: Jaime Carbonell

Michael Loren "Fuzzy" Mauldin (/ˈmɔːldən/; born March 23, 1959) is an American retired computer scientist and the creator of the Lycos web search engine.

He has written 2 books, 10 refereed papers, and several technical reports on natural-language processing, autonomous information agents, information retrieval, and expert systems. He is also one of the authors of Rog-O-Matic and Julia, a Turing test competitor in the Loebner Prize.

Verbot, a defunct chatbot program, is based on Mauldin's work.

Mauldin is an active competitor in the Robot Fighting League.

== Early life and education ==
Mauldin was born on March 23, 1959, in Dallas, Texas, to Jimmie Alton Mauldin and Marilyn Jean Taylor. In 1974 the family moved to Midland, Texas and Michael enrolled in Midland High School and graduated valedictorian in 1977. In 1981, he received a bachelor's degree from Rice University. In 1983, he received master's degree and in 1989, he received a Ph.D., both from Carnegie Mellon University (CMU). His Ph.D. advisor was Jaime Carbonell.

== Career ==
In 1994, while working at CMU on the Informedia Digital Library project, Mauldin created Lycos from 3 pages of code. Along with CMU, he sold 80% of the company to CMGI for $2 million.

In 1996, Lycos was the fastest company ever to become a public company via an initial public offering. Mauldin sold his stake in Lycos during the dot-com bubble and retired.

In 1997, he left Lycos to form Conversive with Peter Plantec. The company was an artificial intelligence software company that created self-animated computer-generated human characters. He remained on the board of directors of the company until 2013, when it was acquired by Avaya.

In 2000, after watching BattleBots, Mauldin built a robot and became a successful competitor in robot combat.

In August 2015, he became a member of the board of directors of Lycos, now owned by Suresh Reddy.

In 2017, he appeared on Robot Wars as the team captain for the "rest of the world" team.

=== Patents ===
Mauldin is the inventor or co-inventor of the following 4 patents:

- US 5,748,954 - "Method for searching a queued and ranked constructed catalog of files stored on a network"
- US 5,835,667 - "Method and apparatus for creating a searchable digital video library and a system and method of using such a library"
- US 5,664,227 - "System and method for skimming digital audio/video data"
- US 7,253,817 - "Virtual human interface for conducting surveys"

== Personal life ==
Mauldin is married to Debbie and they have grown children. In addition to robot combat, they enjoy traveling via recreational vehicle and driving his Jeep Wrangler Sahara through the desert. They owned an 81-acre ranch near Austin, Texas. He is also an active bowler with a Brunswick Pearl engraved with his name "Fuzzy". Mauldin was recruited by Google but opted to stay retired.
