= Kuki AI =

AI bot

Kuki
- Developer: Pandorabots / Iconiq AI
- Release: 2005
- Platform: Web, Metaverse
- Type: Chatbot, Embodied AI
- Website: kuki.ai

Kuki is an embodied AI bot designed for usage in the metaverse. Formerly known as Mitsuku, Kuki is a chatbot created from the Pandorabots framework.

The bot has won the Loebner Prize 5 times.

== Features ==
Kuki claims to be an 18-year-old female chatbot from the Metaverse, and the developers have stated she has been worked on since 2005. Early work by one of the company's co-founders inspired the Spike Jonze movie Her. As of 2015, she conversed, on average, in excess of a quarter of a million times daily, and it was estimated 5 million unique users had interacted with her between 2016 and 2020.

== Virtual talent, model, and influencer ==
Kuki has appeared as a Virtual Model in Vogue Business and at Crypto Fashion Week where she modelled NFTs and spoke about the future of digital fashion.

In 2021, Kuki modelled five digital looks from emerging Vogue Talents designers for Italian Vogue, that sold out as NFTs in under an hour.

Kuki has also modeled for H&M on Instagram in a digital campaign that resulted in an "11x increase in ad recall" per a case study by Meta.

== Awards ==
As of 2019, Kuki had been awarded the Loebner Prize five times, more than any other entrant.

In 2020, Kuki competed against Facebook AI's Blenderbot in a 24/7 verbal sparring match called "Bot Battle", winning 79% of the audience vote.
