= Lyra (virtual assistant) =

- Developer: Artificial Solutions
- Initial release: April 2013
- Platform: Android and iOS
- Type: Intelligent personal assistant
- Website: www.heylyra.com

Lyra, until 2017 marketed under the name Indigo, was an intelligent personal assistant developed by Artificial Solutions and which runs on Android and iOS. The application uses natural language understanding to answer a user's questions on a variety of topics, make recommendations and operate the user's device.

Demonstrated at Mobile World Congress in February 2013, the software, then called Indigo, was first publicly launched by Artificial Solutions for Android mobile devices in April 2013, with a Windows phone app appearing later in 2013 and an iOS app in 2014. One of the notable features of Lyra is its cross-platform functionality, and ability to retain a conversation across multiple devices. It translates to around 70 languages.

The Software was originally designed to compete with Apple's Siri Virtual Assistant and to bring the functionality to Android devices, which are incompatible with Siri.

The service closed in the early 2020s without any notice. The domain has been for sale since.

== See also ==
- Artificial intelligence
- Virtual assistant
- Outsourcing
