= Hugh Loebner =

American activist (1942–2016)

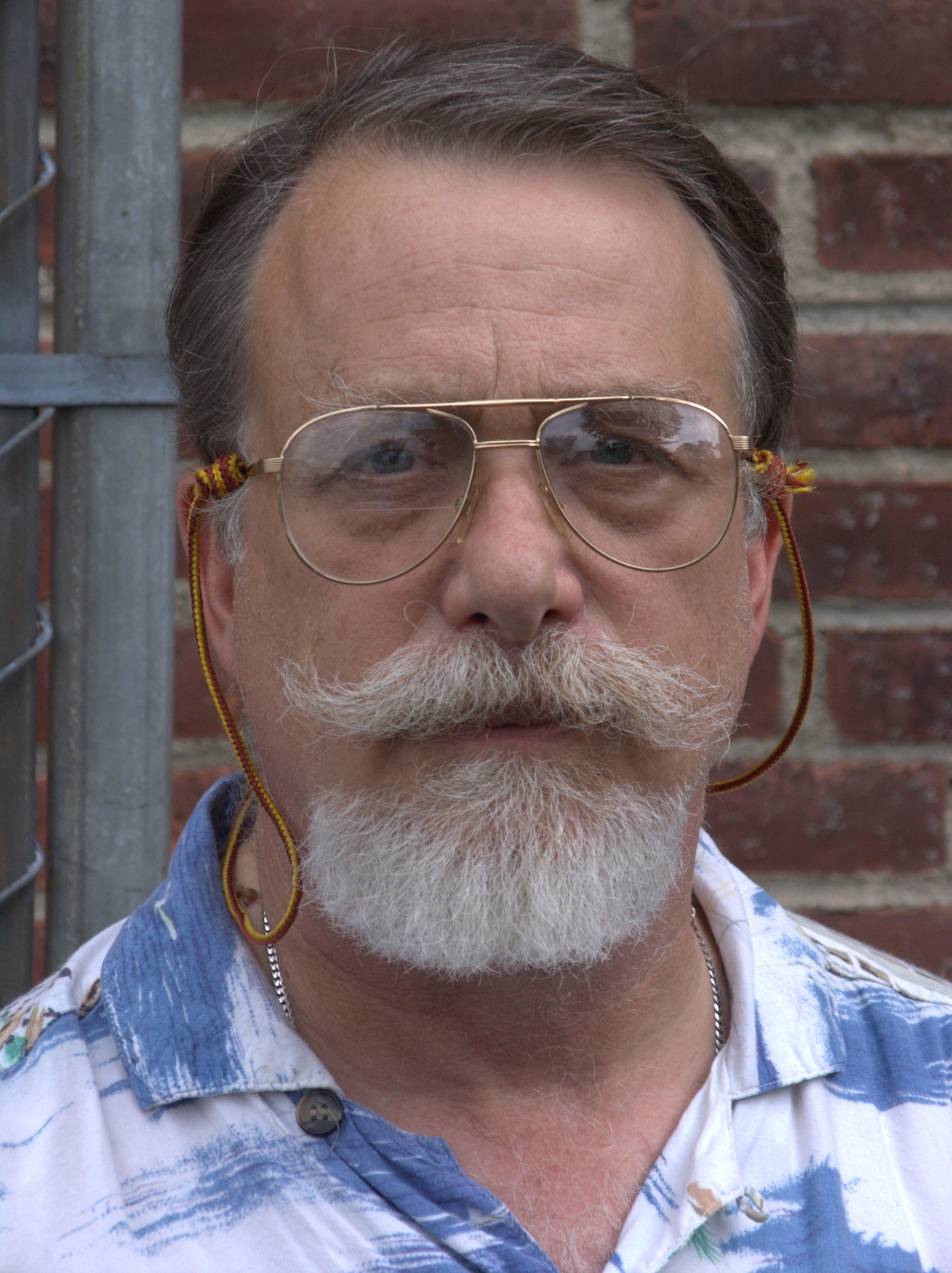
Loebner in 2004

Hugh Gene Loebner (March 26, 1942 – December 4, 2016) was an American inventor and social activist, who was notable for sponsoring the Loebner Prize, an embodiment of the Turing test. Loebner held six United States Patents, and he was also an outspoken advocate for the decriminalization of prostitution.

== Loebner prize ==
Loebner established the Loebner Prize in 1990. He pledged to give $100,000 and a solid gold medal to the first programmer able to write a program whose communicative behavior can fool humans into thinking that the program is human. The competition has been repeated annually and has been hosted by various organizations. Within the field of artificial intelligence, the Loebner Prize is somewhat controversial; the most prominent critic, Marvin Minsky, has called it a publicity stunt that does not help the field along.

Loebner also liked to point out that, unlike the solid gold medal for the Loebner prize, the gold medals of the Olympic Games are not solid gold, but are made of silver covered with a thin layer of gold.

Fascinated by Alan Turing's imitation game, and considering creating a system himself to pass it, Loebner realized that even if he were to succeed in developing a computer that could pass the Turing test, no avenue existed in which to prove it.

In his letter to Dr. Robert Epstein, written on December 30, 1988, Loebner authorized Dr. Epstein to move forward with a contest, and referring to the Turing Test, Loebner wrote: "Robert, in years to come, there may be richer prizes, and more prestigious contests, but gads, this will always be the oldest." Establishing the Loebner Prize, he introduced the Turing Test to a wider public, and he stimulated interest in this science. It remains Hugh Loebner’s desire to advance AI, and for the Turing Test to serve as a tool to measure the state of the art: "There is a nobility in this endeavour. If we humans can succeed in developing an artificial intellect it will be a measure of the scope of our intellect" (from: In Response, 1994).

== Prostitution ==
Loebner was open about his visits to prostitutes. In 1994, after a campaign by officials in New York City to arrest customers of prostitutes, he wrote an opposing letter to The New York Times, which was published. In 1996, he authored a Magna Carta for Sex Work or Manifesto of Sexual Freedom, in which he denounced the criminalization of consensual sexual acts, and asked all like-minded people to join a protest on June 9, 1996 (a play on the 69 sex position). In interviews, he stated that he believed himself to be too old for the young attractive women he is interested in; they would not have sex with him were it not for the money. He has compared the oppression of prostitutes and their customers to the oppression that Alan Turing faced because of his homosexual behavior.

== Personal life ==
Loebner held a Ph.D. in demography from the University of Massachusetts Amherst, Amherst. He was divorced, lived in New York City, and owned Crown Industries, a manufacturer of crowd control stanchion and brass fittings, which is the major sponsor of the Loebner Prize in the US.

== Death ==
On December 4, 2016, Hugh's ex-wife, Elaine Loebner, announced on Twitter that Hugh had "died peacefully in his sleep". He was 74 years old.
