= Cleverbot =

Chatbot web application

- Website type: Chatbot
- Available in: English
- Owner: Existor
- Creator: Rollo Carpenter
- Website: www.cleverbot.com
- Registration: Optional
- Launched: 2008; 18 years ago
- Current status: Active

Cleverbot is a chatterbot web application. It was created by British AI scientist Rollo Carpenter and launched in October 2008. It was preceded by Jabberwacky, a chatbot project that began in 1988 and went online in 1997. In its first decade, Cleverbot held several thousand conversations with Carpenter and his associates. Since launching on the web, the number of conversations held has exceeded 150 million. Besides the web application, Cleverbot is also available as an iOS, Android, and Windows Phone app.

== Operation ==
Cleverbot's responses are not pre-programmed because it learns from human input: Humans type into the box below the Cleverbot logo and the system finds all keywords or an exact phrase matching the input. After searching through its saved conversations, it responds to the input by finding how a human responded to that input when it was asked, in part or in full, by Cleverbot.

Cleverbot participated in a formal Turing test at the 2011 Techniche festival at the Indian Institute of Technology Guwahati on 3 September 2011. Out of the 1334 votes cast, Cleverbot was judged to be 59.3% human, compared to the rating of 63.3% human achieved by human participants. A score of 50.05% or higher is often considered to be a passing grade. The software running for the event had to handle just 1 or 2 simultaneous requests, whereas online Cleverbot is usually talking to around 10,000 to 50,000 people at once.

== Developments ==
Cleverbot is constantly growing in data size at the rate of 4 to 7 million interactions per day. Updates to the software have been mostly behind the scenes. In 2014, Cleverbot was upgraded to use GPU serving techniques. Unlike Eliza, the program does not respond in a fixed way, instead choosing its responses heuristically using fuzzy logic, the whole of the conversation being compared to the millions that have taken place before. Cleverbot now uses over 279 million interactions, about 3-4% of the data it has already accumulated. The developers of Cleverbot are attempting to build a new version using machine learning techniques.

An app that uses the Cleverscript engine to play a game of 20 Questions has been launched under the name Clevernator. Unlike other such games, the player asks the questions and it is the role of the AI to understand, and answer factually. An app that allows owners to create and talk to their own small Cleverbot-like AI has been launched, called Cleverme! for Apple products.

== In popular culture ==
Cleverbot received media attention after being featured in the popular 2010 creepypasta ARG web serial Ben Drowned by Alexander D. Hall.

In early 2017, a Twitch stream of two Google Home devices modified to talk to each other using Cleverbot garnered over 700,000 visitors and over 30,000 peak concurrent viewers.

== See also ==
- Siri
- Cortana
- Google Assistant
- ChatGPT
- Character.AI
