= Richard Wallace (scientist) =

American computer programmer

- Born: 1960 (age 65–66); Portland, Maine, US
- Education: Carnegie Mellon University
- Known for: AIML, A.L.I.C.E.
- Scientific career
- Fields: Artificial Intelligence
- Thesis: (1989)

Richard S. Wallace is an American author of AIML and Botmaster of A.L.I.C.E. (Artificial Linguistic Internet Computer Entity). He is also the founder of the A.L.I.C.E Artificial Intelligence Foundation. Dr. Wallace's work has appeared in the New York Times, WIRED, CNN, ZDTV and in numerous foreign language publications across Asia, Latin America and Europe.

Wallace began work on A.L.I.C.E. in 1995, and the project has gained contributions from over 500 developers from around the world. A.L.I.C.E. won the Loebner Prize in 2000, 2001, and 2004. In 2002, Wallace began a collaboration with Franz, Inc. which resulted in Pandorabots, an AIML server and interpreter implemented in Common Lisp. Wallace then became the Chief Science Officer of Pandorabots, Inc.

Richard Wallace was born in Portland, Maine in 1960. He earned his Ph.D. in computer science from Carnegie Mellon University in 1989.
