= Rollo Carpenter =

British artificial intelligence researcher

- Born: 1965 (age 60–61)
- Citizenship: British
- Occupations: Computer scientist, programmer
- Known for: Artificial intelligence development
- Notable work: Jabberwacky; Cleverbot
- Family: Merlin Carpenter
- Awards: British Computer Society's Machine Intelligence Competition (2010)

Rollo Carpenter (born 1965) is the British-born creator of Jabberwacky and Cleverbot, learning artificial intelligence (AI) software. Carpenter worked as CTO of a business software startup in Silicon Valley.

== Cleverbot ==
In 2011, Cleverbot, a learning AI conversationalist, took part alongside humans in a formal Turing test at the Techniche 2011 festival at IIT Guwahati, India, on 3 September. The results from 1,334 votes were announced 4 September 2011. Cleverbot was judged to be 59.3% human, far exceeding expectations. The humans in the event achieved just 63.3%.
