= Juergen Pirner =

Juergen Pirner (born 1956) is the German creator of Jabberwock, a chatterbot that won the 2003 Loebner prize.

Pirner created Jabberwock modelling the Jabberwocky from Lewis Carroll's poem of the same name. Initially, Jabberwock would just give rude or fantasy-related answers; but over the years, Pirner has programmed better responses into it. As of 2007 he has taught it 2.7 million responses.

Pirner lives in Hamburg, Germany.
