= Rog-O-Matic =

Rog-O-Matic is a bot developed in 1981 to play and win the video game Rogue, by four graduate students in the Computer Science Department at Carnegie-Mellon University in Pittsburgh: Andrew Appel, Leonard Hamey, Guy Jacobson and Michael Loren Mauldin.

Described as a "belligerent expert system", Rog-O-Matic performs well when tested against expert Rogue players, even winning the game.

In a test during a three-week period in 1983, Rog-O-Matic had a higher median score than any of the 15 top Rogue players at the Carnegie-Mellon University and, at the University of Texas at Austin, found the Amulet of Yendor in a passageway on the 26th level, continued on to the surface and emerged into the light of day.

Because all information in Rogue is communicated to the player via ASCII text, Rog-O-Matic has automatic access to the same information a human player has. The program is still the subject of some scholarly interest; a 2005 paper said:

Rog-O-Matic differs from traditional expert systems in that it has the ability to work within a dynamic environment, for example the randomly generated terrain and adversaries. More importantly, the system was designed to operate in spite of limited information, recording and integrating knowledge about the environment as it is discovered.
