= 1954 in science =

The year 1954 in science and technology involved some significant events, listed below.

== Astronomy ==
- November 30 – In Sylacauga, Alabama, an 8.5 pound sulfide meteorite crashes through a roof and hits Mrs. Elizabeth Hodges in her living room after bouncing off her radio, giving her a bad bruise; the first known modern case of a human being hit by a space rock.

== Biology ==
- January 10 – Last confirmed specimen of a Caspian tiger is killed, in the valley of the Sumbar River in the Kopet Dag Mountains of Turkmenistan.
- Daniel I. Arnon demonstrates in the laboratory the chemical function of photosynthesis in chloroplasts.
- Heinz Sielmann makes the pioneering nature documentary about woodpeckers, Zimmerleute des Waldes ("Carpenters of the forest").
- Eduard Paul Tratz and Heinz Heck propose the species name bonobo for what was previously known as the pygmy chimpanzee.

== Chemistry ==
- September – The Wittig reaction is reported by German chemist Georg Wittig.
- December – Publication of the first analysis of the three-dimensional molecular structure of vitamin B_{12} by a group including Dorothy Hodgkin, and utilising computer analysis provided by Kenneth Nyitray Trueblood.
- Strychnine total synthesis is first achieved in the laboratory by Robert Burns Woodward's team at Harvard.

== Computer science ==
- January – The TRADIC Phase One computer is completed at Bell Labs in the United States, a candidate to be regarded as the first transistor computer.
- January 7 – Georgetown–IBM experiment: the first public demonstration of a machine translation system held in New York at the head office of IBM.

== Geology ==
- December 31 – The first specimens of the mineral benstonite are collected by Orlando J. Benston in the Magnet Cove igneous complex of Arkansas.

== History of science ==
- Joseph Needham begins publication of Science and Civilisation in China (Cambridge University Press).
- A History of Technology, edited by Charles Singer, E. J. Holmyard and A. R. Hall, begins publication (Oxford University Press).

== Mathematics ==
- January 6 – The Luhn algorithm, devised by IBM information scientist Hans Peter Luhn, is described in a United States patent.
- Klaus Roth publishes a paper laying the foundations for modern discrepancy theory.
- Leonard Jimmie Savage publishes Foundations of Statistics, promoting Bayesian statistics.

== Medicine ==
- February 23 – The first mass vaccination of children against polio begins, in Pittsburgh, Pennsylvania.
- August 10 – British epidemiologist Richard Doll submits a study on the risk to workers in asbestos manufacture of mortality from lung cancer.
- The first organ transplants are done in Boston and Paris.
  - December 23 – Joseph Murray at Peter Bent Brigham Hospital in Boston carries out the first successful kidney transplant, between identical twins.
- The first of the anti-psychotic phenothiazine drugs, Chlorpromazine, starts being sold under the trade names Thorazine (U.S.) and Largactil (U.K.)
- The sucrose gap is introduced by Robert Stämpfli for the reliable measurement of action potential in nerve fibers.

== Metrology ==
- 10th General Conference on Weights and Measures proposes the six original SI base units.
- Alexander Macmillan publishes the "Macmillan correction" to account for errors in the calculation of velocity of an object moving along a gradient due to viscous effects and wall proximity.

== Physics ==
- January 2 – Harold Hopkins and Narinder Singh Kapany at Imperial College London report achieving low-loss light transmission through a 75 cm long optical fiber bundle.
- March 1 – Castle Bravo: United States carries out a thermonuclear weapon test on Bikini Atoll in the Pacific Ocean.
- September 29 – CERN is founded by twelve European states.
- First tokamak built, in the Soviet Union.

== Psychology ==
- Summer – Robbers Cave Experiment carried out by Muzafer and Carolyn Sherif.
- Man Meets Dog is published by Konrad Lorenz.

== Technology ==
- June 26 – Obninsk Nuclear Power Plant, the first civilian nuclear power station, is commissioned in the Soviet Union.
- June 29 – Buckminster Fuller is granted a United States patent for his development of the geodesic dome.
- September 30 – The submarine USS Nautilus (SSN-571), the first atomic-powered vessel, is commissioned by the United States Navy.
- October 18 – Texas Instruments announces development of the first commercial transistor radio, the Regency TR-1, manufactured in Indianapolis; it goes on sale the following month.
- December 16 – The first synthetic diamond is produced.
- New Zealand engineer Sir William Hamilton develops the first pump-jet engine (the "Hamilton Jet") capable of propelling a jetboat.
- The first electric drip brew coffeemaker is patented in Germany and named the Wigomat after its inventor Gottlob Widmann.
- Staley T. McBrayer invents the Vanguard web offset press for newspaper printing in Fort Worth, Texas.
- The angle grinder is invented by German company Ackermann + Schmitt (Flex-Elektrowerkzeuge).

== Awards ==
- Fields Prize in Mathematics: Kunihiko Kodaira and Jean-Pierre Serre, the latter being the youngest-ever winner, at age 27
- Nobel Prizes
  - Physics – Max Born and Walther Bothe
  - Chemistry – Linus Pauling
  - Medicine – John Franklin Enders, Thomas Huckle Weller and Frederick Chapman Robbins

== Births ==
- January 16 – Morten P. Meldal, Danish Nobel Prize in Chemistry laureate, 2022.
- February 9 – Kevin Warwick, English scientist, author of March of the Machines.
- March – Clare Marx, English surgeon.
- May 14 – Peter J. Ratcliffe, English cellular biologist, Nobel Prize in Physiology or Medicine laureate, 2019.
- June 20
  - Ilan Ramon (died 2003), Israeli astronaut.
  - Huda Zoghbi, Lebanese-born geneticist.
- July 11 – Julia King, English materials engineer.
- July 17 – Angela Kasner, German physical chemist and Chancellor.
- July 28 – Gerd Faltings, German mathematician.
- August 28 – George M. Church, American geneticist, molecular engineer and chemist.
- September 5 – Yu Myeong-Hee, South Korean microbiologist.
- November 1 – Graham Colditz, Australian-born epidemiologist.
- November 7 – Vijay Kumar, Indian molecular biologist.
- December 11 – Peter Hegemann, German biophysicist, Nobel Prize in Physiology or Medicine laureate, 2026.
- December 29 – Albrecht Böttcher, German mathematician.
- George McGavin, Scottish entomologist.

== Deaths ==
- January 17 – Leonard Eugene Dickson (born 1874), American mathematician.
- March 7
  - Otto Diels (born 1876), German Nobel Chemistry laureate, 1950.
  - Ludwik Hirszfeld (born 1884), Polish microbiologist and serologist.
- April 10 – Auguste Lumière (born 1862), French inventor, film pioneer.
- April 21 – Emil Post (born 1897), American mathematician and logician.
- June 7 – Alan Turing (born 1912), English mathematician and computer scientist (probable suicide).
- July 11 – Henry Valentine Knaggs (born 1859), English practitioner of naturopathic medicine.
- October 3 – Vera Gaze (born 1899), Soviet Russian astronomer.
- October 8 – Dimitrie Pompeiu (born 1873), Romanian mathematician.
- November 29 – Enrico Fermi (born 1901), Italian American physicist.
