= Stéphanie P. Lacour =

French neurotechnologist

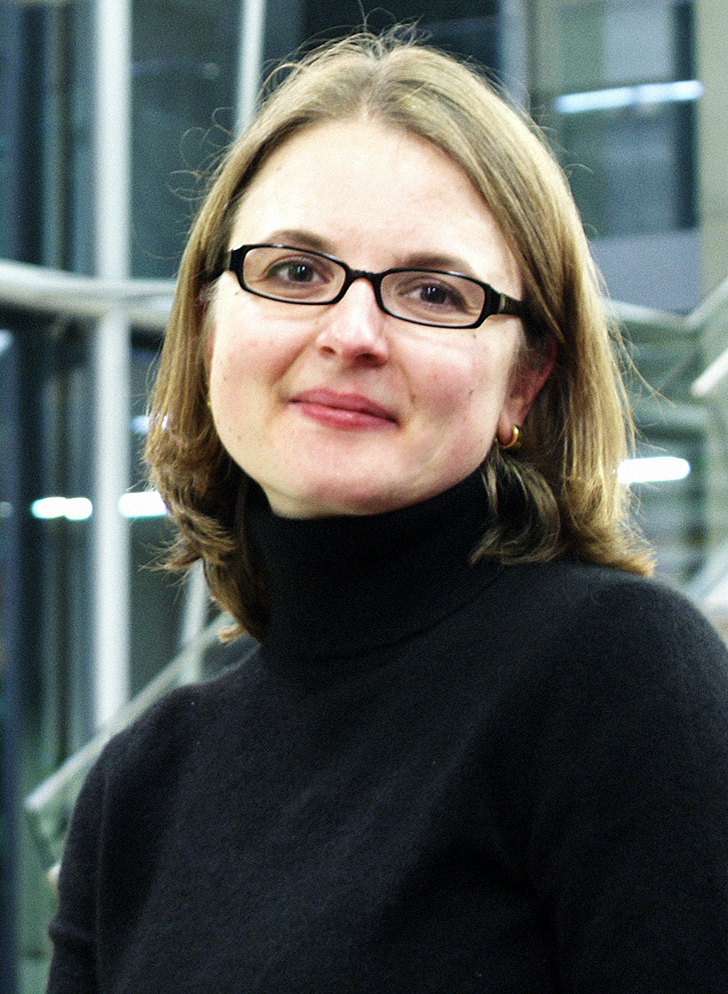
- Lacour in 2010
- Born: c. 1975; France
- Education: INSA Lyon (M.Sc. and Ph.D.)
- Known for: Developing biocompatible soft, flexible electronic interfaces
- Awards: 2015 Young Global Leader YGL World Economic Forum, 2006 MIT Technology Review Youn Innovator Award TR35
- Scientific career
- Fields: Neurotechnology; Electrical engineering
- Workplaces: École Polytechnique Fédérale de Lausanne (EPFL)
- Website: https://www.epfl.ch/labs/lsbi/

Stéphanie P. Lacour (born c. 1975) is a French neurotechnologist and full professor holding the Foundation Bertarelli Chair in Neuroprosthetic Technology at the Swiss Federal Institute of Technology in Lausanne (EPFL). Since January 2025, she is Vice President for Support to Strategic Initiatives at EPFL.

Lacour is a pioneer in the field of stretchable electronics and directs a laboratory at EPFL which specializes in the development of Soft BioElectronic Interfaces to enable seamless integration of neuroprosthetic devices into human tissues. Lacour is also a co-founding member and director of the Center for Neuroprosthetics at the EPFL Satellite Campus in Geneva, Switzerland.

== Early life and education ==
Lacour was born around 1975 and grew up in France. She completed her M.Sc. in Integrated Electronic Devices at the Institut National des Sciences Appliquées (INSA) in Lyon, France, in 1998. After completing her master's degree, Lacour remained at INSA and conducted her graduate studies in Electrical Engineering from 1998 to 2001. In 2001, Lacour moved to the United States to work under the mentorship of Dr. Sigurd Wagner as postdoctoral researcher at Princeton University. During her time at Princeton, Lacour made significant advancements in developing stretchable electronics that could be implemented in biological systems more easily than typical electronic hardware. Lacour finished her postdoctoral work in 2005 and began further postdoctoral work at the University of Cambridge under the mentorship of Dr. James Fawcett where she began to explore the therapeutic potential of her technologies in repairing nerves after injury. In 2007, Lacour received the University Research Fellowship from the Royal Society and became a Research Project Manager and head of the Stretchable Bioelectronics group at the Nanoscience Centre in Cambridge, UK.

=== Stretchable integrated circuits ===
In 2003, Lacour published a paper looking at implementing thin gold stripes onto elastomeric substances to make electronic skins more flexible and stretchable. She found that inducing micrometer long cracks in the gold made the stripes more stretchable, while inducing buckles in the gold made the stripes have lower resistance. Lacour and Wagner further found that electrical continuity could be preserved in gold stripes with micro-fractures, even when stretched by 1% and strained by up to 22%. The incredible degree of malleability and preserved electrical continuity that these thin gold films exhibit poised them to be essential in the future construction of 3D electronic circuits. An alternative to inducing micro-fractures in gold to enhance stretchability, is inducing wave-like buckles by placing the gold films on pre-stretched elastomeric substrates. Once these substrates relax, the gold creates surface waves which are repeatedly stretchable and can serve as interconnects for skin-like electronic circuits.

=== Stretchable Electrodes and Brain Injury Repair ===
After developing these elastic technologies at Princeton, Lacour implemented stretchable microelectrode arrays (SMEAs) into organotypic hippocampal slice culture models of traumatic brain injury (TBI) to measure neural activity prior to, during, and after a trauma-like event. This tool will enable a better understanding of the biophysical changes during and resulting from injury to determine how neuronal dysfunction manifests in TBI.

Once Lacour began her position as a Research Fellow at the University of Cambridge, she collaborated with surgeons and other medical professionals to explore the potential of using her stretchable circuits and electrodes for nerve repair after injury. Since injured axons can be assisted in their regeneration through mechanical guidance, Lacour sought to design an implantable device to mechanically guide axon repair. Using polyimide as the substrate, Lacour rolled 2D gold microelectrodes and microchannels into 3D channel bundles to fit around axons. These 3D electrode channel devices fixed to polymer substrates not only provide an innovative tool for in vivo guided axon regeneration but also set the stage for in vivo electrode implants that can communicate with multiple groups of nerve fibers, one day possibly enabling effective communication between a prosthetic and the human body.

Lacour later began to experiment with different substrates with which to build stretchable electronics that are more compatible with biological systems in vivo. Instead of using rigid, inorganic materials, like silicon, Lacour tested the viability of using pulsed lasers to create diamond-like carbon microstructures on polydimethylsiloxane. She found that human skin cells were able to coat the substrate, making the technology suitable for future incorporation in medical devices and prostheses. To further explore the potential of creating efficient and biocompatible in vivo neural interfaces, Lacour and her colleagues focused their attention to making microelectrode arrays more mechanically compliant. By embedding thin, gold microelectrodes in a polymer that can be rolled and flexed, Lacour and her team were able to create improved interfaces between the device and neural tissue.

Another goal of Lacour's research in Cambridge was to apply her stretchable electronics to produce sensory e-skins, so she began to design technologies in this realm. Lacour applied her thin, gold films onto silicone rubber and was able to create multifunctional, capacitative sensors that can detect and localize touch as well as record pressure and strain. Merging this tool with commercial transducer electronics will enable the production of sensory e-skins. The e-skins that Lacour was working towards developing could be merged with her in vivo stretchable electronic interfaces to enable people with prosthetic limbs to not only sense their environment with their prosthesis but also integrate it into their nervous system such that they have autonomous mental control over their own limbs.

== Career and research ==
In 2011, Lacour was recruited to the Swiss Federal Institute of Technology in Lausanne (EPFL) as a tenure track assistant professor of microtechnology and bioengineering at the School of Engineering. In 2016, Lacour was promoted to associate professor. The following year, in 2017, Lacour was granted full professorship and was honored with the Bertarelli Foundation Chair in Neuroprosthetic Technology at the School of Engineering at EPFL. As a co-founding member of EPFL Center for Neuroprosthetics, Lacour was promoted to Director of the center in 2018, located at EPFL's Campus Biotech in Geneva. At EPFL, Lacour currently leads the Laboratory for Soft Bioelectronics Interfaces where she explores how to design novel, soft, skin-like circuits that will integrate into long term bi-directional neural implants and wearable prosthetic sensor skins. Outside of EPFL, Lacour is a member of the Materials Research Society as well as a member of the Institute of Electrical and Electronics Engineers.

=== Using soft, flexible electronic circuits in vivo ===
In 2010, Lacour was awarded a European Research Council Grant to support her initiative, ESKIN aimed at designing and improving current electronic systems to increase their stretchability to make them compatible with biological tissues while maintaining electrical functionality. Shortly after, Lacour was invited to give a TEDx talk at CERN In 2011 where she discussed her current research applying soft, flexible electronic circuits in addressing hearing loss in humans. Because her soft machines are able to integrate with human nerves, Lacour says that, "These machines will help us to continue to be human". For example, Lacour and her team designed auditory brainstem implants adhered to polyimide substrates that have specific and enhanced interfaces with auditory neurons. These tiny, flexible electrodes are inserted into cochlea, and deliver electrical pulses along the nerve to transduce sound from the environment into signals that the brain can interpret. By creating machines that have physical properties that are compatible with biological tissues, Lacour is able to establish a communication link between the external world, the device, and the brain to enhance the quality of life for people suffering from hearing loss.

In 2012, Lacour gave a talk at TEDxHelvetia discussing the use of silicon rubber as a substrate for electronic circuit construction, and the trick of combining these flexible materials with typical electronic conductive materials to enable electrical function. She deems this the "soft to hard challenge" - making electronic 3D structures that interface the most delicate tissues like nerves, spinal cords, and the brain. To tackle this challenge, Lacour took a new approach, in an article published in 2013, where instead of using full and uniform elastomers, Lacour experimented with flexible, heterogeneous foams. Since foam is a network of air bubbles, Lacour found that building metallic pathways between the bubbles kept the conductive materials intact and elasticity over 100% could be achieved. With this enhanced flexibility and maintained conductivity, these new flexible circuits can be implemented in electrodes, sensors, and biocompatible connections.

=== e-dura or Electronic Dura Mater ===
By 2015, Lacour and her team at EPFL had developed a groundbreaking technology called e-dura, short for electronic dura mater. In its mechanical properties, the e-dura technology resembles biological dura mater, the thick protective coating around tissues of the central nervous system. However, e-ura integrates electrical and pharmacological stimulation to return spinal cord function and mobility in rodents. The part of this technology that allows it to return function to the nervous system of a living animal, is the biocompatibility. e-dura accommodates deformations, since it is made from Lacour's stretchable, soft, electronic circuits, and this allows it to move with the body and prevent irritation and resistance that might lead to scarring and inflammation. Further, this technology has a fluidic microchannel that enables delivery of neurotransmitters which help to pharmacologically regenerate nervous tissue. Lacour and Grégoire Courtine, co-principal investigator in this research endeavour, tested their e-dura technology on paralyzed rats and, incredibly, these rats were able to regain spinal cord and limb function, enabling them to walk again.

=== Nerve-on-a-chip platform ===
Though e-Dura already substantially progressed the field towards effective neuroprosthetics, one major limiting factor that still remains is the ability to precisely record neural activity in order to seamlessly integrate the internal motivation and neural activity in an organism with the desired output of the prosthetic. In a therapeutic setting, the desired output of a neuroprosthetic can encompass a range of things from motor activity, such as driving muscles to fire and limbs to move, to silencing pain in chronic pain patients, to enabling amputees with the sensation of touch again. As such, Lacour and her team developed a "nerve-on-a-chip" platform that is able to stimulate and record neural activity in nerve fibers. Astonishingly, their technology, consisting of microfabricated electrode arrays, is able to record up to hundreds of individual neurons with a resolution at the level of individual neurons. This technology also enabled photothermic inhibition of neurons, a capability that might one day be adapted to treat chronic pain. Lastly, Lacour and her team used the neural recordings to train an algorithm to discern motor neuron signals from sensory signals which will one day enable the technology to bi-directionally control sensation and motor function.

== Awards and honors ==
- 2015 SNSF-ERC Consolidator Grant
- 2015 Young Global Leader by the World Economic Forum
- 2014 "40 extraordinary scientists under the age of 40" in the 2014 World Economic Forum
- 2011 Zonta Award
- 2010 European Research Council ERC Starting Grant
- 2007 University Research Fellowship from the Royal Society (UK)
- 2006 MIT Technology Review Young Innovator Award TR35

== Select media ==
- 2015 Radio Suisse Romande "Rencontre avec Stéphanie Lacour"
- 2015 La Recherche "Electrochemical stimulation: Response from Stéphanie Lacour"
- 2011 La Recherche "ELASTIC ELECTRONICS Very thin skin covered with sensors"
- 2011 Lacour appears in Women in Business "Top 100"
- 2011 Radio Suisse Romande La Cyber peau – Interview of Prof. Lacour for Impatience – Radio Suisse Romande
- 2011 The Economist "A Shapely future for circuits - Report on Stretchable Electronics"

== Select publications ==
- Dejace, L., Laubeuf, N., Furfaro, I. and Lacour, S.P. (2019), Gallium‐Based Thin Films for Wearable Human Motion Sensors. Adv. Intell. Syst., 1: 1900079. doi:10.1002/aisy.201900079
- Hirsch, A., Lacour, S. P., A Method to Form Smooth Films of Liquid Metal Supported by Elastomeric Substrate. Adv. Sci. 2018, 5, 1800256. https://doi.org/10.1002/advs.201800256
- Gribi, S., du Bois de Dunilac, S., Ghezzi, D. & Stephanie P. Lacour. A microfabricated nerve-on-a-chip platform for rapid assessment of neural conduction in explanted peripheral nerve fibers. Nat Commun 9, 4403 (2018). https://doi.org/10.1038/s41467-018-06895-7
- N. Vachicouras; C. M. Tringides; P. B. Campiche; S. P. Lacour : Engineering reversible elasticity in ductile and brittle thin films supported by a plastic foil; Extreme Mechanics Letters. 2017. DOI : 10.1016/j.eml.2017.05.005.
- H. O. Michaud, J. Teixidor and S. P. Lacour, "Soft flexion sensors integrating stretchable metal conductors on a silicone substrate for smart glove applications," 2015 28th IEEE International Conference on Micro Electro Mechanical Systems (MEMS), Estoril, 2015, pp. 760–763.
- Gerratt, A.P., Michaud, H.O. and Lacour, S.P. (2015), Elastomeric Electronic Skin for Prosthetic Tactile Sensation. Adv. Funct. Mater., 25: 2287–2295. doi:10.1002/adfm.201404365
- A. Guex; N. Vachicouras; A. E. Hight; M. C. Brown; D. J. Lee and Stephanie Lacour. Conducting polymer electrodes for auditory brainstem implants; Journal of Materials Chemistry B. 2015. DOI : 10.1039/c5tb00099h.
- I. R. Minev; P. Musienko; A. Hirsch; Q. Barraud; N. Wenger.., Stephanie P. Lacour: Biomaterials. Electronic dura mater for long-term multimodal neural interfaces; Science. 2015. DOI : 10.1126/science.1260318.
- Lacour, S.: Concurrent recordings of bladder afferents from multiple nerves using a microfabricated PDMS microchannel electrode array; E. Delivopoulos, D. Chew, I.R. Minev, J.W. Fawcett, S.P. Lacour; Lab on Chip, 2012, doi:10.1039/c2lc21277c
- Lacour, S.: A regenerative microchannel neural interface for recording from and stimulating peripheral axons in vivo; J.J. FitzGerald, N. Lago, S. Benmerah, J. Serra, C.P. Watling, R.E. Cameron, E. Tarte, S.P. Lacour, S.B McMahon and J.W. Fawcett; Journal of Neural Engineering, 2012, vol. 9, 016010.
- Lacour, S.: Silicone substrate with in situ relief for stretchable thin-film transistors; I.M. Graz, D.P.J. Cotton, A. Robinson, S.P. Lacour; Applied Physics Letters, 2011, vol. 98, 124101.
- Lacour, S.: Micro-channel electrode arrays: a novel type of regenerative peripheral nerve interface (Journal Cover); S.P. Lacour, J.J. FitzGerald, N. Lago, E. Tarte, S. McMahon, J.W. Fawcett; IEEE Transactions on Neural Systems and Rehabilitation Engineering, special issue on Neural interfaces to the Peripheral Nervous System, 2009, vol. 17, no. 5, p. 454 – 460.
- Lacour, S.: Stretchable interconnects for elastic electronic surfaces; S.P. Lacour, J. Jones, S. Wagner, T. Li, Z. Suo; Proceedings of the IEEE on Flexible Electronics Technology, 2005, vol. 93, no. 8, p. 1459 – 1467.
- Lacour, S.: Stretchable gold conductors on elastomeric substrates; S. Périchon Lacour, S. Wagner, Z. Huang, Z. Suo Applied Physics Letters, 2003, vol. 82, no.15, p. 2404 – 2406.
