= Mark Gasson =

British research scientist

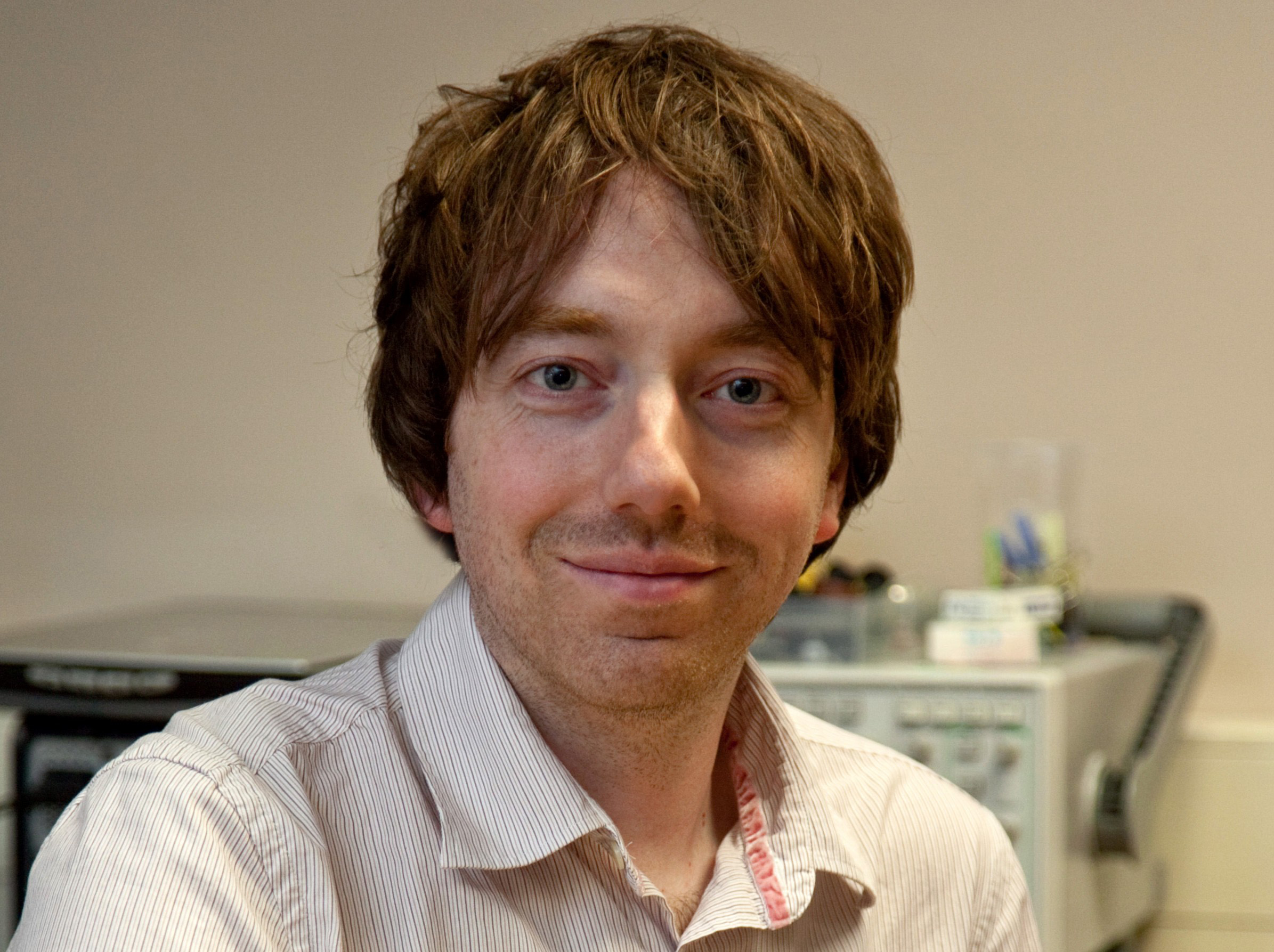
- Gasson in May 2009
- Born: Mark N. Gasson; West Sussex, England
- Education: University of Reading (BSc, PhD)
- Scientific career
- Fields: Direct neural interfaces; Implantable technology
- Thesis: Extending human interaction via invasive neural implants (2005)
- Doctoral advisor: Kevin Warwick

Mark N. Gasson is a British scientist and visiting research fellow at the Cybernetics Research Group, University of Reading, UK. He pioneered developments in direct neural interfaces between computer systems and the human nervous system, has developed brain–computer interfaces and is active in the research fields of human microchip implants, medical devices and digital identity. He is known for his experiments transmitting a computer virus into a human implant, and is credited with being the first human infected with a computer virus.

Gasson has featured on television documentaries including Through the Wormhole with Morgan Freeman, international television and radio news programs, and has delivered public lectures discussing his work including at TEDx. In 2010 Gasson was the General chair for the IEEE International Symposium on Technology and Society 2010 (ISTAS'10) and in 2014 he was entered into the Guinness Book of Records for his experimental work on implantable microchips.

He is currently based in Los Angeles, California.

== Early life and education ==
Gasson obtained his first degree in Cybernetics and Control Engineering in 1998 from the Department of Cybernetics at Reading. He obtained his Ph.D. for 2002 work on interfacing the nervous system of a human to a computer system in 2005.

== Career ==
From 2000 until 2005 Gasson headed research to invasively interface the nervous system of a human to a computer. In 2002 a microelectrode array was implanted in the median nerve of a healthy human and connected percutaneously to a bespoke processing unit to allow stimulation of nerve fibers to artificially generate sensation perceivable by the subject and recording of local nerve activity to form control commands for wirelessly connected devices.

During clinical evaluation of the implant, the nervous system of the human subject, Kevin Warwick, was connected onto the internet in Columbia University, New York enabling a robot arm, developed by Peter Kyberd, in the University of Reading UK to use the subject's neural signals to mimic the subject's hand movements while allowing the subject to perceive what the robot touched from sensors in the robot's finger tips. Further studies also demonstrated a form of extra sensory input and that it was possible to communicate directly between the nervous systems of two individuals, the first direct and purely electronic communication between the nervous systems of two humans, with a view to ultimately creating a form of telepathy or empathy using the Internet to communicate 'brain-to-brain'. Because of the potentially wide reaching implications for human enhancement of the research discussed by Gasson and his group, the work was dubbed 'Project Cyborg' by the media.

As of 2005, this was the first study in which this type of implant had been used with a human subject and Gasson was subsequently awarded a PhD for this work.

=== Invasive brain interfaces (2005) ===
Gasson and his colleagues, together with neurosurgeon Tipu Aziz and his team at John Radcliffe Hospital, Oxford, and physiologist John Stein of the University of Oxford, have been working on Deep brain stimulation for movement disorders such as Parkinson's disease.

In order to improve control of abnormal spontaneous electrical activity in the brains of patients with movement disorders, as of 2010 they have been developing a combined deep brain recording and stimulating device that will record deep brain signals and from these predict the onset of symptoms such as tremor and dystonic bursts and deliver a short pulse of high frequency stimulation to stop the symptoms before they have even started.

=== The Future of Identity (2004–2009) ===
From 2004 to 2009 Gasson headed a group of academics and industry professionals drawn from 24 institutions across Europe as part of the European Commission funded FIDIS project targeting various aspects of digital identity and privacy, in particular emerging technologies used for identification and profiling. As well as authoring reports on profiling, ambient intelligence and ICT implants, Gasson also went public over privacy concerns related to misuse of location information from GPS devices in smartphones, and was a contributor to FIDIS's controversial Budapest Declaration on Machine Readable Travel Documents which criticized European governments for forcing their citizens to adopt electronic passports which "decrease security and privacy and increase the risk of identity theft".

=== First human infected with computer virus (2009) ===
In March 2009 Gasson had a glass capsule RFID device surgically implanted into his left hand. The implant was used as an identification device for the University of Reading's intelligent building infrastructure to gain building access. Gasson's smartphone was also augmented with a reader so that the phone would only function when he was holding it.

In April 2010 following experiments showing the potential vulnerabilities of implantable technology, Gasson's team demonstrated how a computer virus could wirelessly infect his implant and then be transmitted on to other systems. Gasson drew parallels with other implantable devices, such as cardiac pacemakers, which he asserted were vulnerable because of a tendency of manufacturers to adopt a "security through obscurity" methodology rather than robust security methods. He also argued that as functions of the body are restored or enhanced by implanted devices, the boundaries of the body (i.e., the human experience of the body's delimitation) become increasingly unclear. As a result, the separation between man and machine simply becomes theoretical, meaning that the technology becomes perceived by the human as being a part of their body and so should be considered as such. He argues that this development in our traditional notion of what constitutes our body and its boundaries has two notable repercussions: Firstly, it becomes possible to talk in terms of a human, albeit a technologically enhanced human, becoming for instance infected by a computer virus or hacked by a third party. This forms the basis of his claim to be the first human infected by a computer virus. Secondly, this development of the concept of the is considered a fundamental right.

In 2010 Gasson was the General chair for the IEEE International Symposium on Technology and Society 2010 (ISTAS'10).

== Research ==
Gasson is a proponent of human enhancement using technology implanted into the body, and argues that advanced medical device technology will inevitably drift to non-medical augmentation applications in humans. He also strongly argues that with technology implanted in humans, the separation between man and machine can become theoretical because the technology can be perceived by the human as being a part of their body. Because of this he reasons that, as the boundaries of the human body (the human experience of the body's delimitation) become increasingly unclear, it should be accepted that the technology augmentation is a part of the body.

Gasson is an advocate of interdisciplinary collaboration and co-authors with social scientists, philosophers, legal researchers and ethicists to consider the wider implications of his field.

=== Controversy ===
The research attracted criticism from computer security blogger Graham Cluley who stated "Predictions of pacemakers and cochlear implants being hit by virus infections is the very worst kind of scaremongering". In 2012 academic Prof Kevin Fu of the University of Massachusetts Amherst disclosed an attack which "would have switched off a heart defibrillator" adding "there are vulnerabilities [in medical devices] but there is a perceived lack of threats". Similarly Barnaby Jack a researcher at security firm McAfee demonstrated an attack on an implantable insulin pump.

Some critics have questioned the need to implant the technology to investigate the issues "...it makes no difference if an RFID chip is injected under your skin or stitched into the lining of your jacket...". Gasson argued that many people with implants, including medical devices, consider them to be a part of their body and so it is evident that you cannot simply separate the human and the technology that easily - "actually having something implanted is extremely different to bench testing a piece of hardware because it adds the person and their experiences into the mix. It is seemingly difficult to get across the psychological impact involved in this type of deployment, and this is why I was so keen to test this on myself ... feeling technology to be a part of you is something you probably need to experience to understand".
