= Massimo Grattarola =

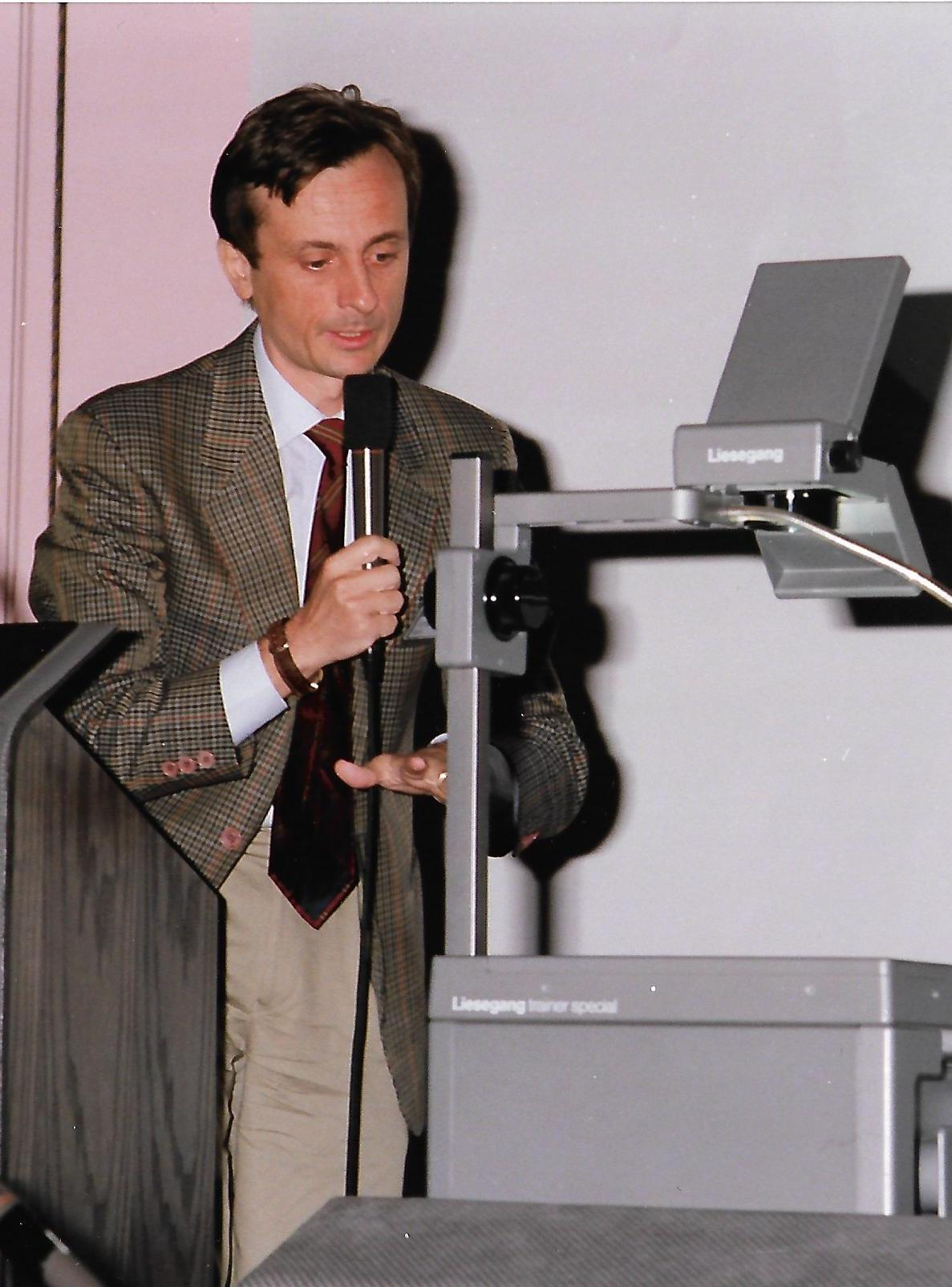
- During a lecture at the University of Genoa
- Born: 27 January 1950; Genoa, Italy
- Died: 15 February 2002 (aged 52); Genoa, Italy
- Education: University of Genoa (physics, 1975)
- Scientific career
- Fields: Bioelectronics, neuroengineering
- Workplaces: University of Genoa

Massimo Grattarola (27 January 1950 – 15 February 2002) was an Italian physicist and bioengineer. A professor at the University of Genoa, he worked on bioelectronics and on recording the activity of cultured neurons with microelectrode arrays, and co-wrote the Bioelectronics Handbook (1998). The International Summer School on Neuroengineering in Genoa is named after him.

== Biography ==
Grattarola was born on 27 January 1950 in Genoa, Italy. He graduated in physics in 1975 at the University of Genoa, with a thesis on "Computer simulation of the cerebral linguistic circuit" supervised by the physicist Antonio Borsellino. His later research combined biophysics and neuroscience. After a training period at the research center of Biophysics and Cybernetics in Camogli (Genova), he spent one year as a research associate at the Department of Biophysics and Physiology, Temple University, Philadelphia, U.S. During this period, he focused his research activities on optical cytometry.He studied the effects of electromagnetic fields at the cellular and molecular level.

In 1978 he came back to Italy as assistant professor in Applied Biophysics at the Faculty of Engineering, University of Genoa, and in 1982 he was one of the co-founders of the Biophysical and Electronic Engineering Department where he worked until his death in Genova on 15 February, 2002. In 1986 he became Associate Professor: he taught Bioelectronics for the Electronic Engineering degree and, since 1995, Bioelectrochemistry for the Biomedical Engineering degree. During this period, he set up a research group on Neural and Bioelectronics Technologies, drawing an ever-increasing number of PhD students working on research activities focused on the coupling between microelectronic devices and excitable cells.

In the years, he got and kept in contact with international research groups interested in the cross-fertilization and synergies coming from the mixture of different know-how and disciplines. In 1991 and 1997 he was invited, by Prof. Gregory Kovacs, as a visiting professor at the Centre for Integrated System, Stanford University, U.S. Here, following the pioneering works carried out by Prof. Guenter W. Gross, he started a project aiming to exploit the potentialities of the Microelectrode Arrays technique in the field of the in vitro electrophysiology to investigate networks of cultured neurons. In 2000, he was appointed full professor of Electronic Bioengineering, and became the chairman of the PhD program in Bioelectronics and Bioengineering at the Faculty of Engineering, University of Genova.

His scientific curriculum is well emphasized by more than 70 papers issued in international journals, by several contributions to scientific books, and by invited talks in workshops and conferences. He introduced, first in Italy, the concept of Bioelectronics. He was the only one in Italy to have a chair in Bioelectronics for the Biomedical Engineering degree. He was firmly convinced that Bioelectronics is the result of the cross-fertilization between micro-/nano-electronics and molecular biology of the cell. This idea led to the publication of the book Bioelectronics Handbook: MOSFETs, Biosensors, and Neurons edited by McGraw-Hill, 1998. Indeed, the book deals with phenomena occurring in semiconductor materials, biological materials, aqueous solutions and solid-liquid junctions, and represents the conceptual framework for the design of hybrid bio-electronic devices and of biologically inspired artificial devices and systems. The book is intended to provide a contribution to the foundation of this new discipline (Bioelectronics), by describing all the aforementioned phenomena by means of a common elementary physico-mathematical language; in this way MOSFETs, biosensors and neurons are viewed under a common perspective. The book represents a self-consistent reference for teachers of courses dealing with bioengineering, biotechnology, applied biophysics, and microelectronic biosensors.

During the mid and late 90s, Grattarola renewed and further developed his keen interests in mathematical modelling of neural systems and bioelectronics hybrids. His early contributions to develop equivalent electrical circuit models accounting for the biophysics of the interface between microelectrodes and excitable cell membranes are notable. His intuitions towards novel developments in the field of computational neurosciences inspired subsequent academic careers of several of his collaborators to combine experimental research with the use of computers and electrical circuit simulator software tackling neurobiological questions as well as in the study of pancreatic beta-cells. Later, he devoted his efforts and attention to the Neuroengineering field by proposing initiatives both at local and international levels for joint research projects and as the proposal of an International Research Center on Neuroengineering in Genova, which did not come to light because of his premature death. He organized the first Neuroengineering Summer School at the University of Genoa in 2001. The International Summer School of Neuroengineering, held every two years in Genova, is dedicated to his memory.

== Founder of Bioelectronics in Italy ==
A pioneer in multidisciplinary research and creative ability of doing science and teaching.

He introduced in Italy the concept of Bioelectronics, and he was the first engineer in Italy to have a chair in Bioelectronics for the Biomedical Engineering degree. Grattarola's ambition was to drive engineers and physicists towards neurophysiology and neuroscience and to define a novel multidisciplinary field which he named neurobioengineering or neuroengineering.

One of the research fields which Grattarola mostly contributed to was the study of the electrophysiological signals of in vitro cultured neurons. Thanks to his expertise on biological systems, he was fascinated by the possibility to investigate not only the changes in the neuronal network morphology, such as the neurite growth, but also the electrophysiological activity of the neurons; this research was carried out by using innovative devices: the Micro-Electrode Arrays (MEAs). These thin-film micro-machined devices were made up of biocompatible material and could house up to one hundred of substrate-integrated embedded microelectrodes. Neural cells could be directly deposited on this substrate, pre-coated with adhesion proteins, grown and kept in culture, as in a normal Petri dish, for a period of time that goes from a few weeks up to months or even one year.

As a result of international collaborations and to the work done in his lab, Grattarola and his group reached important achievements in the field of MEA electrophysiology, offering to the scientific community milestone results on in vitro neurotoxicology and pharmacology, dynamics of cell cultures, and investigations on network plasticity via electrical stimulation.

In addition to the experimental research, a modeling activity about coupling electronic devices (metal-microelectrodes and FET-based) to neurons and complex neuronal networks, was also carried out by using simulation programs such as SPICE.

Neurobioengineering, Neuroengineering and the first European bio-artificial brain

In 1999, Massimo Grattarola created an undergraduate and graduate program named Neurobioengineering (also referred to as neuroengineering). The program was designed to amalgamate anthropomorphic robotics, artificial intelligence, bioelectronics, electrical engineering, molecular biology, physics, and medicine, into a single program with the aim of developing advanced bio-compatible neuro-prosthetic implants (man-machine interfacing) for a variety applications (e.g. nervous system interaction with artificial limbs, central and peripheral nervous system implants, directional neural grafting (neural engineering), electron harvesting from biological processes to power implanted devices, neural arrays cultured on CMOS sensors, etc.).

In September 2001, the European Commission, within the framework of Future and Emerging Technologies (FET) appointed Grattarola as a Program Coordinator of the project "Neurobit", to study the bi-directional interaction between a culture of neurons and a small mobile robot, pointing out that, thanks to the continuous dialogue between a neuronal culture and an external agent, the neural element (i.e. the cortical culture) was able to learn and improve its behavior, translated in terms of robotic performances. The robot was placed in a round arena with obstacles and the task to be accomplished consisted of (learning to) avoiding them, improving trial after trial. The robot was controlled by the in vitro neuronal cultures, which received electrical stimulation, while the robot was approaching an obstacle and, in turn, the produced output electrophysiological signals were used to control the angular velocity of the robot's wheels. This bio-artificial brain was unique in the European panorama at the time of the Neurobit project, and allowed Grattarola and his team to pioneering closed-loop hybrid systems, as a possible base of future bi-directional neural interfaces.

== First European School on Neuroengineering “Massimo Grattarola” ==
In 2003, the University of Genova announced the First European Neurobioengineering conference in memoriam of Massimo Grattarola, and in 2004, the First European School on Neuroengineering "Massimo Grattarola" was founded with the goal of establishing a long-term educational program to foster future pioneers in neuroengineering, full-filling Massimo Grattarola's ambitions, and offering degrees in Humanoid Technologies.

== Accreditation ==
More than 70 papers issued in international journals, several contributions to scientific books, invited talks in workshops and conferences. A selected list is here below.

== Selected publications ==
[1] M. Grattarola, V. Torre, “Necessary and sufficient condition for synchronization of nonlinear oscillators with a given class of coupling”, IEEE Transactions on Circuits and Systems, CAS-24, 4, pp. 209–215, (1976).
[2] A. Chiabrera, M. Grattarola, G. Vernazza, R. Viviani, “Bioelectrochemical system models, electromagnetic interactions and noise”, Bioelectrochemistry and Bioenergetics, 5, pp. 97–115, (1978).
[3] M. Grattarola, P. Carlo, G. Giannetti, R. Finollo, R. Viviani, A Chiabrera, “Laser flow measurements of scattering and fluorescence from cell nuclei in the presence of increasing Mg++ concentrations”, Biophysical Journal, 47, pp. 461–468, (1985).
[4] C. Falugi, M. Grattarola, G. Prestipino, “Effects of low-intensity pulsed electromagnetic fields on the early development of sea urchins” Biophysical Journal, 51, pp. 999–1003, (1987).
[5] M. Grattarola, M. Tedesco, A. Cambiaso, G. Perlo, G. Gianetti, A. Sanguineti, “Cell adhesion to silicon substrata: characterization by means of optical and acoustic cytometric techniques”, Biomaterials, 9, pp. 101–107, (1988).
[6] M. Grattarola, A. Cambiaso, S. Cenderelli, M. Tedesco, “Capacitive measurements in electrolyte-insulator-semiconductor systems modified by biological materials”, Sensors and Actuators, 17, pp. 451–459, (1989).
[7] M. Grattarola, G. Arnaldi, A. Cambiaso, S. Martinoia, G. Massobrio, “Interfacing excitable cells with integrated devices”, Proc. of the 1st International Conference of the IEEE Engineering in Medicine & Biology Society (EMBS), Seattle, Washington, USA, pp. 1346–1347, 9–12 November, (1989).
[8] A. Cambiaso, M. Grattarola, G. Arnaldi, S. Martinoia, G. Massobrio, “Detection of cell activity via ISFET devices: modelling and computer simulations”, Sensors and Actuators, B.1, pp. 373–379, (1990).
[9] G. Massobrio, S. Martinoia, M. Grattarola, “Light-addressable chemical sensors: modelling and computer simulations”, Sensors & Actuators, B, 7, pp. 484–487, (1992).
[10] M. Grattarola, G. Massobrio, S. Martinoia, “Modelling H+-sensitive FETs with SPICE”, IEEE Transactions on Electron Devices, ED. 39, 4, pp. 813–819, (1992).
[11] S. Martinoia, M. Grattarola, G. Massobrio, “Modelling non-ideal behaviours in H+ sensitive FETs with SPICE”, Sensors and Actuators, B, 7, 1–3, pp. 561–564, (1992).
[12] M. Grattarola, S. Martinoia, “Modeling the neuron-microtransducer junction: from extracellular to patch recording”, IEEE Transaction on Biomedical Engineering, 40, 1, pp. 35–41, (1993).
[13] S. Martinoia, M. Bove, G. Carlini, C. Ciccarelli, M. Grattarola, C. Storment, G.T.A. Kovacs, "A general purpose system for long-term recording from a microelectrode array coupled to excitable cells", Journal of Neuroscience Methods, 48, pp. 115 - 121, (1993).
[14] M. Bove, G. Massobrio, S. Martinoia, M. Grattarola, "Realistic simulations of neurons by means of an ad hoc modified version of SPICE", Biological Cybernetics, 71, pp. 137–145, (1994).
[15] M. Grattarola, M. Bove, S. Martinoia, G. Massobrio, "Silicon neuron simulation with SPICE: tool for neurobiology and neural networks", Medical & Biological Engineering & Computing, 33, 533–536, (1995).
[16] M. Bove, M. Grattarola, S. Martinoia, G. Verreschi, "Interfacing cultured neurons to planar substrate microelectrodes: characterization of the neuron-to-microelectrode junction", Bioelectrochemistry and Bioenergetics, 38, pp. 255–265, (1995).
[17] M. Bove, S. Martinoia, M. Grattarola, D. Ricci, "The neuron- transistor junction: linking equivalent electric circuit models to microscopic descriptions", Thin Solid Films, 284–285, pp.772-775, (1996).
[18] R. Raiteri, S. Martinoia, M. Grattarola, "pH-dependent charge density at the insulator-electrolyte interface probed by a Scanning Force Microscope", Biosensors & Bioelectronics, 11, 1009–1018, (1996).
[19] A. Cambiaso, L. Delfino, M. Grattarola, G. Verreschi, D. Ashworth, A. Maines, P. Vadgama, "Modelling and simulation of a diffusion limited glucose biosensor", Sensors and Actuators, B 33/1-3, pp. 203–207, (1996).
[20] M. Bove, M. Grattarola, G. Verreschi, "In vitro 2D networks of neurons characterized by processing the signals recorded with a planar microtransducer array", IEEE Transactions on Biomedical Engineering, 44, pp. 964–977, (1997).
[21] M. Storace, M. Bove, M. Grattarola, M. Parodi, "Simulations of the behavior of synaptically driven neurons via time-invariant circuit models", IEEE Transactions of Biomedical Engineering, 44, pp. 1282–1287, (1997).
[22] M. Bove, S. Martinoia, G. Verreschi, M. Giugliano, M. Grattarola, "Analysis of the signals generated by networks of neurons coupled to planar arrays of microtransducers in simulated experiments", Biosensors and Bioelectronics, 13, pp. 601–612, (1998).
[23] S. Martinoia, M. Bove, M. Tedesco, B. Margesin, M. Grattarola, "A simple microfluidic system for patterning populations of neurons on silicon micromachined substrates", Journal of Neuroscience Methods, 87, pp. 35–44, (1999).
[24] M. Giugliano, M. Bove, M. Grattarola, “Fast calculation of short-term depressing synaptic conductances”, Neural Computation, 11, 5, pp. 1413–1426, MIT Press, (1999).
[25] M. Giugliano, M. Bove, M. Grattarola, “Insulin Release at the Molecular Level: Metabolic-Electrophysiological Modeling of the Pancreatic Beta-Cells”, IEEE Transactions on Biomedical Engineering, 47, 5, pp. 611–623, (2000).
[26] M. Giugliano, M. Grattarola, G. Le Masson, “Electrophysiological activity to cell metabolism signal transduction”, Neurocomputing, 38–40, pp. 23–30, (2001).

== See also ==
- Neurobioengineering
- Microelectrode Arrays
