= Budapest Declaration =

Budapest Declaration could refer to:

- Budapest Memorandum on Security Assurances of 1994, regarding Ukraine
- International Union of Food Science and Technology Budapest Declaration of 1995
- Budapest Open Access Initiative declaration of 2002
- Budapest Declaration on Machine Readable Travel Documents of 2006
