= Robert Boyle Lecture =

The Robert Boyle Lecture is a lecture series delivered to the Oxford University Scientific Club (formerly the Oxford University Junior Scientific Club) at the University of Oxford, England. The first lecture was delivered in 1892.

== The lectures ==
- 1 - The place in science and the character of Robert Boyle
- 2 - Molecular Tactics of a Crystal
- 5 - Argon and Helium, the Two Recently Discovered Gases
- 8 - Magnetism in Growth
- 9 - The rise of the experimental method in Oxford
- 13 - The Pressure of Light
- 14 - The Scope and Importance to the State of the Science of National Eugenics
- 17 - The Fertility of the Soil
- 18 - The Growth of a Crystal
- 21 - Nationality and Race (delivered by Arthur Keith)
- 22 - Anthropology and history
- 23 - Electrons and Ether Waves
- 27 - The Geological Age of the Earth
- 28 - Recent Developments in Atomic Theory
- 33 - The Problems of Specificity in Biochemical Catalysis
- 39 - The structure of alloys
- 49 - Anatomical pattern as the essential basis of sensory discrimination
- 50 - Science and International Relations
- 53 - A Hundred Years of Spectroscopy...

== Lecturers ==
In 1998, the lecture was presented by Kevin Warwick.
