= Real Robots =

Partwork magazine established in May 2001

Real Robots was a fortnightly partwork magazine by Eaglemoss Publications, established in May 2001. Developed in partnership with Reading University, it allowed the reader to build a robot, "Cybot", and later a companion robot, "Tom". This series, which was released in eight countries, is now discontinued.

== Construction phases ==
There were 96 issues of the magazine, divided into 5 phases:

- Phase 1 - Issues 1 to 17 - Cybot is built, and is able to follow lines on the floor, and sense light and objects.
- Phase 2 - Issues 18 to 40 - A remote control is built, along with a docking station, allowing Cybot to be programmed. Some issues also contain alternate body pieces, transforming Cybot into a 'Team Cybot', a formula-1 styled robot.
- Phase 3 - Issues 41 to 55 - Cybot becomes voice controlled with the addition of a headset to wear and some additional components for the remote control.
- Phase 4 - Issues 56 to 70 - Cybot learns to play 'football'. Infrared location sensors are added to Cybot, as well as Infrared beacons in the form of a ball and a goal.
- Phase 5 - Issues 71 to 96 - TOM (Tracking Orbital Module) is built. TOM is a smaller robot than Cybot, with a similar look. Its features include scanning sonar, a higher speed, full programmability, 'emotions', and interaction with Cybot.

== See also ==
- Kevin Warwick
