= March of the Machines =

Book by Kevin Warwick

March of the Machines: The Breakthrough in Artificial Intelligence
- Author: Kevin Warwick
- Subject: Artificial intelligence, robots, artificial general intelligence
- Publisher: University of Illinois Press
- Publication date: 1997
- Pages: 320
- ISBN: 978-0252072239

March of the Machines: Why the New Race of Robots Will Rule the World (1997, hardcover), published in paperback as March of the Machines: The Breakthrough in Artificial Intelligence (2004), is a book by Kevin Warwick. It presents an overview of robotics and artificial intelligence (AI), often focusing on anecdotes of Warwick's own work, and then imagines future scenarios. In particular, Warwick finds it likely that such AIs will become smart enough to replace humans, and humans may be unable to stop them.

== Contents ==
The book has a conversational style, with little technical detail. Warwick proposes that because machines will become more intelligent than humans, machine takeover is all but inevitable. The drive to automate is fueled by economic incentives. Even if machines start out without intentions to take over, those that self-modify in a direction toward a "will to survive" are more likely to resist being turned off. Arms races will likely create ever-increasing pressure for greater autonomy by robotic warfare systems, and this pressure would be hard to curtail. Machines have a number of advantages over human minds, including the ability to expand practically without limit and to spread into space where humans can't reach. "All the signs are that we will rapidly become merely an insignificant historical dot" (p. 301).

== Reception ==
John Durant in the New Statesman cautions against Warwick's apparent anthropomorphism: In one problematic example passage, Warwick opines that the Deep Blue computer had deliberately "let Kasparov win the overall (1996) series, having shown him in the first game who was really the better player". Durant states that "There's rather a lot of this sort of thing in March of the Machines, and it's not clear how seriously it's intended to be taken." Durant also disagreed with Warwick's thesis, stating that present-day computers "are not threats to us, but rather expressions of our power: we use the machines; they don't use us." Durant also wonders why, "If Warwick's thesis about impending world robot-domination is correct", Warwick continues to undertake cybernetic research.

Don Braben begins his review of Warwick's book by stating that "Specialists love to share dire predictions of the future, which stem from limited perspectives." Braben also states that, despite the centrality of intelligence to the thesis, Warwick fails to adequately pin down the slippery concept.

In Human Physiology, Medvedev and Aldasheva dispute Warwick's contention that machines will become superior to humans on the grounds that "machines are man-made human organs", i.e., they extend what humans do. Moreover, if machines were to rebel against humans, humans could make use of other machines to combat the rebels. If AIs were created, humans would program them to align with human goals, and while some AIs might go awry, this would not be so different from the situation of human maniacs. All told, they consider Warwick's predictions of robot rebellion "grossly exaggerated".

The blurb for the 1997 edition stated in part "Recent breakthroughs in cybernetics mean that robots already exist with the brain power of insects. Within five years, robots will exist with the brain power of cats. In ten to 50 years, robots will exist that are more intelligent than humans." Revising in 2014, Martin Robbins of Vice news quotes Warwick's predictions of robot abilities as an example of "Extravagant claims" that "have been damaging the reputation of our soon-to-be robot overlords for decades now".
