= Albrecht Böttcher =

German mathematician (born 1954)

Albrecht Böttcher (born 29 December 1954) is a German mathematician. His field of research is functional analysis.

== History ==
Böttcher was born in Oberwiesenthal, Saxony, GDR. Between 1971 and 1973, he was in an elite class for mathematics at the Chemnitz University of Technology. In 1973, he won a silver medal at the 15th International Math Olympiad in Moscow. Böttcher studied mathematics from 1975 to 1979 in Chemnitz and then went to Rostov on Don in 1980 to study and earned a PhD there in 1984. After completing his dissertation, The finite section method for the Wiener-Hopf integral operator, he worked as scientist assistance at the university of Chemnitz. Since 1992, the professor for Harmonic Analysis and Operator theory at the Chemnitz University of Technology. Since 2020 he is professor emeritus.

As of 2012, he is the author of nine books and about 180 papers.

== Selected books ==
- Böttcher, Albert; Silbermann, Bernd (2006). Analysis of Toeplitz Operators. Springer Berlin, Heidelberg. doi:10.1007/3-540-32436-4. ISBN 978-3-540-32434-8.
- Böttcher, Albert; Grudsky, Sergei M. (2005). Spectral Properties of Banded Toeplitz Matrices. SIAM. doi:10.1137/1.9780898717853. ISBN 978-0-89871-599-6.
- Böttcher, Albert; Silbermann, Bernd (1999). Introduction to Large Truncated Toeplitz Matrices. Springer New York. doi:10.1007/978-1-4612-1426-7. ISBN 978-0-387-98570-1.
- Böttcher, Albert; Dijksma, Aad; Langer, Heinz; Dritschel, Michael; Rovnyak, James; Kaashoek, Marinus A. (1995). Lancaster, Peter (ed.). Lectures on operator theory and its applications. Fields Institute Monographs. Vol. 3. American Mathematical Society. doi:10.1090/fim/003. ISBN 978-0-8218-0457-5.

== See also ==
- Pseudospectrum
