= Microelectrode array =

Device in neurophysiology

Microelectrode arrays (MEAs) (also referred to as multielectrode arrays) are devices that contain multiple (tens to thousands) microelectrodes through which neural signals are obtained or delivered, essentially serving as neural interfaces that connect neurons to electronic circuitry. There are two general classes of MEAs: implantable MEAs, used in vivo, and non-implantable MEAs, used in vitro. In each class, there are rigid, flexible, and stretchable microelectrode array.

== Theory ==
Neurons and muscle cells create ion currents through their membranes when excited, causing a change in voltage between the inside and the outside of the cell. When recording, the electrodes on an MEA transduce the change in voltage from the environment carried by ions into currents carried by electrons (electronic currents). When stimulating, electrodes transduce electronic currents into ionic currents through the media. This triggers the voltage-gated ion channels on the membranes of the excitable cells, causing the cell to depolarize and trigger an action potential if it is a neuron or a twitch if it is a muscle cell.

The size and shape of a recorded signal depend upon several factors: the nature of the medium in which the cell or cells are located (e.g. the medium's electrical conductivity, capacitance, and homogeneity); the nature of contact between the cells and the MEA electrode (e.g. area of contact and tightness); the nature of the MEA electrode itself (e.g. its geometry, impedance, and noise); the analog signal processing (e.g. the system's gain, bandwidth, and behavior outside of cutoff frequencies); and the data sampling properties (e.g. sampling rate and digital signal processing). For the recording of a single cell that partially covers a planar electrode, the voltage at the contact pad is approximately equal to the voltage of the overlapping region of the cell and electrode multiplied by the ratio the surface area of the overlapping region to the area of the entire electrode, or:

$V_{pad}=V_{overlap}\times\frac{A_{overlap}}{A_{electrode}}$

assuming the area around an electrode is well-insulated and has a very small capacitance associated with it. The equation above, however, relies on modeling the electrode, cells, and their surroundings as an equivalent circuit diagram. An alternative means of predicting cell-electrode behavior is by modeling the system using a geometry-based finite element analysis in an attempt to circumvent the limitations of oversimplifying the system in a lumped circuit element diagram.

An MEA can be used to perform electrophysiological experiments on tissue slices or dissociated cell cultures. With acute tissue slices, the connections between the cells within the tissue slices prior to extraction and plating are more or less preserved, while the intercellular connections in dissociated cultures are destroyed prior to plating. With dissociated neuronal cultures, the neurons spontaneously form networks.

It can be seen that the voltage amplitude an electrode experiences is inversely related to the distance from which a cell depolarizes. Thus, it may be necessary for the cells to be cultured or otherwise placed as close to the electrodes as possible. With tissue slices, a layer of electrically passive dead cells form around the site of incision due to edema. A way to deal with this is by fabricating an MEA with three-dimensional electrodes fabricated by masking and chemical etching. These 3-D electrodes penetrate the dead cell layer of the slice tissue, decreasing the distance between live cells and the electrodes. In dissociated cultures, proper adherence of the cells to the MEA substrate is important for getting robust signals.

== History ==
The first implantable arrays were microwire arrays developed in the 1950s. The first experiment involving the use of an array of planar electrodes to record from cultured cells was conducted in 1972 by C.A. Thomas, Jr. and his colleagues. The experimental setup used a 2 x 15 array of gold electrodes plated with platinum black, each spaced 100 μm apart from each other. Myocytes harvested from embryonic chicks were dissociated and cultured onto the MEAs, and signals up to 1 mV high in amplitude were recorded. MEAs were constructed and used to explore the electrophysiology of snail ganglia independently by Guenter Gross and his colleagues at the Center for Network Neuroscience in 1977 without prior knowledge of Thomas and his colleagues' work. In 1982, Gross observed spontaneous electrophysiological activity from dissociated spinal cord neurons, and found that activity was very dependent on temperature. Below about 30˚C signal amplitudes decrease rapidly to relatively small value at room temperature.

Before the 1990s, significant entry barriers existed for new laboratories that sought to conduct MEA research due to the custom MEA fabrication and software they had to develop. However, with the advent of affordable computing power and commercial MEA hardware and software, many other laboratories were able to undertake research using MEAs.

== Types ==
Microelectrode arrays can be divided up into subcategories based on their potential use: in vitro and in vivo arrays.

=== In vitro arrays ===
An in vitro MEA

The standard type of in vitro MEA comes in a pattern of 8 x 8 or 6 x 10 electrodes. Electrodes are typically composed of indium tin oxide, platinum black or titanium nitride and have diameters between 10 and 30 μm. These arrays are normally used for single-cell cultures or acute brain slices.

One challenge among in vitro MEAs has been imaging them with microscopes that use high power lenses, requiring low working distances on the order of micrometers. In order to avoid this problem, "thin"-MEAs have been created using cover slip glass. These arrays are approximately 180 μm allowing them to be used with high-power lenses.

Another challenge among in vitro MEAs has been the rigidity of the glass substrate, which does not replicate the soft, flexible nature of biological tissues, thus impacting cellular behavior and experimental outcomes. To address this limitation, flexible and stretchable microelectrode arrays have been developed to better simulate the mechanical properties of living tissues. Manufacturers of flexible and stretchable MEAs such as BioMedical Sustainable Elastic Electronic Devices and Flexcell International Corporation are advancing MEA technologies to enhance the relevance of in vitro research by providing a more physiologically accurate environment for cells.

In another special design, 60 electrodes are split into 6 × 5 arrays separated by 500 μm. Electrodes within a group are separated by 30 um with diameters of 10 μm. Arrays such as this are used to examine local responses of neurons while also studying functional connectivity of organotypic slices.

Spatial resolution is one of the key advantages of MEAs and allows signals sent over a long distance to be taken with higher precision when a high-density MEA is used. These arrays usually have a square grid pattern of 256 electrodes that cover an area of 2.8 by 2.8 mm.

Increased spatial resolution is provided by CMOS-based high-density microelectrode arrays featuring thousands of electrodes along with integrated readout and stimulation circuits on compact chips of the size of a thumbnail. Even the resolution of signals propagating along single axons has been demonstrated.

In order to obtain quality signals electrodes and tissue must be in close contact with one another. The perforated MEA design applies negative pressure to openings in the substrate so that tissue slices can be positioned on the electrodes to enhance contact and recorded signals.

A different approach to lower the electrode impedance is by modification of the interface material, for example by using carbon nanotubes, or by modification of the structure of the electrodes, with for example gold nanopillars or nanocavities.

While long-term extracellular in vitro recording of neural cells has been the main avenue of the CMOS MEA, its capacity has recently been extended to high-sensitivity multi-electrode intracellular in vitro recording of neural cells, complementing the long-term extracellular recording.

=== In vivo arrays ===
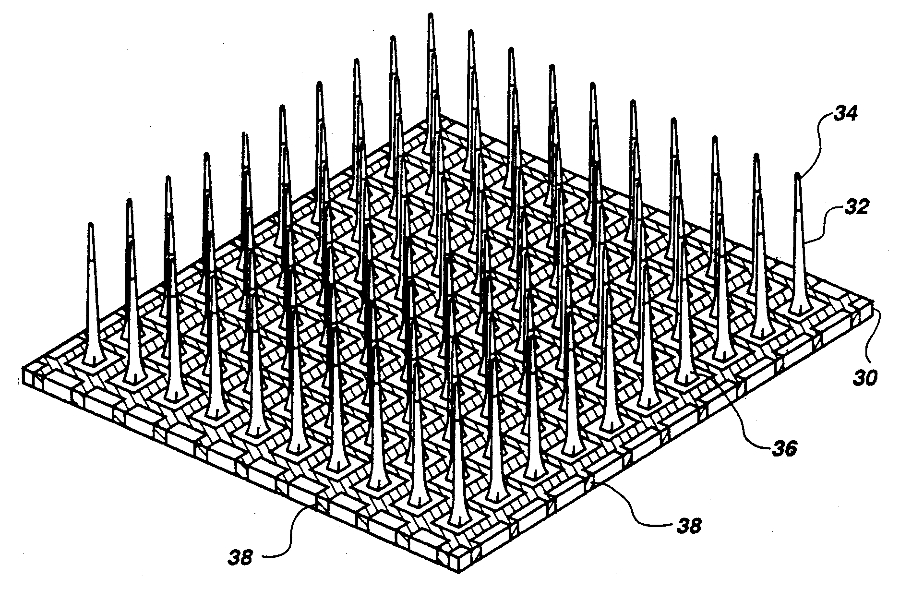
Schematic of the "Utah" in vivo electrode array

The three major categories of implantable MEAs are microwire, silicon-based, and flexible microelectrode arrays. Microwire MEAs are largely made of stainless steel or tungsten and they can be used to estimate the position of individual recorded neurons by triangulation. Silicon-based microelectrode arrays include two specific models: the Michigan and Utah arrays. Michigan arrays allow a higher density of sensors for implantation as well as a higher spatial resolution than microwire MEAs. They also allow signals to be obtained along the length of the shank, rather than just at the ends of the shanks. In contrast to Michigan arrays, Utah arrays are 3-D, consisting of 100 conductive silicon needles. However, in a Utah array, signals are only received from the tips of each electrode, which limits the amount of information that can be obtained at one time. Furthermore, Utah arrays are manufactured with set dimensions and parameters while the Michigan array allows for more design freedom. Flexible arrays, made with polyimide, parylene, or benzocyclobutene, provide an advantage over rigid microelectrode arrays because they provide a closer mechanical match, as the Young's modulus of silicon is much larger than that of brain tissue, contributing to shear-induced inflammation.

== Data processing methods ==
The fundamental unit of communication of neurons is, electrically, at least, the action potential. This all-or-nothing phenomenon originates at the axon hillock, resulting in a depolarization of the intracellular environment which propagates down the axon. This ion flux through the cellular membrane generates a sharp change in voltage in the extracellular environment, which is what the MEA electrodes ultimately detect. Thus, voltage spike counting and sorting is often used in research to characterize network activity. Spike train analysis, can also save processing time and computing memory compared to voltage measurements. Spike timestamps are identified as times where the voltage measured by an individual electrode exceeds a threshold (often defined by standard deviations from the mean of an inactive time period). These timestamps can be further processed to identify bursts(multiple spikes in close proximity). Further analysis of these trains can reveal spike organization and temporal patterns.

== Capabilities ==
=== Advantages ===
In general, the major strengths of in vitro arrays when compared to more traditional methods such as patch clamping include:

- Allowing the placement of multiple electrodes at once rather than individually
- The ability to set up controls within the same experimental setup (by using one electrode as a control and others as experimental). This is of particular interest in stimulation experiments.
- The ability to select different recordings sites within the array
- The ability to simultaneously receive data from multiple sites
- Recordings from intact retinae are of great interest because of the possibility of delivering real-time optical stimulation and, for instance, the possibility of reconstructing receptive fields.

Furthermore, in vitro arrays are non-invasive when compared to patch clamping because they do not require breaching of the cell membrane.

With respect to in vivo arrays however, the major advantage over patch clamping is the high spatial resolution. Implantable arrays allow signals to be obtained from individual neurons enabling information such as position or velocity of motor movement that can be used to control a prosthetic device. Large-scale, parallel recordings with tens of implanted electrodes are possible, at least in rodents, during animal behavior. This makes such extracellular recordings the method of choice to identify of neural circuits and to study their functions. Unambiguous identification of the recorded neuron using multi-electrode extracellular arrays, however, remains a problem to date.

=== Disadvantages ===
In vitro MEAs are less suited for recording and stimulating single cells due to their low spatial resolution compared to patch clamp and dynamic clamp systems. The complexity of signals an MEA electrode could effectively transmit to other cells is limited compared to the capabilities of dynamic clamps.

There are also several biological responses to implantation of a microelectrode array, particularly in regards to chronic implantation. Most notable among these effects are neuronal cell loss, glial scarring, and a drop in the number of functioning electrodes. The tissue response to implantation is dependent among many factors including size of the MEA shanks, distance between the shanks, MEA material composition, and time period of insertion. The tissue response is typically divided into short term and long term response. The short term response occurs within hours of implantation and begins with an increased population of astrocytes and glial cells surrounding the device. The recruited microglia then initiate inflammation and a process of phagocytosis of the foreign material begins. Over time, the astrocytes and microglia recruited to the device begin to accumulate, forming a sheath surrounding the array that extends tens of micrometres around the device. This not only increases the space between electrode probes, but also insulates the electrodes and increases impedance measurements. Problems with chronic implantation of arrays have been a driving force in the research of these devices. One novel study examined the neurodegenerative effects of inflammation caused by chronic implantation. Immunohistochemical markers showed a surprising presence of hyperphosphorylated tau, an indicator of Alzheimer's disease, near the electrode recording site. The phagocytosis of electrode material also brings into question the issue of a biocompatibility response, which research suggests has been minor and becomes almost nonexistent after 12 weeks in vivo. Research into minimizing the negative effects of device insertion includes surface coating of the devices with proteins that encourage neuron attachment, such as laminin, or drug eluting substances.

== Applications ==
=== In vitro ===
The nature of dissociated neuronal networks does not seem to change or diminish the character of its pharmacological response when compared to in vivo models, suggesting that MEAs can be used to study pharmacological effects on dissociated neuronal cultures in a more simple, controlled environment. A number of pharmacological studies using MEAs on dissociated neuronal networks, e.g. studies with ethanol. Interlaboratory validation has been conducted using MEAs.

In addition, a substantial body of work on various biophysical aspects of network function was carried out by reducing phenomena usually studied at the behavioral level to the dissociated cortical network level. For example, the capacity of such networks to extract spatial and temporal features of various input signals, dynamics of synchronization, sensitivity to neuromodulation and kinetics of learning using closed loop regimes. Finally, combining MEA technology with confocal microscopy allows for studying relationships between network activity and synaptic remodeling.

MEAs have been used to interface neuronal networks with non-biological systems as a controller. For example, a neural-computer interface can be created using MEAs. Dissociated rat cortical neurons were integrated into a closed stimulus-response feedback loop to control an animat in a virtual environment. A closed-loop stimulus-response system has also been constructed using an MEA by Potter, Mandhavan, and DeMarse, and by Mark Hammond, Kevin Warwick, and Ben Whalley in the University of Reading. About 300,000 dissociated rat neurons were plated on an MEA, which was connected to motors and ultrasound sensors on a robot, and was conditioned to avoid obstacles when sensed. Along these lines, Shimon Marom and colleagues in the Technion hooked dissociated neuronal networks growing on MEAs to a Lego Mindstorms robot; the visual field of the robot was classified by the network, and commands were delivered to the robot wheels such that it completely avoids bumping into obstacles. This "Braitenberg vehicle" was used to demonstrate the indeterminacy of reverse neuro-engineering showing that even in a simple setup with practically unlimited access to every piece of relevant information, it was impossible to deduce with certainty the specific neural coding scheme that was used to drive the robots behavior.

MEAs have been used to observe network firing in hippocampal slices.

=== In vivo ===
There are several implantable interfaces that are currently available for consumer use including deep brain stimulators, cochlear implants, and cardiac pacemakers. Deep brain stimulation (DBS) has been effective at treating movement disorders such as Parkinson's disease, and cochlear implants have helped many to improve their hearing by assisting stimulation of the auditory nerve. Because of their remarkable potential, MEAs are a prominent area of neuroscience research. Research suggests that MEAs may provide insight into processes such as memory formation and perception and may also hold therapeutic value for conditions such as epilepsy, depression, and obsessive-compulsive disorder. Clinical trials using interface devices for restoring motor control after spinal cord injury or as treatment for ALS have been initiated in a project entitled BrainGate (see video demo: BrainGate). MEAs provide the high resolution necessary to record time varying signals, giving them the ability to be used to both control and obtain feedback from prosthetic devices, as was shown by Kevin Warwick, Mark Gasson and Peter Kyberd. Research suggests that MEA use may be able to assist in the restoration of vision by stimulating the optic pathway.

== MEA user meetings ==
A biannual scientific user meeting is held in Reutlingen, organized by the Natural and Medical Sciences Institute (NMI) at the University of Tübingen. The meetings offer a comprehensive overview of all aspects related to new developments and current applications of Microelectrode Arrays in basic and applied neuroscience as well as in industrial drug discovery, safety pharmacology and neurotechnology. The biannual conference has developed into an international venue for scientists developing and using MEAs from both industry and academia, and is recognized as an information-packed scientific forum of high quality. The meeting contributions are available as open access proceeding books.

== Use in art ==
In addition to being used for scientific purposes, MEAs have been used in contemporary art to investigate philosophical questions about the relationship between technology and biology. Traditionally within Western thought, biology and technology have been separated into two distinct categories: bios and technê. In 2002, MEART: The Semi-living Artist was created as a collaborative art and science project between SymbioticA at the University of Western Australia in Perth, and the Potter Lab at the Georgia Institute of Technology in Atlanta, to question the relationship between biology and technology. MEART consisted of rat cortical neurons grown in vitro on an MEA in Atlanta, a pneumatic robot arm capable of drawing with pens on paper in Perth, and software to govern communications between the two. Signals from the neurons were relayed in a closed-loop between Perth and Atlanta as the MEA stimulated the pneumatic arm. MEART was first exhibited to the public in the exhibition Biofeel at the Perth Institute of Contemporary Arts in 2002.

== See also ==
- Animat
- Artificial cardiac pacemaker
- Deep brain stimulation
- Patch clamp
- Bioelectronics
- Ultramicroelectrode
