= Stretchable microelectrode array =

Device in neurophysiology

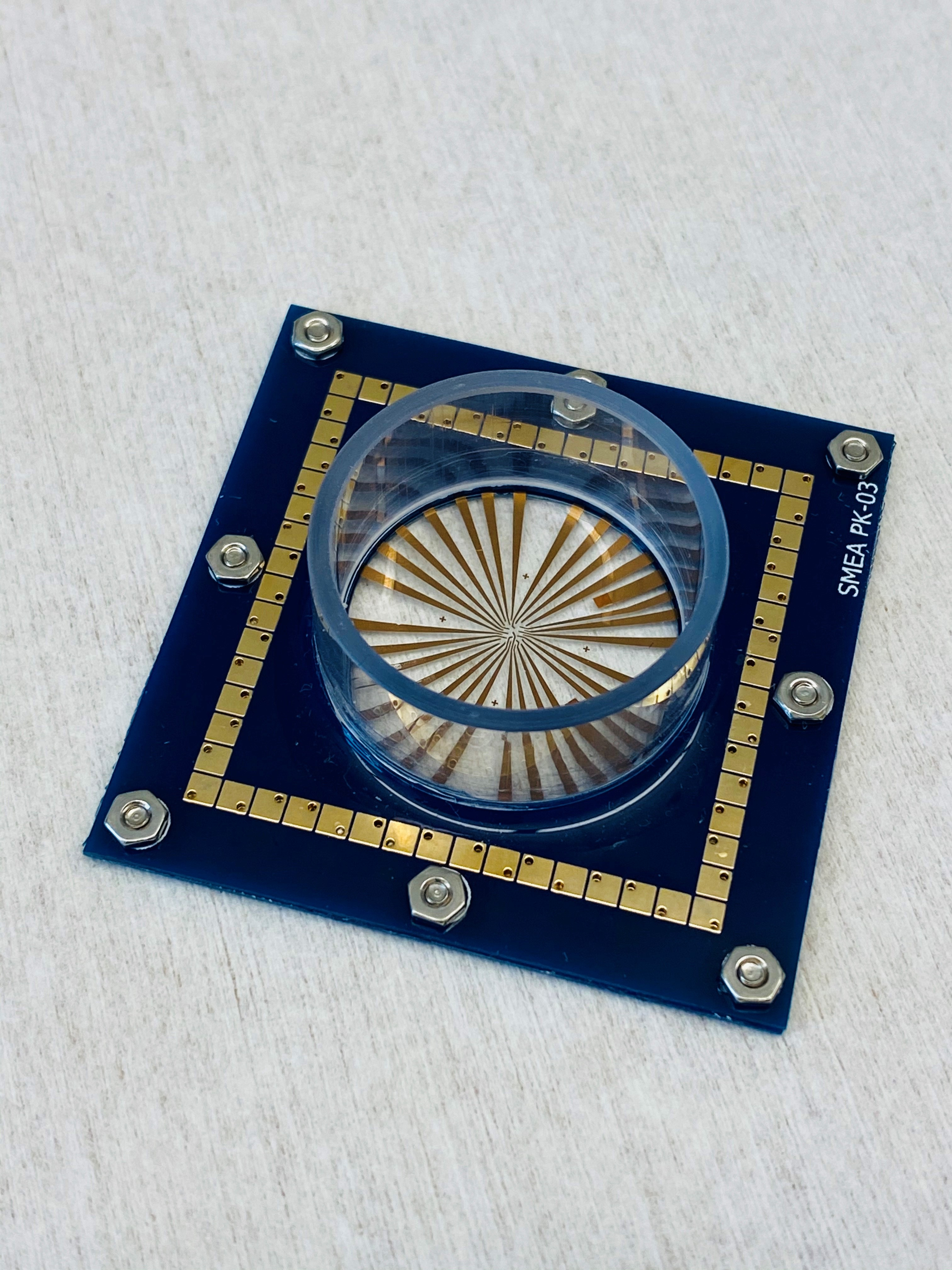
Stretchable microelectrode array (sMEA)

Stretchable microelectrode arrays (stretchable MEAs or sMEAs) (also referred to as stretchable multielectrode arrays) are a specialized type of microelectrode array (MEA) with a key advantage; they can be deformed, stretched, bent, and twisted while maintaining electrical functionality whereas standard MEAs break upon mechanical loading. Flexible MEAs (flexMEA), which are often confounded with stretchable MEAs, lie in between stretchable MEAs and standard MEA in terms of their mechanical properties because they bend and twist to some degree, but not stretch. Just like traditional MEAs, stretchable MEAs consist of a few thousand microelectrodes that allow recording or stimulation of electrical signals from cells (neurons, muscles, etc.), and are used in vivo in a living being or in vitro with cell cultures.

== Theory ==
A stretchable conductor typically consists of two components: an elastomeric insulator and an electrical conductor. There are several approaches to producing stretchable and electrical conducting materials that fall into two categories: structural design and material innovation.

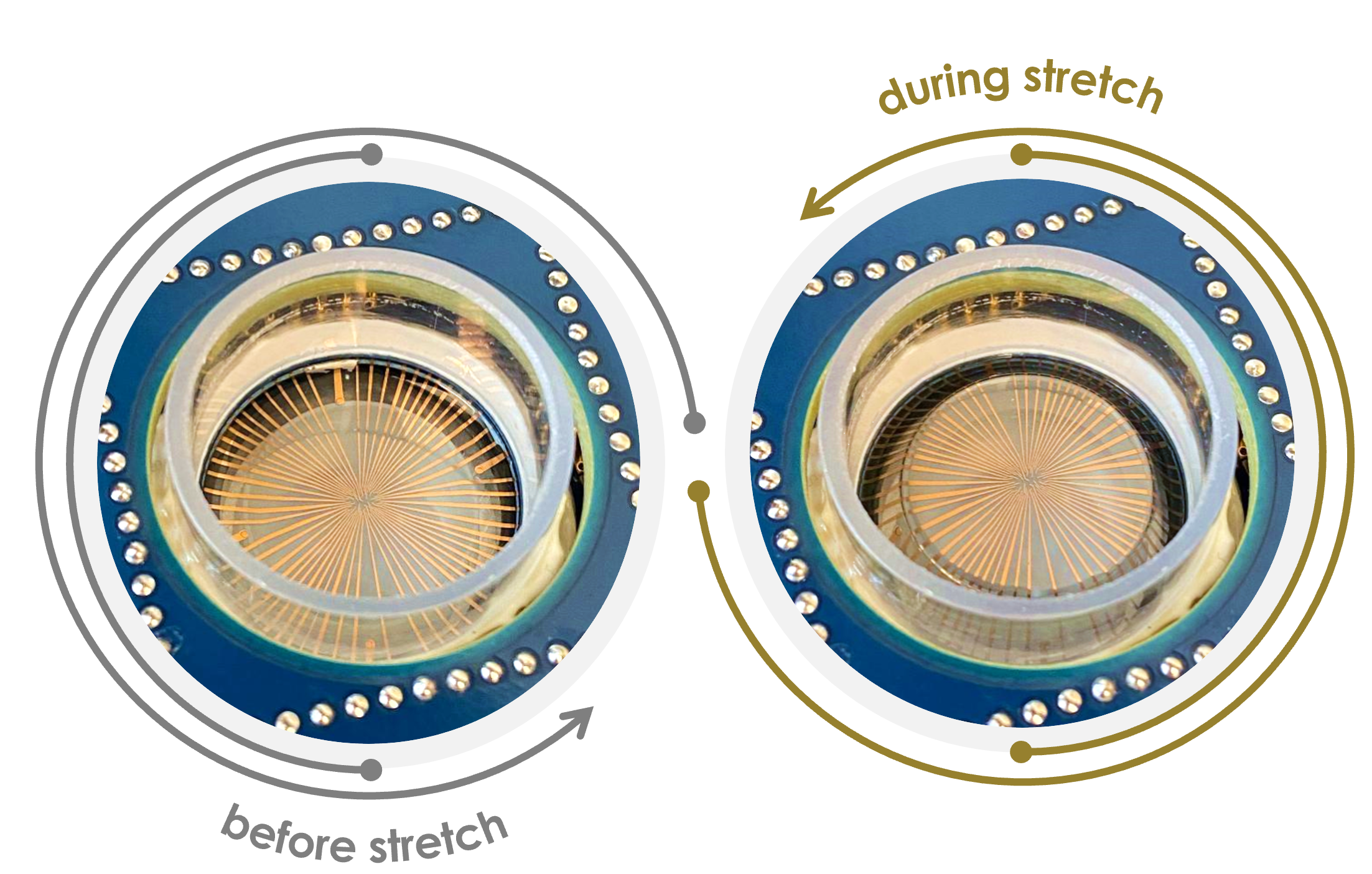
sMEA before and during stretch

=== Material innovation ===
- Electronic Fillers: This is the oldest approach to making an elastomeric material elastically stretchable. In principle, rigid and electrically conductive materials and mixed with an elastomeric polymer before curing to create stretchable composites. If the concentration of the electrically conductive filler is high enough they form a mesh-like percolation network that facilitates the free movement of charge carriers (ions, electrons) through contact junctions. The minimum concentration of the electronic filler material that is required to create conductive pathways for charge carrier transport through the elastomer is called the percolation threshold. The percolation threshold is usually indicated as weight percentage (wt%) or volume percentage (vol%) of the filler material, and ranges from less than 1wt% for high aspect ration carbon nanotubes to over 15wt%. The type of filler materials ranges from metals in powder or nanowire form, carbon as graphite or nanotubes, to electrically conducting polymers.
- 'Wavy' Nanowires and Nanoribbons: The spontaneous formation of wavy patterns of aligned buckles that is caused by the deposition of a thin gold film on the surface of the elastomer polydimethylsiloxane (PDMS) was first described by the group of George Whitesides at Harvard University in 2000. The gold was deposited on warmed PDMS (100 °C), and, upon cooling and the associated thermal shrinkage of the elastomer, the gold film comes under compressive stress which is relieved by creating buckles. In subsequent years, the group of John Rogers at the University of Urbana Champaign (now at Northwestern University) has developed the technology to bond very thin silicon ribbons to a pre-stretched PDMS membrane. Upon relaxation of the per-stretch, the compressive mechanical stress in the silicon ribbons is relieved by creating wavy buckles in the PDMS. As silicon is a brittle material, the ribbons need to very thin (about 100 nm) to stay intact during buckling.
- Liquid Metals: A metal or alloy that is liquid at room temperature can be enclosed in PDMS and used as a stretchable conductor. Mercury is the only pure metal that is liquid at room temperature but has limited application due to its neurotoxicity. Cesium melts at 28.5 °C, but reacts violently when exposed to air and is therefore not suitable for this application. Most researchers therefore use an eutectic mixture of Indium and Gallium, so called EGaIn, which has a melting point is 15.7 °C and consists of 75.5% Gallium and 24.5% Indium. A eutectic mixture of Ga (68.5%), In (21.5%) and Sn (10.0%), also known as Galinstan, is another popular choice and has a melting point of 10.5 °C.
- Microcracked gold thin film: When a thin gold film is deposited on PDMS under certain conditions, the gold film adopts a microcracked morphology which makes the gold stretchable. The maximum strain of the film decreases with the length and increases with the width of the conductor.

=== Structural design ===
- Geometric patterning, fractal patterns: Metal traces are deposited in specific patterns, such as meandering or serpentine shapes, within a stretchable elastomeric substrate to accommodate strain. The resulting structure is akin to a 2-dimensional spring. The University of Ghent and IMEC in Belgium have pioneered the approach to using Meander shaped metallic structures.
  - The group of John Rogers increased the maximum strain in devices created by this approach using fractal-based structures. These fractal patterns are characterized by self-similarity, i.e., a small sections of the structure yields pieces with geometries that resemble the whole structure.
  - These fractal patterns include (i) Koch, Peano, Hilbert lines, (ii) Moore, Vicsek loops, and (iii) Greek crosses.
- Origami-inspired structures, and kirigami cuts: Intrinsically rigid or inelastic flexible materials can be turned into stretchable materials by applying origami technology and kirigami cuts.

== History ==
The first time the term stretchable multielectrode array (sMEA)

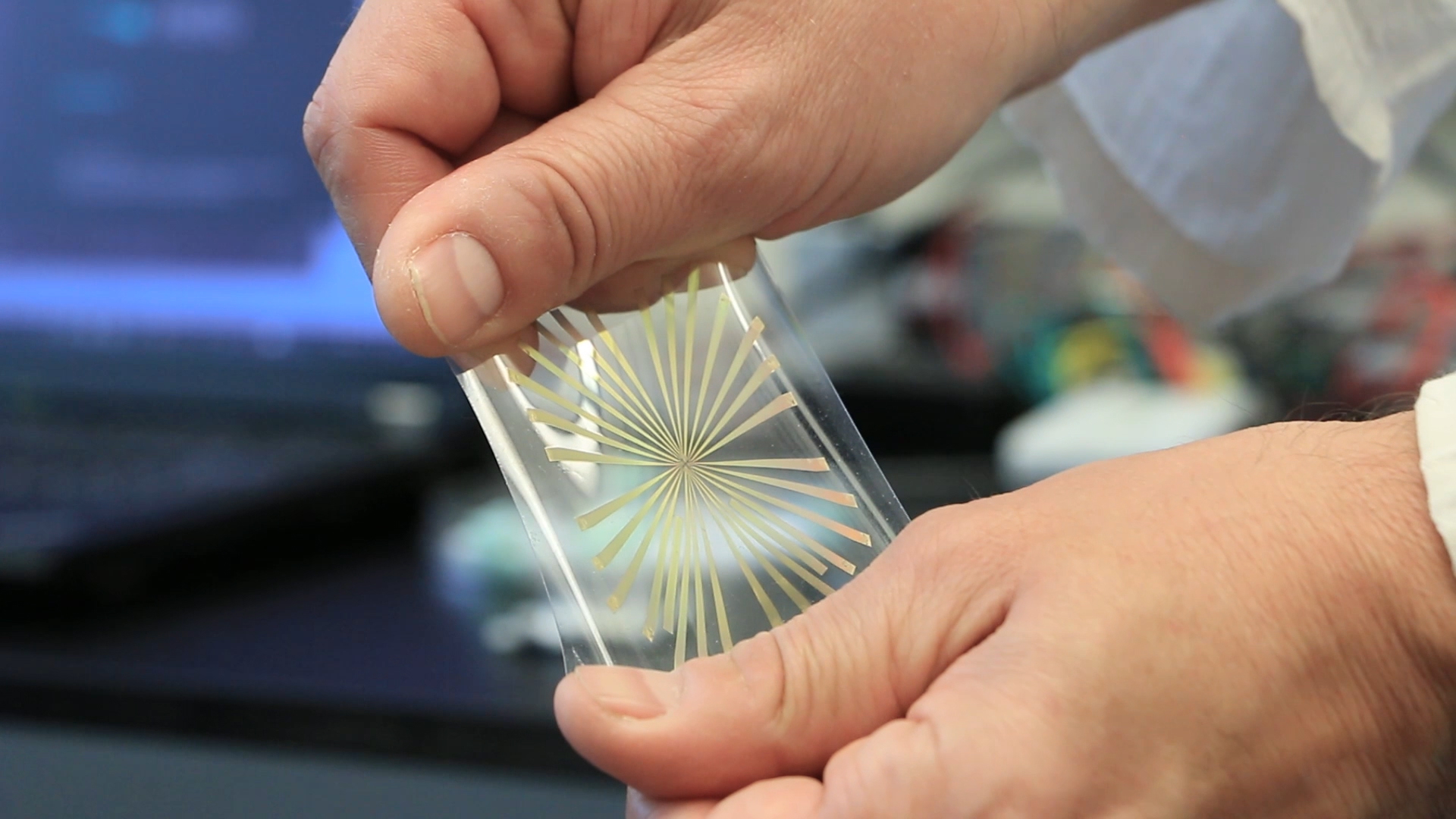
Manually stretching sMEA

Understanding how cells convert mechanical stimuli appeared in the literature was in a conference proceeding in 2002 from the Lawrence Livermore National Laboratory. This paper described the fabrication of an sMEA for a retinal prosthesis, but no biological material was used, i.e., functionality to record or stimulate neural activity was not attempted. The first description of sMEAs being used to record neural activity in biological samples was in 2006 when the research group of Barclay Morrison at Columbia University and Sigurd Wagner at Princeton University reported recording of spontaneous activity in organotypic hippocampal tissue slices. Neither the electrodes nor the tissue appears to have been stretched in these experiments. In 2008, a paper from the Georgia Institute of Technology and Emory University described the use of sMEAs in stimulating a explant of a rat spinal cord. The sMEA was wrapped around the spinal cord, but not stretched, and the cells were electrically stimulated but not used in recording electrophysiological activity. In 2009, another paper of the Morrison/Wagner groups described for the first time the use of an sMEA with a biological sample being stretched as well as electrical stimulation and recording of electrophysiological activity being carried out before and after stretching.

In subsequent years, the number of research papers that describes different approaches to fabricating sMEAs and their use for in vitro and in vivo research has increased immensely.

== Types and capabilities ==
Stretchable microelectrode arrays (sMEAs) can be categorized whether they are used with cells or tissue slices in a dish (in vitro) or whether they are implanted in an animal or human (in vivo).

=== In vitro stretchable MEAs ===
sMEAs are used in vitro to record and stimulate electrophysiological activity in dissociated cells, tissue slices or organoids. In vitro use of sMEAs may include stretching of the cells. The cells are either harvested from an animal or were derived from human induced pluripotent stem cells (hiPSCs).

The form factor of sMEAs is often similar to rigid MEAs because the same data acquisition systems can be used for both types of MEAs. The main differences between sMEAs and rigid MEAs are summarized below:

- Number of microelectrodes:sMEAs usually have 60 or less microelectrodes whereas rigid MEAs have 60 electrodes in the standard configuration but can have several thousand electrodes in CMOS devices.
- Diameter of the recording sites: The recording site diameter is typically 50-100μm for sMEAs and 10-30 μm for glass MEAs, but can be less than 10μm in CMOS MEAs.
- Spacing between microelectrodes: The spacing between microelectrodes (center-to-center) is typically larger than 300μm for sMEAs and 200 μm for glass MEAs. but can be less than 20μm in CMOS MEAs.

The reason for these differences is that sMEAs are fabricated using soft elastomeric materials such as PDMS as substrate and encapsulation which have a much higher coefficient of thermal expansion and lower Young's Modulus than rigid MEAs that are built on glass, plastic or silicon (CMOS) substrates. These properties make it more challenging to align and bond small features. In addition, the maximum strain that the electrodes can tolerate decreases for narrower electrodes, which is why the electrodes leads are often wide, thus limiting the number electrodes. sMEAs for in vitro applications are only available commercially from BioMedical Sustainable Elastic Electronic Devices.

==== Advantages ====
There are several benefits of using soft and stretchable MEAs instead of traditional rigid or merely flexible MEAs. With traditional MEAs, the cells are grown on a rigid substrate material such as glass or plastic. This environment is very different from the natural environment of the cells in the body, which causes the cells to behave differently in vitro than in their natural environment in vivo. This is a major issue for the use of rigid MEAs for pre-clinical research because the goal of pre-clinical research is to predict treatment outcomes in humans. The advantages of using sMEAs for pre-clinical research are twofold. First, the stiffness of the substrate that the cells are grown on matches more closely the stiffness of the cellular environment in the body. Second, sMEAs enable the application of biomechanical cues to the cells, which affect cellular function and behavior. Both of these advantages reduce the mismatch of the environment of cells in vitro and in human body, i.e., the cells behave more similarly in vitro as they do in vivo, which improves the value of pre-clinical research to predict clinical outcomes, thus potentially reducing the failure rate of clinical trials (now >95%).

==== Disadvantage ====
The main disadvantage of sMEAs compared to rigid MEAs are related to the different technologies that are used to manufacture these devices. sMEAs have usually up to 60 electrodes with diameters of between 50μm and 100μm where rigid CMOS based MEAs can have thousands of electrodes with diameters of 10μm. This means that sMEAs are not suitable for studying sub-cellular structures.

=== In vivo stretchable MEAs ===
Stretchable MEAs have many benefits for implantable in vivo applications for recording and stimulation of electrophysiological activity from electrogenic biological tissues (most commonly neurons and muscles). Some applications involve only recording of electrophysiological activity, e.g., on the surface of the brain, the spinal cord, some involve only stimulation of electrophysiological activity, and some both.

==== Advantages ====
The main benefits of using sMEAs for in vivo applications are twofold. First, they can conform to the dynamic and often curved surfaces of biological tissues. Second, sMEAs cause significant smaller foreign body reaction than rigid MEAs because of the reduced mismatch in mechanical properties (stiffness) between the implant the tissue.

==== Disadvantage ====
The main disadvantage of sMEAs for implanted applications is the mechanical robustness compared to rigid MEAs, which can cause the implant to break or tear.

== Applications ==
=== Neural interfaces ===
In neural interfaces, sMEAs are utilized to record and stimulate neural activity. Their stretchability allows them to conform to the brain's surface or penetrate neural tissue without causing significant damage. This improves the quality of neural recordings and the effectiveness of neural stimulation, which is crucial for applications such as brain-machine interfaces.

=== Electrocorticography ===
Electrocorticography (EcoG) with stretchable MEAs offers a less invasive method for recording electrical activity from the brain's surface. These arrays can conform to the cortical surface, providing high-resolution, stable recordings even during brain movements. This capability is essential for applications such as epilepsy monitoring and brain-computer interfaces.

=== Cardiac monitoring ===
sMEAs are employed in cardiac monitoring and therapy. They can be wrapped around the heart to monitor electrical activity or deliver therapeutic electrical impulses. Their flexibility ensures they remain in contact with the heart's surface despite its constant motion. This application is vital for detecting and treating arrhythmias and other cardiac conditions, providing real-time monitoring and precise intervention.

=== In vitro research ===
sMEAs are used in in vitro research to study cellular responses under various mechanical conditions. They enable the monitoring and stimulation of cells in a controlled environment, providing insights into cellular behavior and disease mechanisms. This application is particularly useful in drug testing and the development of new therapies.

=== Soft robotics ===
In soft robotics, sMEAs create sensors and actuators that can deform in response to external forces. These applications utilize the mechanical resilience and electrical functionality of sMEAs to develop robots capable of navigating complex environments and performing delicate tasks. Soft robotic systems equipped with sMEAs can adapt to various tasks, from medical procedures to industrial automation.

== Conclusion ==
Stretchable microelectrode arrays represent an advancement in biomedical engineering, with potential applications in neural interfaces, cardiac monitoring, in vitro research, and soft robotics. Research and development efforts continue to focus on overcoming existing challenges to fully realize the potential of these devices.
