= Kevin Warwick =

British engineer and robotics researcher

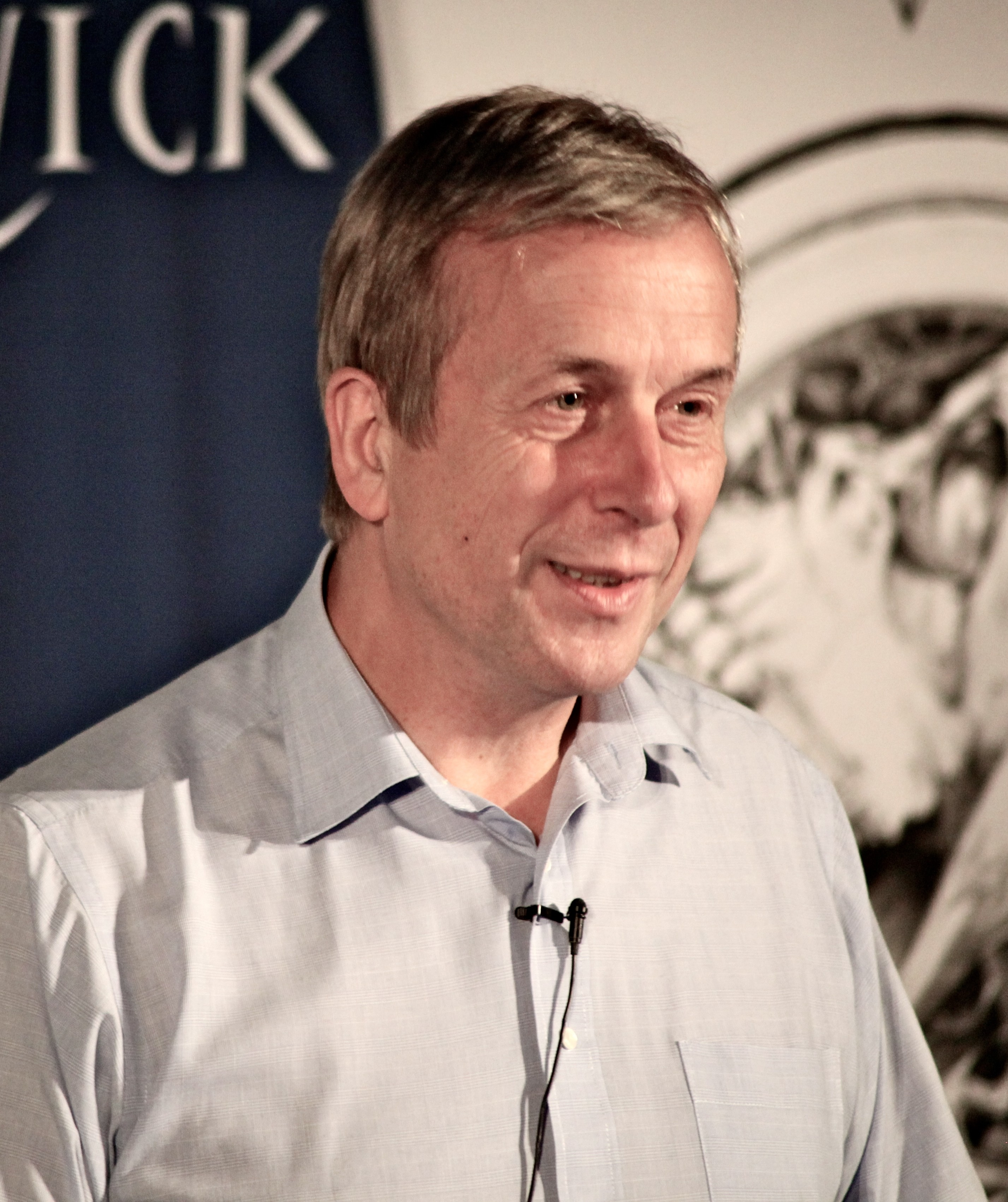
- Warwick in 2011
- Born: 9 February 1954 (age 72); Coventry, England
- Other name: "Captain Cyborg"
- Education: Aston University (BSc); Imperial College London (PhD)
- Known for: Project Cyborg
- Awards: FIET; Royal Institution Christmas Lectures (2000); Mountbatten Medal (2008); Ellison-Cliffe Medal (2011)
- Scientific career
- Fields: Biomedical engineering; Artificial Intelligence (AI); Bioethics; Cybernetics; Cyborgs
- Workplaces: Somerville College, University of Oxford; Newcastle University; University of Warwick; University of Reading; Coventry University
- Thesis: Self-tuning controllers via the state space (1982)
- Doctoral advisor: John Hugh Westcott
- Doctoral students: Mark Gasson

Kevin Warwick (born 9 February 1954) is an English engineer and was Deputy Vice-Chancellor (Research) at Coventry University. He is known for his studies on direct interfaces between computer systems and the human nervous system, and has also done research concerning robotics.

== Biography ==
Kevin Warwick was born in 1954 in Keresley, Coventry, England, and was raised in the nearby village of Ryton-on-Dunsmore, Warwickshire. His family attended a Methodist church but soon he began doubting the existence of God. He attended Lawrence Sheriff School in Rugby, Warwickshire, where he was a contemporary of actor Arthur Bostrom. He left school at the age of 16 to start an apprenticeship with British Telecom. In 1976, he was granted his first degree at Aston University, followed by a PhD and a research job at Imperial College London.

He took up positions at Somerville College in Oxford, Newcastle University, the University of Warwick, and the University of Reading, before relocating to Coventry University in 2014.

Warwick is a Chartered Engineer (CEng), a Fellow of the Institution of Engineering and Technology (FIET) and a Fellow of the City and Guilds of London Institute (FCGI). He was visiting professor at the Czech Technical University in Prague, the University of Strathclyde, Bournemouth University, and the University of Reading, and in 2004 he was Senior Beckman Fellow at the University of Illinois in the United States.

By the age of 40, Warwick had been awarded a DSc degree by both Imperial College London and the Czech Academy of Sciences in Prague, for his research output in two unrelated areas. He has received the IET Achievement Medal, the IET Mountbatten Medal, and in 2011 the Ellison-Cliffe Medal from the Royal Society of Medicine. In 2000, Warwick presented the Royal Institution Christmas Lectures, entitled The Rise of Robots.

== Research ==
Warwick performs research in artificial intelligence, biomedical engineering, control systems and robotics. Much of Warwick's early research was in the area of discrete time adaptive control. He introduced the first state space based self-tuning controller and unified discrete time state space representations of ARMA models. He has also contributed to mathematics, power engineering and manufacturing production machinery.

=== Artificial intelligence ===
Warwick directed a research project funded by the Engineering and Physical Sciences Research Council (EPSRC), which investigated the use of machine learning and artificial intelligence (AI) techniques to suitably stimulate and translate patterns of electrical activity from living cultured neural networks to use the networks for the control of mobile robots. Hence the behaviour process for each robot was effectively provided by a biological brain.

Previously, Warwick helped to develop a genetic algorithm named Gershwyn, which was able to exhibit creativity in producing popular songs, learning what makes a hit record by listening to examples of previous successful songs. Gershwyn appeared on BBC's Tomorrow's World, having been successfully used to mix music for Manus, a group consisting of the four younger brothers of Elvis Costello.

Another of Warwick's projects involving AI was the robot head, Morgui. The head, which contained five "senses" (vision, sound, infrared, ultrasound and radar), was used to investigate sensor data fusion. It was X-rated by the University of Reading Research and Ethics Committee due to its image storage capabilities—anyone under the age of 18 who wished to interact with the robot had to obtain parental approval.

Warwick has very outspoken opinions about the future, particularly with respect to AI and its effect on the human species. He argues that humanity will need to use technology to enhance itself to avoid being overtaken by machines. He states that many human limitations, such as sensorimotor abilities, can be outperformed by machines, and he has said on record that he wants to gain these abilities: "There is no way I want to stay a mere human."

=== Bioethics ===
Warwick directed the University of Reading team in a number of European Community projects such as: FIDIS (Future of Identity in the Information Society), researching the future of identity; and ETHICBOTS and RoboLaw, both of which considered the ethical aspects of robots and cyborgs.

Warwick's topics of interest have many ethical implications, some due to his human enhancement experiments. The ethical dilemmas of his research are used by the Institute of Physics as a case study for schoolchildren and science teachers as a part of their formal Advanced level and GCSE studies. His work has also been discussed by the USA President's Council on Bioethics and the USA President's Panel on Forward Engagements. He is a member of the Nuffield Council on Bioethics Working Party on Novel Neurotechnologies.

=== Deep brain stimulation ===
Along with Tipu Aziz and his team at John Radcliffe Hospital, Oxford, and John Stein of the University of Oxford, Warwick is helping to design the next generation of deep brain stimulation for Parkinson's disease. Instead of stimulating the brain all the time, the goal is for the device to predict when stimulation is needed and to apply the signals prior to any tremors occurring, thereby stopping tremors before they start. Recent results have also shown that it is possible to identify different types of Parkinson's Disease.

=== Public awareness ===
Warwick has directed a number of projects intended to interest schoolchildren in the technology with which he is involved. In 2000, he received the EPSRC Millennium Award for his Schools Robot League. In 2007, 16 school teams were involved in a project to design a humanoid robot to dance and then complete an assault course, with the final competition staged at the Science Museum, London. The project, entitled 'Androids Advance' was funded by EPSRC and was presented as a news item by Chinese television.

Warwick contributes significantly to the public understanding of science by giving regular public lectures, participating with radio programmes, and through popular writing. He has appeared in numerous television documentary programmes on AI, robotics and the role of science fiction in science, such as How William Shatner Changed the World, Future Fantastic and Explorations. He also appeared in the Ray Kurzweil-inspired movie Transcendent Man along with William Shatner, Colin Powell, and Stevie Wonder. He has guested on several television talk shows, including Late Night with Conan O'Brien, Først & sist, Sunday Brunch and Richard & Judy. He has appeared on the cover of a number of magazines, for example the February 2000 edition of Wired.

In 2005, Warwick was the subject of an early day motion tabled by members of the UK Parliament, in which he was congratulated for his work in attracting students to science and for teaching "in a way that makes the subject interesting and relevant so that more students will want to develop a career in science."

In 2009, Warwick was interviewed about his work in cybernetics for two documentary features on the DVD release of the 1985 Doctor Who story Attack of the Cybermen. He was also an interview subject for the televised lecture The Science of Doctor Who in 2013.

In 2013, Warwick appeared as a guest on BBC Radio 4's The Museum of Curiosity with Robert Llewellyn and Cleo Rocos. In 2014, he appeared on BBC Radio 4's Midweek with Libby Purves, Roger Bannister and Rachael Stirling.

=== Robotics ===
Warwick's claims that robots can program themselves to avoid each other while operating in a group raise the issue of self-organisation. In particular, the works of Francisco Varela and Humberto Maturana, once purely speculative have now become immediately relevant with respect to synthetic intelligence.

Cyborg-type systems, if they are to survive, need to be not only homeostatic (meaning that they are able to preserve stable internal conditions in various environments) but also adaptive. Testing the claims of Varela and Maturana using synthetic devices is the more serious concern in the discussion about Warwick and those involved in similar research. "Pulling the plug" on independent devices cannot be as simple as it appears, because if the device displays sufficient intelligence, and assumes a diagnostic and prognostic stature, we may ultimately one day be forced to decide between what it could be telling us as counterintuitive (but correct) and our impulse to disconnect because of our limited and "intuitive" perceptions.

Warwick's robots seemed to exhibit behaviour not anticipated by the research, one such robot "committing suicide" because it could not cope with its environment. In a more complex setting, it may be asked whether a "natural selection" might be possible, neural networks being the major operative.

The 1999 edition of the Guinness Book of Records recorded that Warwick performed the first robot learning experiment using the Internet. One robot, with an artificial neural network brain at the University of Reading in the UK, learned how to move around without bumping into things. It then taught, via the Internet, another robot at SUNY Buffalo in New York State to behave in the same way. The robot in the US was therefore not taught or programmed by a human, but rather by another robot based on what it had itself learnt.

Hissing Sid was a robot cat that Warwick took on a British Council lecture tour of Russia, where he presented it in lectures at such places as Moscow State University. The robot was put together as a student project; its name came from the noise made by the pneumatic actuators used to drive its legs when walking. Hissing Sid also appeared on BBC TV's Blue Peter, but became better known when it was refused a ticket by British Airways on the grounds that they did not allow animals in the cabin.

Warwick was also responsible for a robotic "magic chair" (based on the SCARA-form UMI RTX arm) used on BBC TV's Jim'll Fix It. The chair provided the show's host Jimmy Savile with tea and stored Jim'll Fix It badges for him to hand out to guests. Warwick appeared on the programme himself for a Fix-it involving robots.

Warwick was also involved in the development of the "Seven Dwarves" robots, a version of which was sold in kit form as "Cybot" on the cover of Real Robots magazine in 2001. The magazine series guided its readers through the stages of building and programming Cybot, an artificially intelligent robot capable of making its own decisions and thinking for itself.

=== Project Cyborg ===
Probably the most famous research undertaken by Warwick—and the origin of the nickname "Captain Cyborg" given to him by The Register—is the set of experiments known as Project Cyborg, in which an array was implanted into his arm, with the goal of him "becoming a cyborg".

The first stage of Project Cyborg, which began on 24 August 1998, involved a simple RFID transmitter being implanted beneath Warwick's skin, which was used to control doors, lights, heaters, and other computer-controlled devices based on his proximity. He explained that the main purpose of this experiment was to test the limits of what the body would accept, and how easy it would be to receive a meaningful signal from the microprocessor.

The second stage of the research involved a more complex neural interface, designed and built especially for the experiment by Dr. Mark Gasson and his team at the University of Reading. This device consisted of a BrainGate sensor, a silicon square about 3mm wide, connected to an external "gauntlet" that housed supporting electronics. It was implanted under local anaesthetic on 14 March 2002 at the Radcliffe Infirmary in Oxford, where it was interfaced directly into Warwick's nervous system via the median nerve in his left wrist. The microelectrode array that was inserted contained 100 electrodes, each the width of a human hair, of which 25 could be accessed at any one time, whereas the nerve that was being monitored carries many times that number of signals. The experiment proved successful, and the output signals were detailed enough to enable a robot arm, developed by Warwick's colleague Dr. Peter Kyberd, to mimic the actions of Warwick's own arm.

By means of the implant, Warwick's nervous system was connected to the Internet at Columbia University, New York. From there he was able to control the robot arm at the University of Reading and obtain feedback from sensors in the finger tips. He also successfully connected ultrasonic sensors on a baseball cap and experienced a form of extrasensory input.

In a highly publicised extension to the experiment, a simpler array was implanted into the arm of Warwick's wife, with the ultimate aim of one day creating a form of telepathy or empathy using the Internet to communicate the signal over huge distances. This experiment resulted in the first direct and purely electronic communication between the nervous systems of two humans. Finally, the effect of the implant on Warwick's hand function was measured using the University of Southampton's Hand Assessment Procedure (SHAP). There was a fear that directly interfacing with the nervous system might cause some form of damage or interference, but no measurable side effect (nor any sign of rejection) was encountered.

==== Implications ====
Warwick and his colleagues claim that the Project Cyborg research could result in new medical tools for treating patients with damage to the nervous system, as well as assisting the more ambitious enhancements Warwick advocates. Some transhumanists even speculate that similar technologies could be used for technology-facilitated telepathy.

=== Tracking device ===
A controversy began in August 2002, shortly after the Soham murders, when Warwick reportedly offered to implant a tracking device into an 11-year-old girl as an anti-abduction measure. The plan produced a mixed reaction, with endorsement from many worried parents but ethical concerns from children's societies. As a result, the idea did not go ahead.

Anti-theft RFID chips are common in jewellery or clothing in some Latin American countries due to a high abduction rate, and the company VeriChip announced plans in 2001 to expand its line of available medical information implants, to be GPS trackable when combined with a separate GPS device.

=== Turing test ===
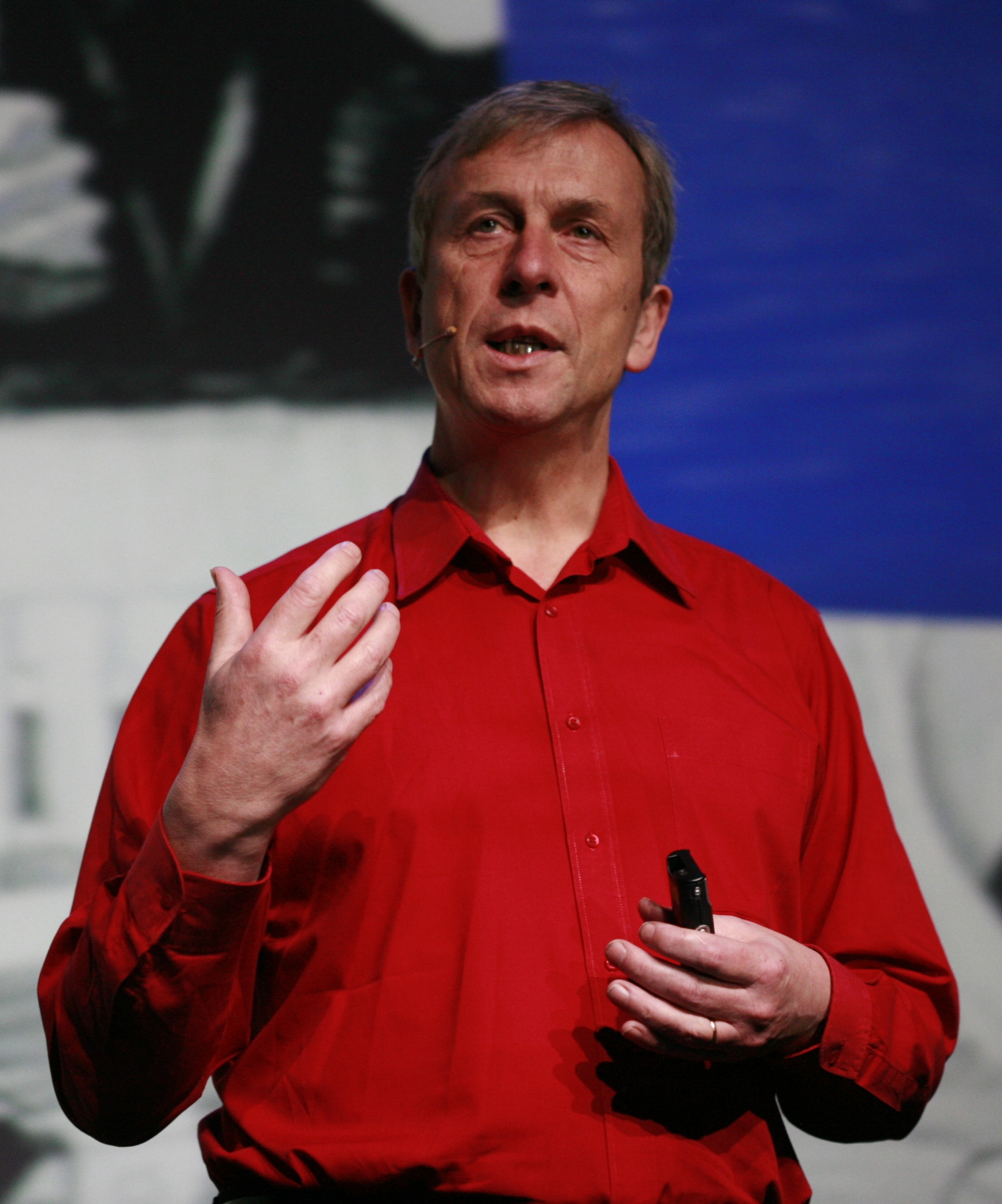
Warwick in February 2008

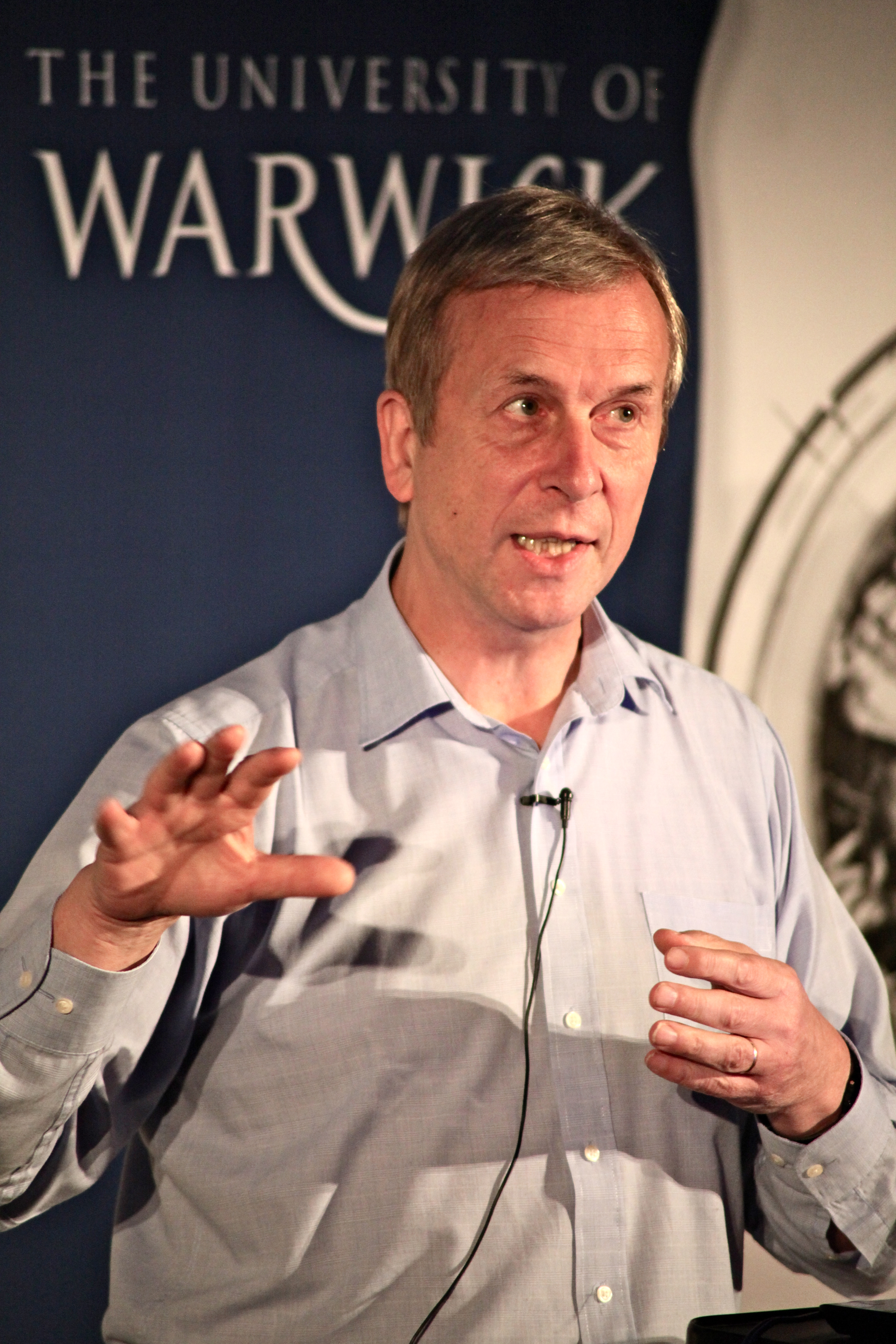
Warwick in June 2011

Warwick participated as a Turing Interrogator on two occasions, judging machines in the 2001 and 2006 Loebner Prize competitions, platforms for an "imitation game" as devised by Alan Turing. The 2001 Prize, held at the London Science Museum, featured Turing's "jury service" or one-to-one Turing tests and was won by A.L.I.C.E. The 2006 contest staged "parallel-paired" Turing tests at University College London and the winner was Rollo Carpenter. Warwick co-organised the 2008 Loebner Prize at the University of Reading, which also featured parallel-paired Turing tests.

In 2012, he co-organised with Huma Shah a series of Turing tests held at Bletchley Park. According to Warwick, the tests strictly adhered to the statements made by Alan Turing in his papers. Warwick himself participated in the tests as a hidden human. Results of the tests were discussed in a number of academic papers. One paper, entitled "Human Misidentification in Turing Tests", became one of the top three most-downloaded papers in the Journal of Experimental and Theoretical Artificial Intelligence.

In June 2014, Warwick helped Shah stage a series of Turing tests to mark the 60th anniversary of Alan Turing's death. The event was performed at the Royal Society, London. Warwick regarded the winning chatbot, "Eugene Goostman", as having "passed the Turing test for the first time" by fooling a third of the event's judges into making an incorrect identification, and termed this a "milestone". A paper containing all of the transcripts involving Eugene Goostman entitled "Can Machines Think? A Report on Turing Test Experiments at the Royal Society", has also become one of the top three most-downloaded papers in the Journal of Experimental and Theoretical Artificial Intelligence.

Warwick was criticised in the context of the 2014 Royal Society event, where he claimed that software program Eugene Goostman had passed the Turing test on the basis of its performance. The software successfully convinced over 30% of the judges who could not identify it as being a machine, on the basis of a five-minute text chat. Critics stated that the software's claim of being a young non-native English speaker weakened the spirit of the test, as any grammatical and semantic inconsistencies could be excused as a consequence of limited proficiency in the English language. Some critics also claimed that the software's performance had been exceeded by other programs in the past. However, the 2014 tests were entirely unrestricted in terms of discussion topics, whereas the previous tests referenced by the critics had been limited to very specific subject areas. Additionally, Warwick was criticised by editor and entrepreneur Mike Masnick for exaggerating the significance of the Eugene Goostman program to the press.

== Other work ==
Warwick was a member of the 2001 Higher Education Funding Council for England (unit 29) Research Assessment Exercise panel on Electrical and Electronic Engineering and was deputy chairman for the same panel (unit 24) in 2008. In March 2009, he was cited as being the inspiration of National Young Scientist of the Year, Peter Hatfield.

=== Royal Institution Christmas Lectures ===
Warwick presented the Royal Institution Christmas Lectures in December 2000, entitled Rise of the Robots. Although the lectures were well received by some, British computer scientist Simon Colton complained about the choice of Warwick prior to his appearance. He claimed that Warwick "is not a spokesman for our subject" (Artificial Intelligence) and "allowing him influence through the Christmas lectures is a danger to the public perception of science". In response to Warwick's claims that computers could be creative, Colton, who is a professor of computational creativity, also said: "the AI community has done real science to reclaim words such as creativity and emotion which they claim computers will never have." Subsequent letters were generally positive; Ralph Rayner wrote: "With my youngest son, I attended all of the lectures and found them balanced and thought-provoking. They were not sensationalist. I applaud Warwick for his lectures."

== Awards and recognition ==
Warwick received the Future Health Technology Award in 2000, and was presented with the Institution of Engineering and Technology (IET) Achievement Medal in 2004. In 2008, he was awarded the Mountbatten Medal. In 2009 he received the Marcellin Champagnat award from Universidad Marista Guadalajara and the Golden Eurydice Award. In 2011 he received the Ellison-Cliffe Medal from the Royal Society of Medicine. In 2014, he was elected to the membership of the European Academy of Sciences and Arts. In 2018 Warwick was inducted into the International Academy for Systems and Cybernetic Sciences and in 2020 he was awarded an Honorary Fellowship of the Cybernetics Society.

He is the recipient of ten honorary doctorates, these being from Aston University, Coventry University, Robert Gordon University, Bradford University, University of Bedfordshire, Portsmouth University, Kingston University, Ss. Cyril and Methodius University of Skopje, Edinburgh Napier University, and Galgotias University.

== Reception ==
Warwick has both his critics and endorsers, some of whom describe him as a "maverick". Others see his work as "not very scientific" and more like "entertainment", whereas some regard him as "an extraordinarily creative experimenter", his presentations as "awesome" and his work as "profound".

== Publications ==
Warwick has written several books, articles and papers. A selection of his books:

- Kevin Warwick (2001). QI: The Quest for Intelligence. Piatkus Books. ISBN 978-0-7499-2230-6.
- Kevin Warwick (2004). I, Cyborg. University of Illinois Press. ISBN 978-0-252-07215-4.
- Kevin Warwick (2004). March of the Machines: The Breakthrough in Artificial Intelligence. University of Illinois Press. ISBN 978-0-252-07223-9.
- Kevin Warwick (30 August 2011). Artificial Intelligence: The Basics. Taylor & Francis. ISBN 978-0-415-56483-0.
- Kevin Warwick and Huma Shah (2016). Turing's Imitation Game. Cambridge University Press. ISBN 978-1-107-05638-1.

Lectures (inaugural and keynote lectures):

- 1998, Robert Boyle Lecture at the University of Oxford.
- 2000, Royal Institution Christmas Lectures. These lectures were repeated in 2001 during a tour of Japan, China and Korea.
- 2001, Higginson Lecture at Durham University, Hamilton institute inaugural lecture.
- 2003, Royal Academy of Engineering/Royal Society of Edinburgh Joint lecture in Edinburgh,
- 2003, IEEE (UK) Annual Lecture in London; Pittsburgh International Science and Technology Festival.
- 2004, Woolmer Lecture of the Institute of Physics and Engineering in Medicine at University of York; Robert Hooke Lecture (Westminster).
- 2005, Einstein Lecture in Potsdam, Germany
- 2006, Bernard Price Memorial Lecture tour in South Africa; Institution of Mechanical Engineers Prestige Lecture in London.
- 2007, Techfest plenary lecture in Mumbai; Kshitij keynote in Kharagpur (India); Engineer Techfest plenary lecture in NITK Surathkal (India); Annual Science Faculty lecture at University of Leicester; Graduate School in Physical Sciences and Engineering Annual Lecture, Cardiff University.
- 2008, Leslie Oliver Oration at Queen's Hospital; Techkriti keynote in Kanpur.
- 2008, Katholieke Universiteit Leuven, guest lecture "Four weddings and a Funeral" for the Microsoft Research Chair.
- 2009, Cardiff University, 125th Anniversary Lecture; Orwell Society, Eton College.
- 2010, Robert Gordon University launch of Research Institute for Innovation Design and Sustainability (IDEAS)
- 2011, Ellison-Cliffe Lecture, Royal Society of Medicine; Inaugural research conference keynote, Anglia Ruskin University.
- 2012, IET Pinkerton Lecture, Bangalore.; Institute of Electrical and Electronics Engineers UKRI 50 years Anniversary Lecture, Edinburgh.
- 2014, Sir Hugh Cairns Memorial Lecture, Society of British Neurological Surgeons, London.; Invited Keynote, BCS-SGAI International Conference on Artificial Intelligence, Cambridge University.
- 2016, Launch of Wales Festival of Innovation, Cardiff.
- 2017, Paul B. Baltes Lecture, Berlin-Brandenburg Academy of Sciences and Humanities.

Warwick is a regular presenter at the annual Careers Scotland Space School, University of Strathclyde.

He appeared at the 2009 World Science Festival with Mary McDonnell, Nick Bostrom, Faith Salie and Hod Lipson.

== See also ==
- Avatar Project
- Brain–computer interface
- Cyborg antenna
- EyeTap
- Grinder (biohacking)
- Stelarc
- The Age of Intelligent Machines
- Tim Cannon
