= Budapest Declaration on Machine Readable Travel Documents =

The Budapest Declaration on Machine Readable Travel Documents is a declaration issued by the Future of Identity in the Information Society (FIDIS), a Network of Excellence, to raise the concern to the public to the risks associated by a security architecture related to the management of Machine Readable Travel Documents (MRTDs), and its current implementation in passports of the European Union that creates some threats related to identity theft, and privacy. The declaration was proclaimed in Budapest in September 2006.
