= Peter Kyberd =

Canadian engineer

Peter Kyberd is a biomedical engineer specialising in rehabilitation. He is currently head of the School of the Built and Natural Environment at University of Derby. He serves on the editorial board of the Journal of Prosthetics and Orthotics, and the executive board of the national members society of the International Society of Prosthetics and Orthotics (ISPO). His main research activity has been the practical application of technology to rehabilitation and engineering in Orthopaedics. He has chaired both international upper limb research conferences; MEC and TIPS.

== Education ==
Kyberd has a first class degree from Durham University (Hatfield College), where he completed the science stream of the General Studies course and graduated in 1982. He then earned a MSc in Electronic Engineering from Southampton University, followed by a PhD from the same institution for work on the digital control of a multifunction prosthetic hand.

The PhD project lead to the first ever application of a microprocessor controller to an exo-prosthetic limb to be used in the field, as well as the development of a microprocessor controller for a multifunction hand. It was the fifth generation of the Southampton Hand, pioneered by Jim Nightingale.

== Career ==
His graduate job was as a programmer for CAP UK limited, in projects with the JET (Joint European Torus) and the Flight Management System for the A320 European Airbus for Smiths Industry.

He spent the 1990s working at the Oxford Orthopaedic Engineering Centre (part of the Nuffield Orthopaedic Centre) in Oxford. He worked on a range of projects related to the delivery of treatments orthopaedics. These included the study of the correction of deformity through limb distraction, return to driving following hip and knee implants, healing of leg fractures and the study of micromovement of artificial hips and knee implants. During this time he also continued to work on the design of advanced prosthetic arm systems with collaborations with leading labs in Italy and Sweden, and developing new ways to assess function in prosthetic hands.

He moved to the Cybernetics Department of Reading University in 2000, where he was part of the team that performed the first implant of a bi-directional nerve sensor on a healthy human being. This included Kevin Warwick using one of Kyberd's hands. The grip force detected by sensors in the hand fed back signals to his nervous system.

In 2003 he took up a Canada Research Chair in Rehabilitation Cybernetics at the Institute of Biomedical Engineering, University of New Brunswick. There, he conducted research in the clinical application of intelligent prosthetic arms, energy storage and return in prosthetic ankles and was part of the Upper Limb Prosthetics Outcome Measures Group (ULPOM), which promoted the use of validated and standardised tools of prosthetic assessment.

In 2015 he joined the University of Greenwich to serve as head of the Engineering and Science Department, before moving on to Portsmouth in November 2018. Since April 2023 he has been head of the School of the Built and Natural Environment at the University of Derby.

In November 2021 he published the book "Making hands", which is a history of the technology of artificial hands told through the stories of some of the pioneers.

As of June 2023 his PhD hand features in the Engineers Gallery at the London Science Museum.
