= GooglyMinotaur =

Radiohead chatbot

GooglyMinotaur was an instant messaging bot on the AOL Instant Messenger network. Developed by ActiveBuddy under contract by Capitol Records, GooglyMinotaur provided Radiohead-related information, and was released simultaneously with the band's fifth studio album, Amnesiac in June 2001. GooglyMinotaur was named for the character that appears on the Amnesiac album cover.

ActiveBuddy's first offering, GooglyMinotaur was by November 2001 on 387,000 buddy lists and had received more than 36 million messages. It provided tour information, band facts, MP3 downloads, and assorted exclusive content provided by the studio, Capitol Records, in addition to the idle conversation that typified the chatterbots of that period.

In March 2002, GooglyMinotaur was switched off, and responded with the message "Since his catapult into buddy-hood, GooglyMinotaur has sent about 60 million IM messages to nearly 1 million different people. Always dependable and infinitely wise, Googly seemed fitter and happier up until his very last days. At this time, reports state the cause of death is undetermined."

Users added GooglyMinotaur to their AIM buddy lists and could chat with it, ask for band information and play games such as hangman. ActiveBuddy's director of product marketing, Kathy Englar said the screen name was chosen in part because screen names work like URLs and desirable ones had to be claimed early; she did not think Capitol had been able to secure a screen name using Radiohead's own name. ActiveBuddy's chief executive Peter Levitan described the bot as a possible forerunner of services that could for example, alert users when tickets for a concert went on sale.

GooglyMinotaur was built by the same company and with the same technology as SmarterChild, ActiveBuddy's general-purpose chatbot. Members of the ActiveBuddy team have said that the origins of the two bots were closely linked, and that the company put deliberate effort into how its bots' personalities and responses were designed. The Computer History Museum has also described GooglyMinotaur as a SmarterChild-based chatbot created to promote Amnesiac.

The bot's success led other labels to commission similar promotions. In 2001, Warner Bros. Records announced a deal with ActiveBuddy for "LindsayBuddy", a bot promoting a new teenage act, a few months after the Capitol Records deal.

GooglyMinotaur has since been revisited in retrospectives on early chatbots. The A.V. Club marked its 15th anniversary with an oral history drawn from former ActiveBuddy and Capitol Records staff, and TechCrunch mentioned it in a 2023 look back at SmarterChild.
