= Windows Live Agents =

Chatterbot agents for Windows Live Messenger

- The Windows Live Agents logo.

- Windows Live Agents homepage
- Developer: Microsoft
- Final release: 5.1 / November 25, 2008
- Type: Chatterbot
- Website: Archived official website at the Wayback Machine (archive index)

Windows Live Agents within Windows Live Messenger

Windows Live Agents were chatterbot agents for Windows Live Messenger that was part of Microsoft's Windows Live services. They provided users the ability to interact with the agents through Windows Live Messenger to get more information about specific topics.

Windows Live Agents were used to entertain, encourage engagement with products or services, provide a new advertising opportunity for brand advertisers, and drive search and information retrieval.

Although support and development of Windows Live Agents has been discontinued as of June 30, 2009, existing Windows Live Agents were still available to be used from Windows Live Gallery until its discontinuation in 2011.

== Agents ==
Several agents that were available include:

- WLM Quickbot - "Quickbot can translate nearly all European languages, feed fresh news, solve any math expression, give weather information and perform many useful functions. You can use it in Bot Mode or in Random Person mode."
- Edge Bot by Ford Edge - "Find cool restaurants, hotspots, entertainment and more in your favorite cities from the Ford Edge Buddy."
- Movie Scout - "With MovieScout you can find movies near you. Search by genre or look at what's playing at your favorite movie theater. You can also watch a movie trailer for one of the new Warner Brothers movies in the Activity window."
- MSN Dating Bot - "Looking for love? The Dating Bot, powered by MSN Dating & Personals with Match.com, is here to help. Tell me a bit about yourself and what you're looking for, and I'll show you some possible dates."
- Astrology Bot - "Discover the astrological forces influencing your life and your destiny. A journey of self-discovery awaits as you explore your Zodiac Horoscope, Tarot Card and Chinese Readings, your dreams and more." [Offline]
- Muse - "Hi! I’m your Muse. I want you to do the write thing and fill your Windows Live Spaces blog. I’m always ready to help you find interesting topics, preserve precious memories, and record your daily life, thoughts, and actions. And then I’ll transfer whatever you write directly to your blog—just like that!"
- Encarta Instant Answers - "The Encarta Instant Answers Bot finds answers to questions asked in the conversation window using the Windows Live Search API. Rich content from the Encarta web site is displayed in the Activity window next to the conversation."
- WiLMa Bot - "Chat with WiLMa, the Windows Live Messenger Assistant, and learn more about all the new features in Windows live Messenger and more. Add WiLMa to your contact list and get the inside scoop on what's hot with Messenger."
- SmarterChild - "This Bot is a real "know it all". You can ask it almost anything and it will give you the answer and if you are bored, you can play games with it. It uses advertising inline in its conversation.
- Don Lothario - Play games, personality quizzes and more.
- GSAgent - Give you helpful computer tips and play fun games.
- LittleGreenBulb - Educates people about energy efficient light bulbs, and take pledges from people to replace bulbs
- Games Bot - Play five different games with this bot
- Alienchat - A bot that supposedly intercepts alien transmissions.
- imapps - "To commemorate the PDC and the launch of the MSN Messenger Activity API, we have created a Bot that will give you more info about the Worlds Best App contest as well as info about the PDC."
- Hillary Robot- A virtual 2008 US presidential candidate.
- Barack Obama Robot - A virtual 2008 US presidential candidate.
- Hacker - "Part of the Messenger Friends"
- Alfred - "Part of the Messenger Friends"
- Frank - The bot that knows all about drugs in the UK.
- Windows Live Messenger translation bot - Invite a friend and chat in different languages with the bot translating for you.
- Celebrity Bot - Gossip about celebrities.

== History ==
In October 2006, Microsoft acquired privately owned Colloquis Inc., a provider of conversational online business solutions that feature natural language-processing technology. Microsoft plans to offer services based on Colloquis technology to businesses with online operations, as well as incorporating the technology into its own products, including Windows Live Agents and Microsoft's Customer Care Framework (CCF).

On November 25, 2008, Microsoft released Windows Live Agents 5.1 SDK for developers to build their Windows Live Agents for Windows Live Messenger. However, they also announced that this will be the last version of the Windows Live Agents SDK. Support for Windows Live Agents has been discontinued on June 30, 2009. The Windows Live Agents Partner Hosting Portal also stopped accepting any new Agents hosting requests as of this date.

In March 2016, a similar concept of "Bots" was announced for Skype, a Windows Live Messenger successor application after Microsoft acquired Skype in 2011.

== See also ==
- Windows Live
- Windows Live Messenger
