= Hold Me to This =

Hold Me to This: Christopher O'Riley Plays Radiohead

Studio album by Christopher O'Riley
- Released: April 12, 2005
- Recorded: ?
- Genre: Classical
- Length: 58:45
- Labels: World Village, Harmonia Mundi 468034
- Producers: Rene Goiffon, Da-Hong Seeto

Christopher O'Riley chronology
True Love Waits (2003)	Hold Me to This: Christopher O'Riley Plays Radiohead (2005)

Professional ratings
Review scores
Source	Rating
Pitchfork Media	(6.2/10) 22 Apr 05
Robert Christgau	(dud)
Rolling Stone	6 Jun 05

Hold Me to This: Christopher O'Riley Plays Radiohead is the second tribute album by classical pianist Christopher O'Riley of songs by the rock band Radiohead, the first being True Love Waits. Like O'Riley's earlier album, Hold Me To This surveys a broad range of Radiohead's work, producing piano arrangements of complex tracks such as "2 + 2 = 5," "Like Spinning Plates" and "Paranoid Android."

== Track listing ==
All songs by Radiohead (Colin Greenwood, Jonny Greenwood, Ed O'Brien, Phil Selway, and Thom Yorke), arrangements by Christopher O'Riley.

1. "There There" – 4:05
2. "(Nice Dream)" – 3:40
3. "No Surprises" – 3:26
4. "Polyethylene Part 2" – 3:03
5. "How I Made My Millions" – 3:22
6. "Like Spinning Plates" – 3:31
7. "Sail to the Moon" – 3:54
8. "The Tourist" – 4:10
9. "Cuttooth" – 5:11
10. "2 + 2 = 5" – 3:16
11. "Talk Show Host" – 7:10
12. "Gagging Order" – 3:19
13. "Paranoid Android" – 5:37
14. "Street Spirit (Fade Out)" – 5:02
