= Knives Out (song) =

2001 single by Radiohead

Single by Radiohead

from the album Amnesiac
- Released: 6 August 2001
- Recorded: 10 March 1999 – 17 March 2000
- Genre: Post-rock
- Length: 4:17
- Label: Parlophone
- Songwriter: Radiohead
- Producers: Nigel Godrich; Radiohead

Radiohead singles chronology
"Pyramid Song" (2001)	"Knives Out" (2001)	"There There" (2003)

Music video
- "Knives Out" on YouTube

"Knives Out" is a song by the English rock band Radiohead, released as the second single from their fifth album, Amnesiac (2001). It features lyrics about cannibalism and guitars influenced by the Smiths. The music video was directed by Michel Gondry.

Critics described "Knives Out" as one of the more conventional tracks on Amnesiac. It received positive reviews and reached number 13 on the UK singles chart and number one on the Canadian singles chart. "Knives Out" has been covered by the Flaming Lips, Christopher O'Riley and Brad Mehldau.

== Recording ==
Radiohead recorded "Knives Out" during the sessions for their albums Kid A and Amnesiac, which were recorded simultaneously in 1999 and 2000. Although the albums moved away from Radiohead's earlier guitar-led sound, the singer, Thom Yorke, said "Knives Out" was "no departure at all" and "survived because it was too good to miss".

According to a studio diary kept by the guitarist Ed O'Brien, "Knives Out" took 373 days to complete. He wrote that it was "probably the most straight-ahead thing we've done in years ... and that might explain why we took so long on it". He felt that successful bands often over-embellish their music, especially songs written on acoustic guitar, but that Radiohead had captured the song's essence. In November 1999, Radiohead performed "Knives Out" during a webcast from their studio.

"Knives Out" was influenced by the British rock band the Smiths. Before its release, O'Brien played it for the Smiths guitarist, Johnny Marr, who said: "I was beyond flattered and quite speechless – which takes some doing. He explained to me that with that song they'd tried to take a snapshot of the way I'd done things in the Smiths – and I guess you can hear that in it." In another interview, he said: "The music did touch me the same way the Smiths did, and it was a wonderful feeling ... that sort of emotional quality and that sort of melodicism."

== Composition ==
"Knives Out"
A 25-second sample of "Knives Out"

According to Drowned in Sound, "Knives Out" is the most conventional song on Amnesiac. It features "drifting" guitar lines, "driving" percussion, a "wandering" bassline, "haunting" vocals and "eerie" lyrics. Pitchfork likened it to Radiohead's 1997 album OK Computer, with strummed acoustic guitar, "chiming" electric guitar and reverb. Yorke said the lyrics were about cannibalism, the "idea of the businessman walking out on his wife and kids and never coming back", and the "thousand-yard stare when you look at someone close to you and you know they're gonna die".

== Music video ==
The "Knives Out" music video was directed by Michel Gondry. Gondry was going through a breakup at the time, and expressed his feelings in the video concept, which has Yorke grieving in a hospital room. Gondry described the collaboration as a "terrible experience", and said: "I showed [Yorke] a storyboard and every single detail: he was completely excited and happy for it – and then, it turned out, they all criticise me for being selfish and putting my own views on it and my own introspection ... It did not go smoothly, but if it went smoothly, it would be mediocre."

== Release ==
In the UK, "Knives Out" was released on 6 August 2001 as the second Amnesiac single in three formats: two CD singles and a 12-inch vinyl single. It reached number 13 on the UK singles chart. "Knives Out" was covered by the Flaming Lips on their 2003 EP Fight Test, the pianist Christopher O'Riley on his 2003 album True Love Waits, and the jazz pianist Brad Mehldau on his 2005 album Day is Done. The 2019 film Knives Out takes its name from the song. The director, Rian Johnson, a Radiohead fan, said the film was unrelated but that "Knives Out" was a good title for a murder mystery.

== Reception ==
David Merryweather of Drowned in Sound gave the "Knives Out" single nine out of ten, saying Jonny Greenwood's "chiming" guitar captured the "romantic disappointment" and "wistful ache" of the Smiths. Reviewing Amnesiac for Pitchfork, Ryan Schreiber felt the guitar line was too similar to Radiohead's 1997 song "Paranoid Android", writing: "Great melody. However, they've fucking used it before."

In 2010, Consequence of Sound praised "Knives Out" as one of Radiohead's "creepiest" songs: "It's one of many tracks from the English quintet that tickles the bones rather than warms them. But that's what makes Radiohead so unique." In 2020, the Guardian named it the 13th-best Radiohead song, writing: "The impenetrable Amnesiac debunked industry rumours that Radiohead were primed for a bankable comeback – but amid that album lay this meat-and-potatoes rocker, its scurrying riffs, mystic ambience and cannibalistic lyrics qualifying as glorious light relief."

== Track listings ==
- All tracks written by Radiohead.

UK CD1 and 12-inch single (CDFHEIS 45103; 12FHEIT 45103)

1. "Knives Out" – 4:17
2. "Cuttooth" – 5:24
3. "Life in a Glasshouse" (full length version) – 5:06

UK CD2 (CDFHEIT 45103)

1. "Knives Out" – 4:17
2. "Worrywort" – 4:37
3. "Fog" – 4:05

European maxi-CD and Australasian CD single (7243 8 79760 2 3)

1. "Knives Out" – 4:17
2. "Worrywort" – 4:37
3. "Fog" – 4:04
4. "Life in a Glasshouse" (full length version) – 5:06

US enhanced maxi-CD single (C2 7243 8 77668 0 8)

1. "Knives Out" – 4:17
2. "Cuttooth" – 5:24
3. "Life in a Glasshouse" (full length version) – 5:06
4. "Pyramid Song" (enhanced video) – 5:05

Japanese CD single (TOCP-65871)

1. "Knives Out" – 4:17
2. "Cuttooth" – 5:25
3. "Worrywort" – 4:37
4. "Fog" – 4:05
5. "Life in a Glasshouse" (full length version) – 5:06

== Charts ==
=== Weekly charts ===
Weekly chart performance for "Knives Out"
Chart (2001)	Peak position
Australia (ARIA)	56
Canada (Nielsen SoundScan)	1
Europe (Eurochart Hot 100)	38
France (SNEP)	46
Ireland (IRMA)	25
Italy (FIMI)	17
Netherlands (Single Top 100)	63
Scottish Singles Sales (Official Charts)	15
UK Singles (Official Charts)	13

=== Year-end charts ===
2001 year-end chart performance for "Knives Out"
Chart (2001)	Position
Canada (Nielsen SoundScan)	11

2002 year-end chart performance for "Knives Out"
Chart (2002)	Position
Canada (Nielsen SoundScan)	58

== Release history ==
Release dates and formats for "Knives Out"
Region	Date	Format(s)	Label(s)	Ref.
United States	2 July 2001	Triple A radio	Capitol	
United States	3 July 2001	Alternative radio	Capitol	
United Kingdom	6 August 2001	12-inch vinyl; CD	Parlophone	
Australia	27 August 2001	CD	Parlophone	
Japan	7 September 2001	CD	Parlophone; EMI	
