= True Love Waits (album) =

True Love Waits: Christopher O'Riley Plays Radiohead

Studio album by Christopher O'Riley
- Released: June 10, 2003
- Recorded: January 6–7, 2003
- Genre: Classical
- Length: 60:16
- Labels: Odyssey, Sony Classical; SK 87321
- Producer: Laraine Perri

Christopher O'Riley chronology
True Love Waits: Christopher O'Riley Plays Radiohead (2003)	Hold Me to This (2005)

Professional ratings
Review scores
Source	Rating
Allmusic	3/5 stars

True Love Waits: Christopher O'Riley Plays Radiohead is the first tribute album by classical pianist Christopher O'Riley of songs by the alternative rock band Radiohead.

The concept of reinterpreting Radiohead's works is not new. Most notably, jazz pianist Brad Mehldau recorded covers of "Exit Music (For a Film)", "Everything in Its Right Place" and "Paranoid Android". Perhaps the most interesting part of O'Riley's album is his selection of Radiohead songs: he has chosen a broad view of the band's music, including tracks from earlier work ("Black Star", "Fake Plastic Trees", "Bulletproof") as well as more conceptual work, such as "Airbag", "Subterranean Homesick Alien", and "Motion Picture Soundtrack".

True Love Waits was followed in 2005 by O'Riley's second Radiohead tribute album, Hold Me to This.

== Track listing ==
All songs by Radiohead (Colin Greenwood, Jonny Greenwood, Ed O'Brien, Phil Selway, and Thom Yorke), arrangements by Christopher O'Riley.

1. "Everything in Its Right Place" – 4:06
2. "Knives Out" – 4:38
3. "Black Star" – 3:35
4. "Karma Police" – 4:37
5. "Let Down" – 5:31
6. "Airbag" – 3:47
7. "Subterranean Homesick Alien" – 4:15
8. "Thinking About You" – 2:00
9. "Exit Music (For a Film)" – 4:29
10. "You" – 2:55
11. "Bulletproof" – 3:02
12. "Fake Plastic Trees" – 4:57
13. "I Can't" – 2:37
14. "True Love Waits" – 5:00
15. "Motion Picture Soundtrack" – 4:48
