= Scratchcard =

Card with hidden text revealed by scratching

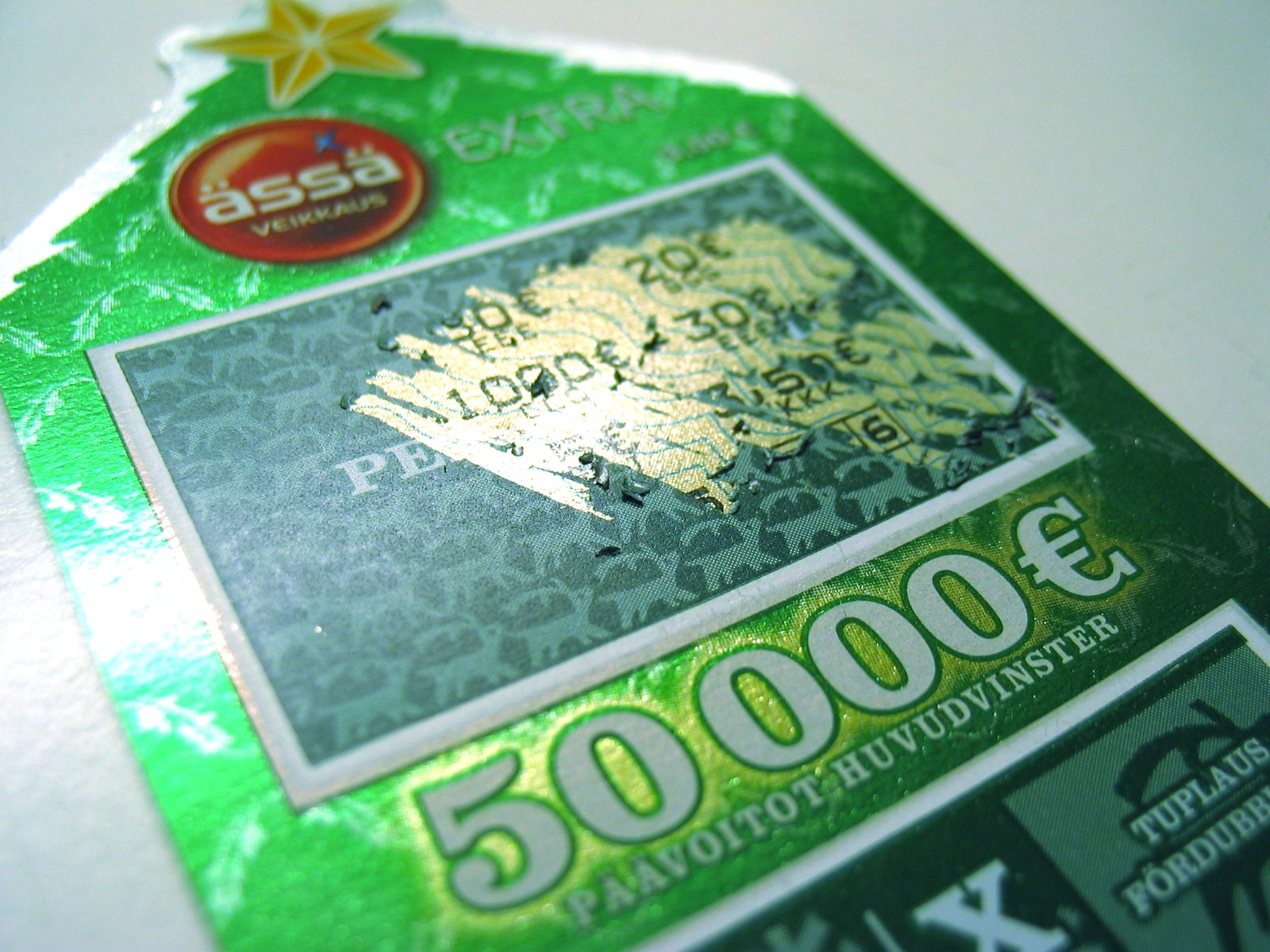
To win an amount of money in this scratch game the player has to find it three times under the scratch area.

A scratchcard (Note: Also called a scratch off, scratch ticket, scratcher, scratchum, scratch-it, scratch game, scratch-and-win, instant game, instant lottery, scratchie, lot scrots, or scritchies) is a card designed for competitions, often made of thin cardstock or plastic, where one or more areas contain concealed information which can be revealed by scratching off an opaque covering.

Applications include cards sold for gambling (especially, lottery games and quizzes), free-of-charge cards for quizzes, fraudulent free cards encouraging calls to premium rate phone services, and to conceal confidential information such as PINs for telephone calling cards (otherwise known as recharge cards) and other prepaid services.

In some cases, the entire scratchable area needs to be scratched to see whether a prize has been won—the card is printed either to be a winner or not—or to reveal the secret code; the result does not depend upon what portions are scratched off. In other cases, some but not all areas have to be scratched; this may apply in a quiz, where the area corresponding to the right answer is scratched, or in some gambling applications where, depending on which areas are scratched, the card wins or loses. In these cases, the card becomes invalid if too many areas are scratched. After losing, one can scratch all areas to see if, how, and what one could have won with this card.

== Technology ==
The scratchcard itself is made of paper-based card, or plastic, with hidden information such as PIN or HRN (Hidden Recharge Number) printed on it, covered by an opaque substance (usually latex). The original cards were covered with an environmentally unsafe solvent based coating. In the late 1980s, adhesive specialist Jerome Greenfield invented a safe water-based coating still used in scratchers today that can be scratched off relatively easily, while resistant to normal abrasion. Other types of scratch panel are scratch labels, hot stamp foil, or 'sandwich' labels which are technologies that are easy to produce for manufacturers without specialised equipment for applying latex panels. Unlike silkscreen latex panels that bond with the card body, labels are distinctly separate to the card body and applied by adhesion which makes them prone to sophisticated and fraudulent manipulation.

Another technology-enabled form of scratch card can also be found online in the form of mobile applications. They are usually programmed by game developers and published on appropriate app stores such as the Apple App Store or Google Play Store for review and publication.

In the US, it is common to use a printed barcode to identify winning cards. To prevent abuse, the barcode is covered with an opaque latex ink.

== Gambling and quizzes ==
=== Origins ===
The original game tickets were produced using manual randomization techniques. In 1974 the American company Scientific Games Corporation led by scientist John Koza and retail promotions specialist Daniel Bower produced the first computer-generated instant lottery game. In 1987, Astro-Med, Inc. of West Warwick, Rhode Island, received the U.S. Patent for the instant scratch-off lottery ticket, but the patent acknowledges that "instant-game tickets comprising a card having game-playing indicia imprinted on a window thereon and a removable opaque layer covering the window" had already been available for a number of years.

Simple prize scratchcards require the player, for example, to scratch off three (or more) areas hiding numbers, symbols, etc. If all the items revealed are the same, a prize has been won. More complicated scratchcards have several different ways to win on one card. Other scratchcards involve matching symbols, pictures or words, or are adaptations of popular (card-)games such as blackjack, poker or Monopoly. Games are also tied to popular themes such as Harley Davidson, Major League Baseball, NASCAR, the National Hockey League, Marvel Comics and FIFA World Cup.

There are currently two major manufacturers of game tickets: Scientific Games Corporation, with production facilities in the US, Chile, UK, Germany, Canada, Brazil and Australia; and Pollard Banknote, with production facilities in the US and Canada. There are several other smaller manufacturers in North America, Europe, and Asia.

=== Popularity ===
Scratchcards are a popular form of gambling due to their low cost, their distribution in many corner stores and gas stations, and the opportunity to win instantly, as opposed to waiting for a draw like many lotteries. There is a trend towards more expensive scratchcards (20–50 USD) that have prizes in the millions of dollars. However, many such "instant" tickets sold in the US, especially in Massachusetts and New York, do not pay top prizes "instantly," but rather over many years, with no cash lump sum option.

The popularity of lottery scratchcards has been increasing at a greater rate than any other form of lottery.

=== Predictability ===
In the 21st century there have been attempts to increase the odds on finding a prize-winning card based on statistics, by tracking the amount of prize money won and cards sold to calculate accurate current odds. There have been a number of instances where a series of cards are still available although all major prizes have been won. Some lotteries make this information available to all free of charge to help promote their games. Hypothetically, large early payouts may exceed ultimate sales before expiration of the game card series. However, the low odds of winning – typically from less than 1 in 5 to about 1 in 2.5 – and players who buy cards unaware of the low return offset these losses, so the lottery still makes a profit.

=== Second-chance sweepstakes ===
Many state lotteries also run a second-chance sweepstakes in conjunction with the retail sale of state lottery scratchcards in an effort to increase consumer demand for scratchcards and to help control the litter problems associated with the improper disposal of non-winning lottery tickets. Since lottery tickets and scratchcards are considered in the United States to be bearer instruments under the Uniform Commercial Code, these scratchcard promotions can be entered with non-winning tickets that are picked up as litter.

=== Break opens ===
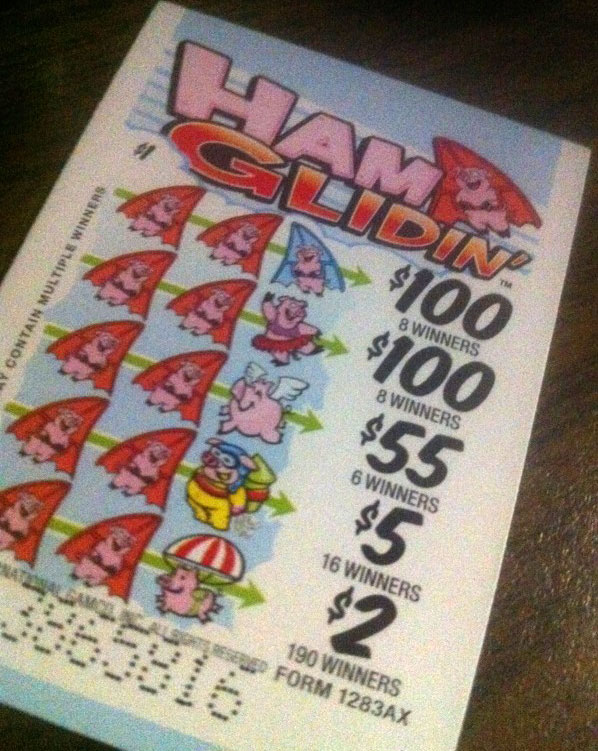
A pull-tab game

Break Opens, also known as breakopens, break open cards, strip tickets, pull-tabs, nevada tickets or in some Bingo Halls as "pickles" are lottery or bingo cards on which there are concealed letters, numbers, or symbols that have been predetermined as winners. The cards are often made of cardboard and contain perforated cover window tabs, behind which the combinations are printed. The purchaser must "break open" the card, or pull up the pull-tabs, to see the information printed within, and then must confirm with winning combinations printed on the back of the card, various cards may have come from the printer highlighted as winning under the tabs. The winning combination will be highlighted, making the identification of winning tickets easier.

=== Online gambling scratchcards ===
By around 2010 online versions of virtual "scratchcard" (not real cards) gambling games which utilized Macromedia Flash and Java to simulate scratching a card on a computer were available. Virtual cards could be bought, and prizes collected, over an Internet connection.

=== Fraudulent practices ===
A widespread misuse of scratchcards is the free-of-charge distribution of cards offering a range of prizes, ranging from extremely low-value to very desirable; for example from time-limited discount vouchers redeemable only through a specified agent to cars. Cards always reveal that a prize has been won, but the nature and value of the prize can only be determined by phoning a premium rate telephone claim line costing a significant sum per minute. Calls to this number are designed by the promoter always to take several minutes, and the prize won is, in reality, always of far less value than the cost of the call, and usually not worth claiming. Regulatory authorities for telephone services have been taking action against such schemes, issuing warnings and large fines.

=== Games sold with claimed jackpots ===
Over the years, many lotteries have continued to sell scratch games, while failing to disclose that the larger prizes or jackpot have already been claimed in order to discourage players from no longer playing a won scratch game, though before the 2000s and direct connections between the lottery and their sales terminals could be made, there was no expectation of this to be known. In February 2018 it was reported that some scratch cards in the UK are still sold even after the jackpots have already been won. Research by The Guardian newspaper found that the £250,000 Gold game, which advertises 15 top prizes worth a quarter of a million pounds each, were still being sold after all 15 jackpots had been claimed.

This happened again in May 2018, in which the 20X Cash Scratchcard was still being sold after the last jackpot prize was claimed. Many lotteries since the start of the 2010s have begun to have their retailers print out up-to-date game lists from their terminals daily or weekly (often with the force of state, provincial, or national law after consumer watchdog organizations or television station investigative units have exposed the practice), which note games where jackpots have already been won or which have large prizes left, along with up-to-date winners' lists on their websites.

== Cards hiding confidential information ==
Scratchcards can also be used to distribute confidential information, without any element of chance. A common example is the phone card or recharge card sold for a price which provides specified phone call usage. The card itself, unlike a credit card, has no function in itself; it is simply a vehicle to inform the purchaser confidentially of the PIN required to make the phone calls paid for.

== Gallery ==
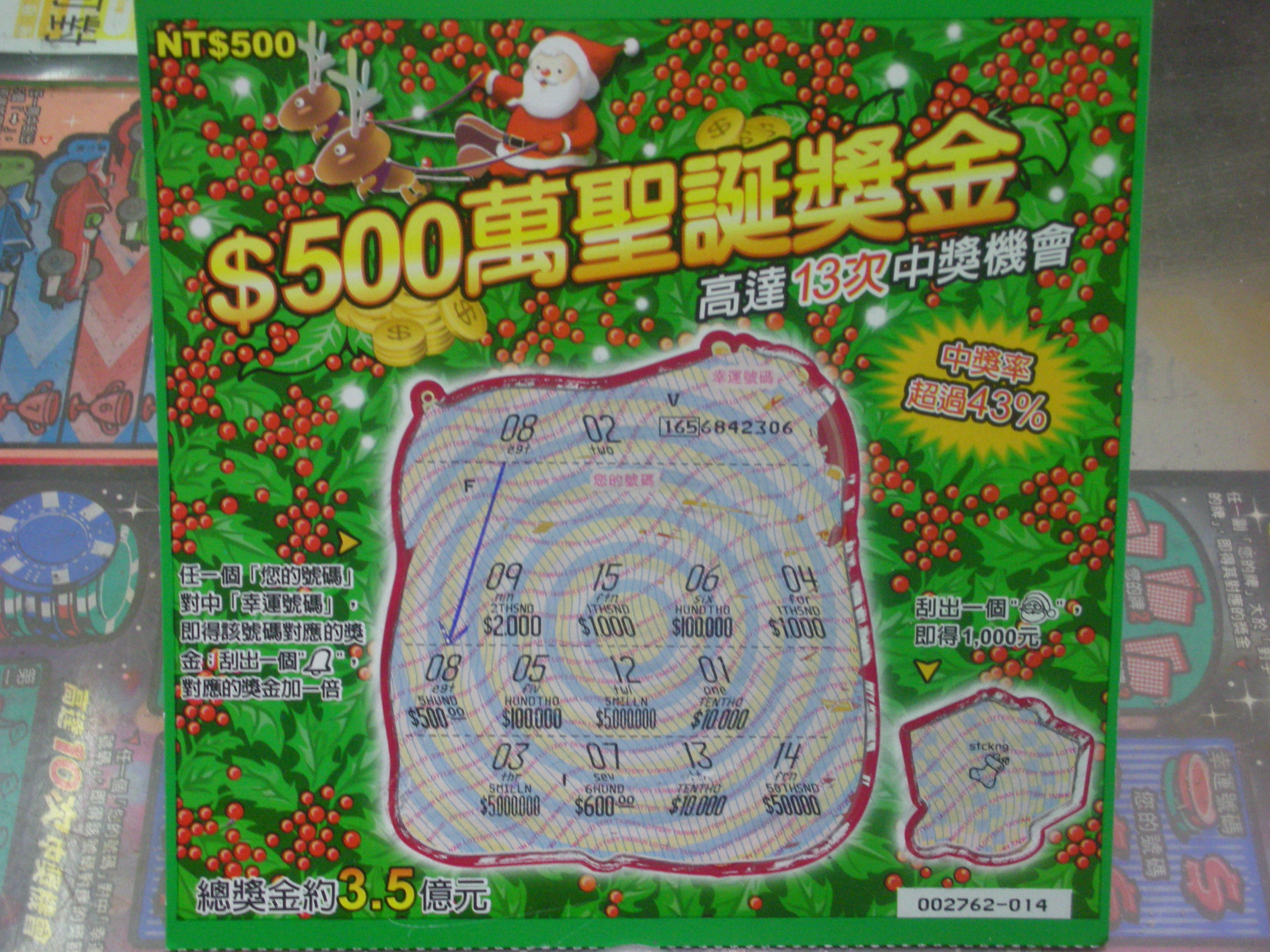

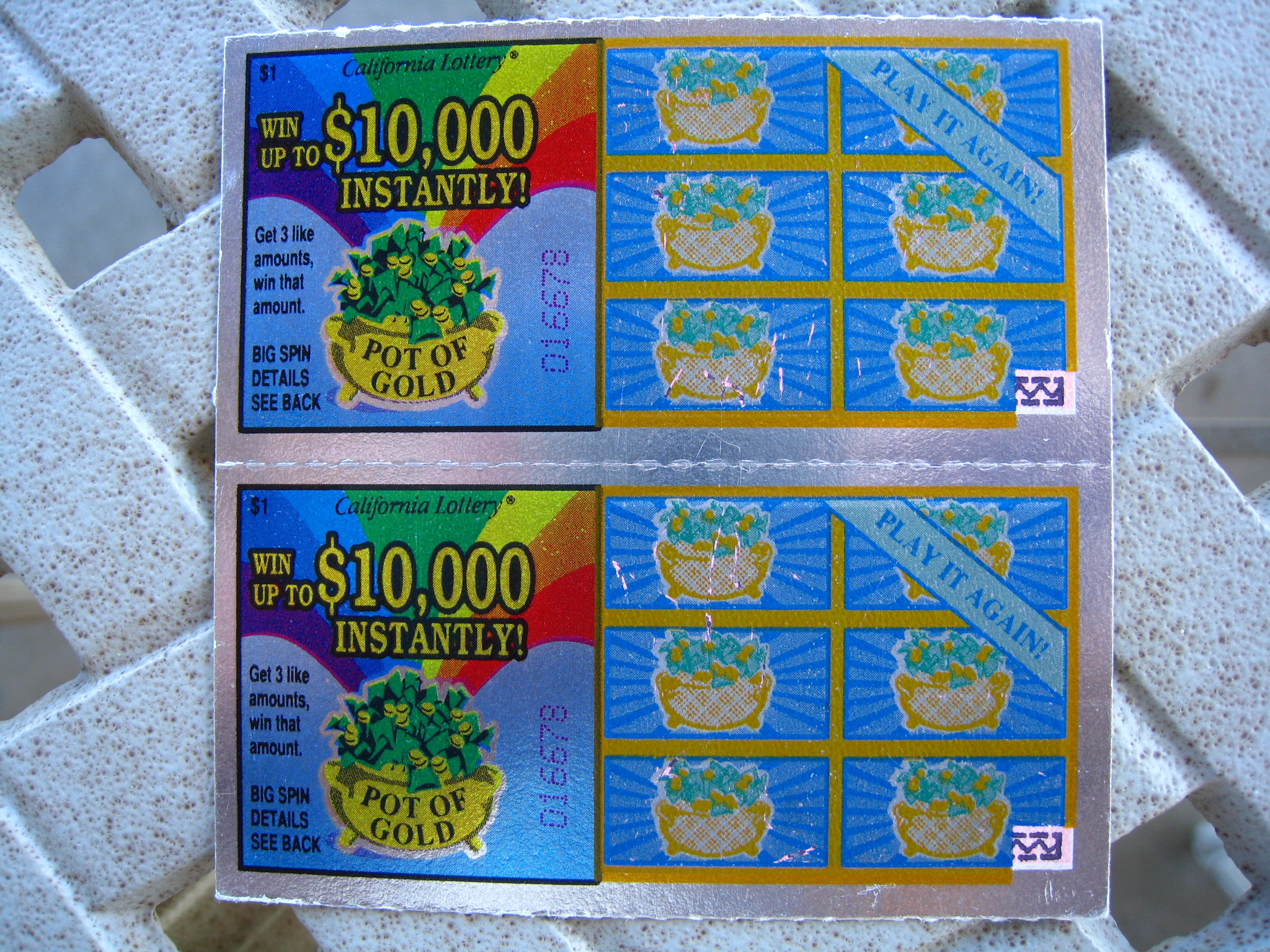

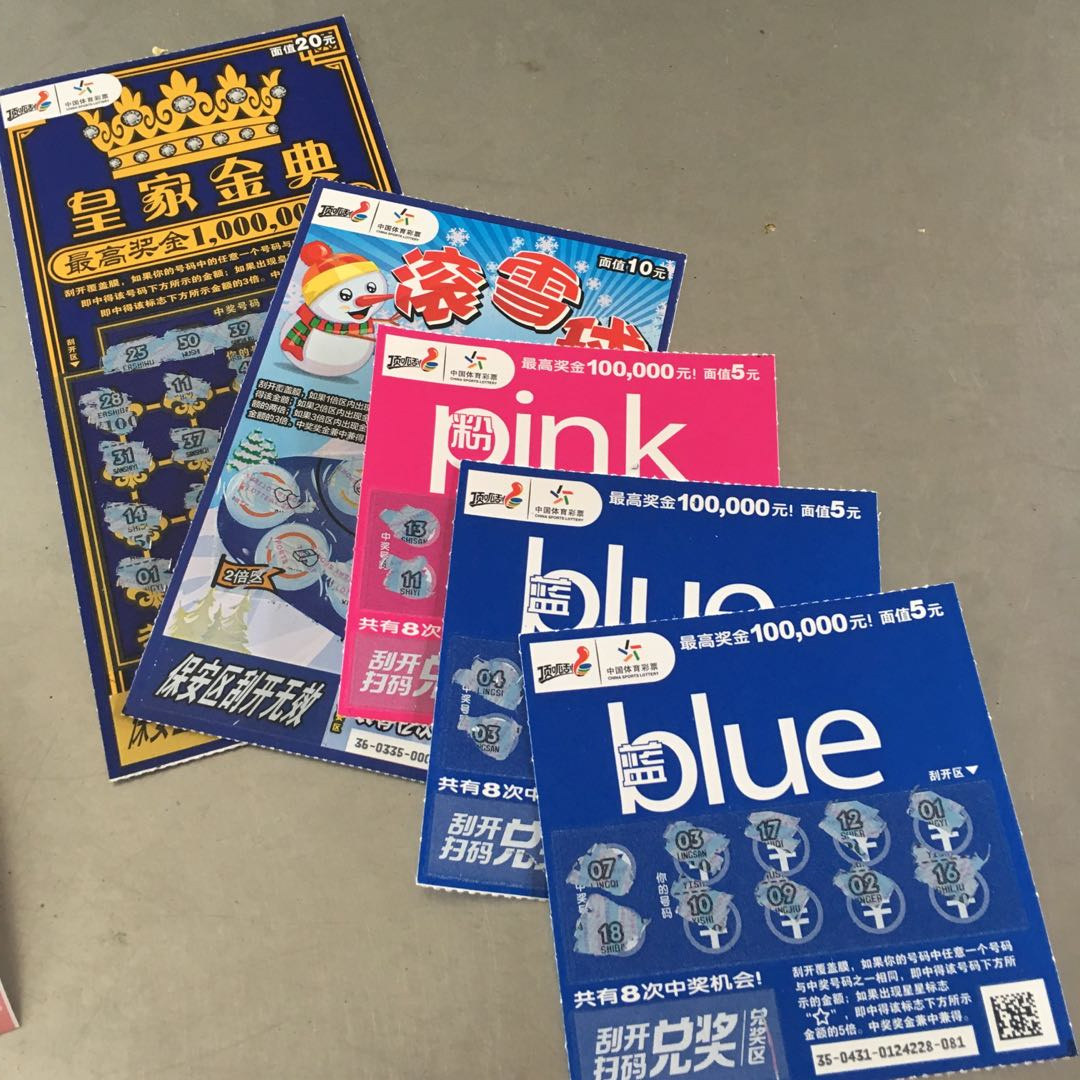

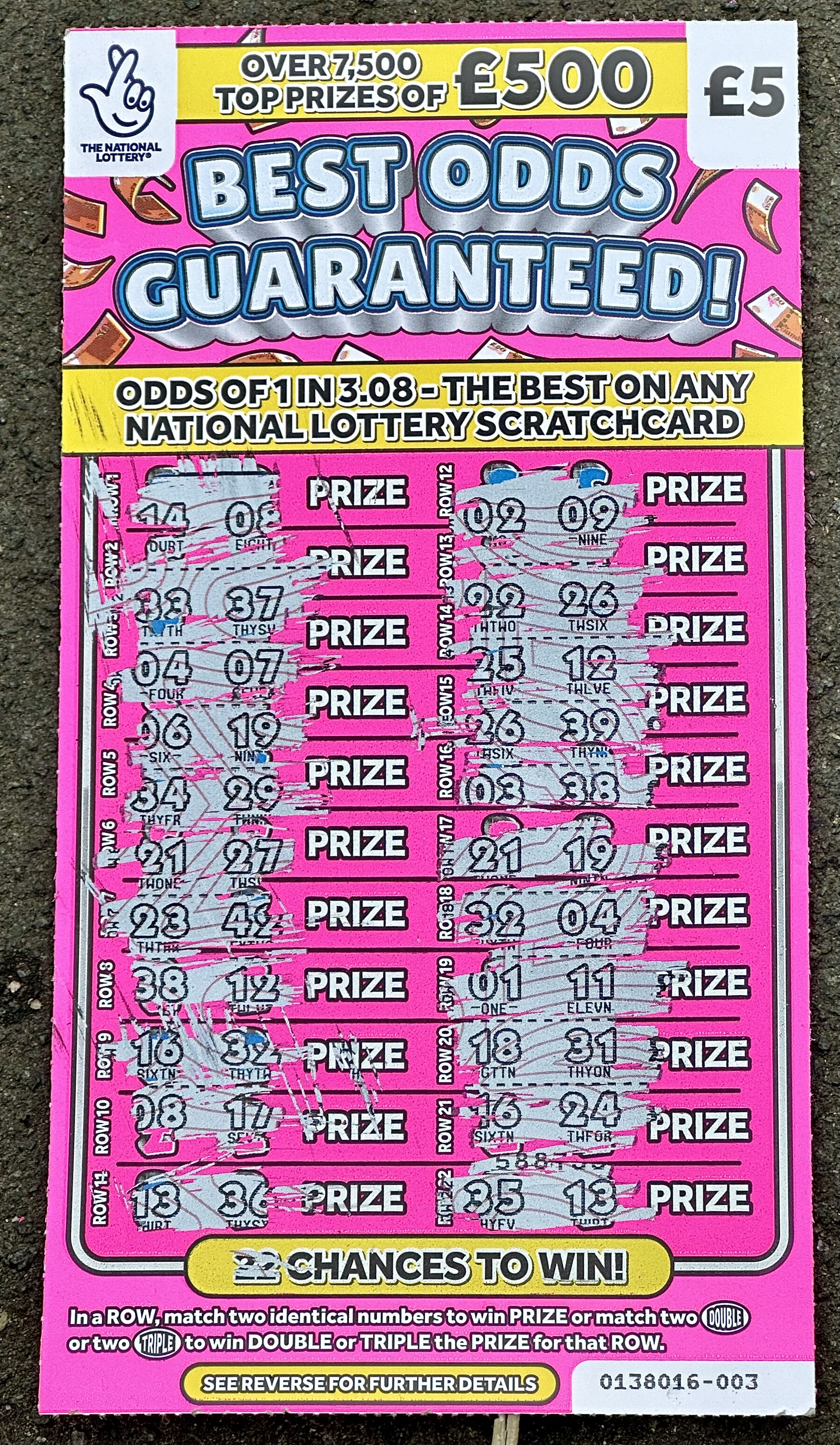
Front side of a National Lottery scratchcard (United Kingdom)

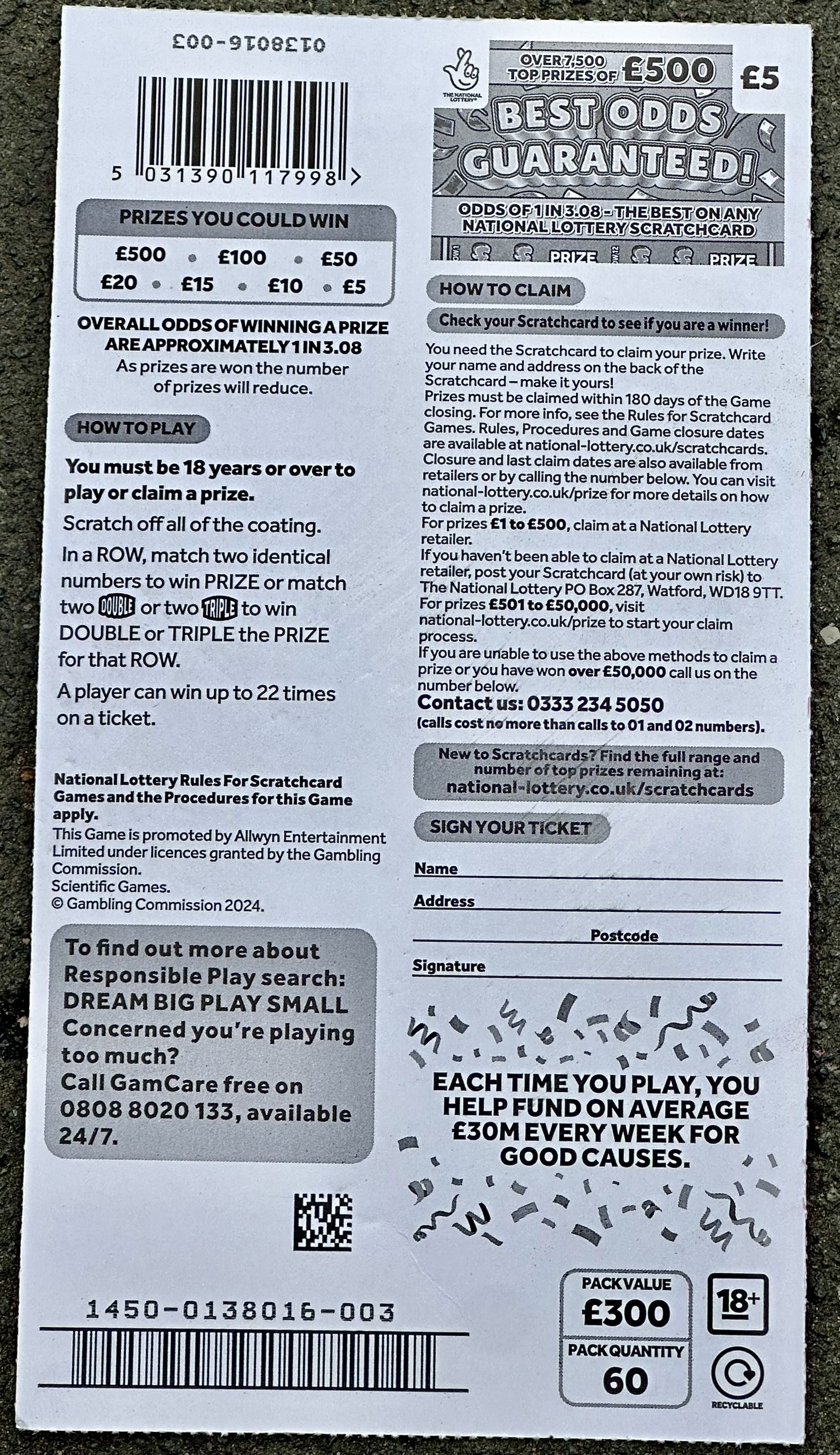
Reverse side of a National Lottery scratchcard (United Kingdom)

== See also ==
- Coin board
