= Amnesiac (album) =

2001 studio album by Radiohead

Studio album by Radiohead
- Released: 30 May 2001
- Recorded: 4 January 1999 – 18 April 2000
- Studios: Guillaume Tell, Paris; Medley, Copenhagen; Radiohead studio, Oxfordshire
- Genres: Experimental rock; electronica; post-rock; jazz rock; alternative rock
- Length: 43:57
- Labels: Parlophone; Capitol
- Producers: Nigel Godrich; Radiohead

Radiohead chronology
Kid A (2000)	Amnesiac (2001)	I Might Be Wrong: Live Recordings (2001)

Singles from Amnesiac
- 1. "Pyramid Song" Released: 16 May 2001; 2. "Knives Out" Released: 6 August 2001

Amnesiac is the fifth studio album by the English rock band Radiohead, released on 30 May 2001 by EMI. It was recorded with the producer Nigel Godrich in the same sessions as Radiohead's previous album, Kid A (2000). Radiohead split the work in two as they felt it was too dense for a double album. As with Kid A, Amnesiac incorporates influences from electronic music, 20th-century classical music, jazz and krautrock. The final track, "Life in a Glasshouse", is a collaboration with the jazz trumpeter Humphrey Lyttelton and his band.

After having released no singles for Kid A, Radiohead promoted Amnesiac with the singles "Pyramid Song" and "Knives Out", accompanied by music videos. Videos were also made for "Pulk/Pull Revolving Doors" and "Like Spinning Plates", as well as "I Might Be Wrong", which was released as a promotional single. Radiohead also launched GooglyMinotaur, a chatbot with which fans could interact on AIM. In June 2001, Radiohead began the Amnesiac tour, incorporating their first North American tour in three years and a homecoming performance in Oxford.

Amnesiac debuted at number one on the UK Albums Chart and number two on the US Billboard 200. By October 2008, it had sold over 900,000 copies worldwide. It is certified platinum in the UK, the US and Canada, and gold in Japan. It received positive reviews, though some critics felt it was too experimental or less cohesive than Kid A, or saw it as a collection of Kid A outtakes.

Amnesiac was named one of the year's best albums by numerous publications. It was nominated for the Mercury Prize and several Grammy Awards, winning for Best Recording Package for the special edition. "Pyramid Song" was named one of the best tracks of the decade by Rolling Stone, NME and Pitchfork, and Rolling Stone ranked Amnesiac number 320 in its 2012 list of the "500 Greatest Albums of All Time". Kid A Mnesia, an anniversary reissue compiling Kid A, Amnesiac and previously unreleased material, was released in 2021.

== Recording ==
Radiohead and their producer, Nigel Godrich, recorded Amnesiac during the same sessions as their previous album, Kid A, released in October 2000. The sessions took place from January 1999 to mid-2000 in Guillaume Studios in Paris, Medley Studios in Copenhagen, and Radiohead's newly built studio in Oxfordshire. The drummer, Philip Selway, said the sessions had "two frames of mind ... a tension between our old approach of all being in a room playing together and the other extreme of manufacturing music in the studio. I think Amnesiac comes out stronger in the band-arrangement way."

The sessions drew influence from electronic music, 20th-century classical music, jazz and krautrock, using synthesisers, ondes Martenot, drum machines, strings and brass. The strings, arranged by the guitarist Jonny Greenwood, were performed by the Orchestra of St John's and recorded in Dorchester Abbey, a 12th-century church close to Radiohead's studio.

Radiohead considered releasing the work as a double album, but felt it was too dense. The singer, Thom Yorke, said Radiohead split it into two albums because "they cancel each other out as overall finished things" and came from "two different places". He felt Amnesiac offered a "different take" on Kid A and "a form of explanation". The band members stressed that they saw Amnesiac not as a collection of Kid A B-sides or outtakes but an album in its own right. Yorke said the title was inspired by a Gnostic belief that the trauma of birth erases memories of past lives, an idea he found fascinating.

=== Tracks ===
On "Packt Like Sardines in a Crushd Tin Box", Radiohead used the pitch-correcting software AutoTune to process Yorke's vocals and create a "nasal, depersonalised" sound. "Pulk/Pull Revolving Doors" began as an attempt to record another song, "True Love Waits". It features keyboards recorded during the OK Computer sessions. Radiohead disabled the erase heads on the tape recorders so that the tape repeatedly recorded over itself, creating a "ghostly" evolving tape loop, and manipulated the results in Pro Tools. Deciding that the arrangement did not fit "True Love Waits", Radiohead used it to create a new track. Yorke added a spoken vocal and used AutoTune to process it into melody. According to Yorke, AutoTune "desperately tries to search for the music in your speech, and produces notes at random. If you've assigned it a key, you've got music." The "True Love Waits" version of "Pulk/Pull Revolving Doors" was eventually released on the 2021 compilation Kid A Mnesia.

For "You And Whose Army?", Radiohead attempted to capture the "soft, warm, proto-doowop sound" of the 1940s harmony group the Ink Spots. They muffled microphones with egg boxes and used the ondes Martenot's resonating palme diffuseur loudspeaker to treat the vocals. Unlike many tracks from the sessions, the band recorded it live. The guitarist Ed O'Brien said: "We rehearsed it a bit, not too much, then just went in and did it. It's just us doing our thing as a band." According to a diary kept by O'Brien, "Knives Out" took over a year to complete, as Radiohead had been tempted to over-embellish it. It was influenced by the guitar work of Johnny Marr of the Smiths. Yorke said "Knives Out" did not depart from Radiohead's earlier style, and "survived because it was too good to miss". "Dollars and Cents" was edited down from an eleven-minute jam, inspired by the krautrock band Can, who would record extensively and then edit their recordings.

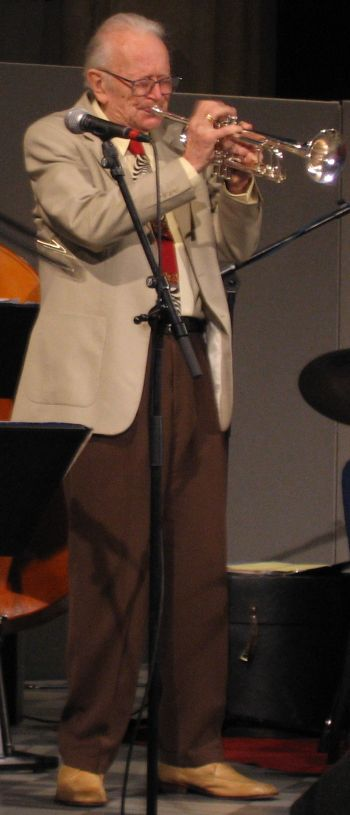
The jazz trumpeter Humphrey Lyttelton (pictured 2006) and his band performed on "Life in a Glasshouse".

"Like Spinning Plates" was the result of an initial attempt at recording "I Will" in a synthesiser arrangement. Dismissing this recording as "dodgy Kraftwerk", Radiohead reversed it and created a new song around it. Yorke said: "I was in another room, heard the vocal melody coming backwards, and thought, 'That's miles better than the right way round', then spent the rest of the night trying to learn the melody." Radiohead recorded "I Will" in a different arrangement for their next album, Hail to the Thief (2003).

For the final track, "Life in a Glasshouse", Jonny Greenwood wrote to the jazz trumpeter Humphrey Lyttelton, explaining that Radiohead were "a bit stuck". Lyttelton agreed to perform on the song with his band after his daughter showed him Radiohead's 1997 album OK Computer. According to Lyttelton, Radiohead "didn't want it to sound like a slick studio production but a slightly exploratory thing of people playing as if they didn't have it all planned out in advance". The recording session lasted seven hours, and left Lyttelton exhausted. "I detected some sort of eye-rolling at the start of the session, as if to say we were miles apart," he said. "They went through quite a few nervous breakdowns during the course of it all, just through trying to explain to us all what they wanted."

== Music and lyrics ==
Amnesiac was described as experimental rock, electronica and alternative rock, with elements of jazz. Simon Reynolds described it as post-rock. Colin Greenwood said it contained "traditional Radiohead-type songs" alongside more experimental work, and said that in both albums "the guitar becomes one more texture, difficult to separate from other textures". The Atlantic contrasted Amnesiac with "the surgical glint" of Kid A, with "swampy and foggy" arrangements and "uneasy" chords and rhythms. Uncut wrote that, whereas Kid A sounded futuristic, Amnesiac references music that predates rock, particularly the work of jazz musicians such as Miles Davis, Charlie Mingus and Chet Baker. In The Independent, Nick Hasted wrote that it "re-engaged with anger and activism" after the "glacial beauty" of Kid A.

"Pyramid Song"
"Pyramid Song" features piano, strings and an irregular rhythm.

The first track, "Packt Like Sardines in a Crushd Tin Box", is an electronic song with synthesisers and metallic percussion. "Pyramid Song", a swung ballad with piano and strings, was inspired by the Mingus song "Freedom". Its lyrics were inspired by an exhibition of ancient Egyptian underworld art Yorke attended while the band was recording in Copenhagen and ideas of cyclical time discussed by Stephen Hawking and Buddhism. "Pulk/Pull Revolving Doors" is an abrasive electronic track.

Yorke said "You and Whose Army?" was "about someone who is elected into power by people and who then blatantly betrays them – just like Blair did". The song builds slowly on piano, before reaching a climax in the final minute. According to O'Brien, "In the Radiohead of old, on OK Computer, that break would have lasted four minutes. We would have carried on 'Hey Jude'-style." "I Might Be Wrong" combines a "venomous" guitar riff with a "trance-like metallic beat". Colin Greenwood's bassline was inspired by the Chic bassist Bernard Edwards. The lyrics were influenced by advice given to Yorke by his partner, Rachel Owen: "Be proud of what you've done. Don't look back and just carry on like nothing's happened. Just let the bad stuff go." "Knives Out", described as the most conventional song, features "drifting" guitar lines, "driving" percussion, a "wandering" bassline, "haunting" vocals and "eerie" lyrics.

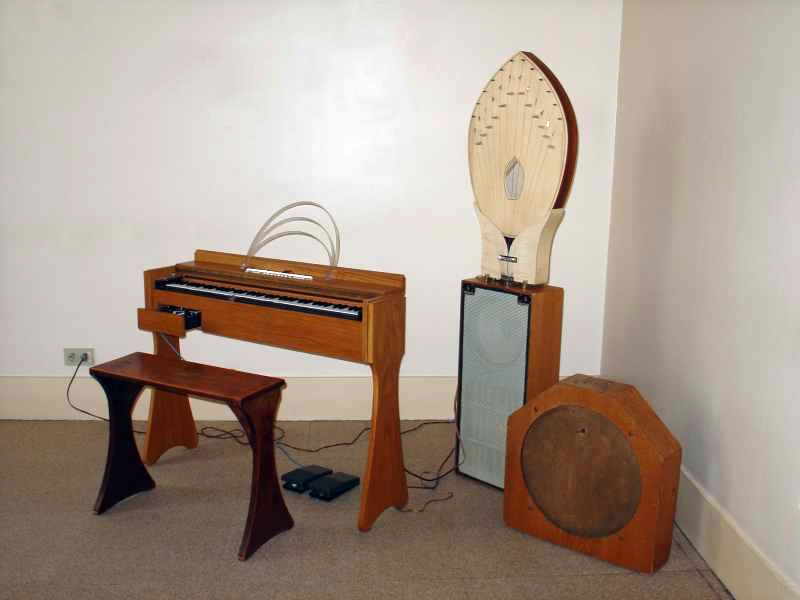
Jonny Greenwood used the ondes Martenot, an early electronic instrument. Its resonating palme diffuseur loudspeaker (pictured centre) was used to treat the vocals on "You and Whose Army?".

"Morning Bell/Amnesiac" is an alternative version of "Morning Bell" from Kid A; The Atlantic described it as a blend of "cosiness and nausea". O'Brien said that Radiohead often record and abandon different versions of songs, but that this version was "strong enough to bear hearing again". Yorke wrote that it was included "because it came from such a different place ... Because we only found it again by accident after having forgotten about it. Because it sounds like a recurring dream." He said the lyrics for "Dollars and Cents" were "gibberish", but were inspired by the notion that "people are basically just pixels on a screen, unknowingly serving this higher power which is manipulative and destructive".

"Hunting Bears" is a short instrumental on electric guitar and synthesiser. "Life in a Glasshouse" features the Humphrey Lyttelton Band playing in the style of a New Orleans jazz funeral. According to Lyttelton, the song starts with "ad-libbed, bluesy, minor-key meandering, then it gradually gets so that we're sort of playing real wild, primitive, New Orleans blues stuff". The lyrics were inspired by a news story Yorke read of a celebrity's wife so harassed by paparazzi that she papered her windows with their photographs.

== Artwork and packaging ==
The Amnesiac artwork was created by Yorke and the longtime Radiohead collaborator Stanley Donwood. For inspiration, Donwood explored London taking notes, likening the city to the labyrinth of Greek mythology. He scanned blank pages of old books and superimposed onto them photos of fireworks and Tokyo tower blocks, copies of Piranesi's Imaginary Prisons drawings, and lyrics and phrases printed by Yorke on a broken typewriter.

The Minotaur of Greek mythology is a motif of the Amnesiac artwork, and represents the "maze" Yorke felt he had become lost in during his depression after OK Computer. Donwood described it as a "tragic figure", at once monstrous and self-pitying. Other figures included in the album booklet include faceless terrorists, self-serving politicians and corporate executives. Yorke said they represented "the abstracted, semi-comical, stupidly dark, false voices that battled us as we tried to work".

For the special edition, Donwood designed a package with a hardback CD case in the style of a mislaid library book. He imagined that "someone made these pages in a book and it went into drawer in a desk and was forgotten about in the attic ... And visually and musically the album is about finding the book and opening the pages." The special edition won a Grammy Award for Best Recording Package at the 44th Grammy Awards.

== Release ==
Radiohead announced Amnesiac on their website in January 2001, three months after the release of Kid A. It was released in Japan on 30 May by EMI, in the UK on 4 June by Parlophone and in the US on 5 June by Capitol, both subsidiaries of EMI. Amnesiac debuted at number one on the UK Albums Chart. On the US Billboard 200, it debuted at number two, with sales of 231,000, surpassing the 207,000 first-week sales of Kid A. It is certified gold in Japan for shipments of 100,000 copies. By October 2008, Amnesiac had sold more than 900,000 copies worldwide. In July 2013, it was certified platinum in the UK for sales of more than 300,000. As of May 2016, it had sold more than 1 million digital copies.

== Promotion ==
Radiohead released no singles from Kid A, as Yorke wanted to avoid the stress of publicity he had struggled with on OK Computer. He regretted the choice, feeling it meant much of the early judgement of the album came from critics, and said Amnesiac would have more promotion. "Pyramid Song" was released as a single in May, followed by "Knives Out" in July, backed by music videos. Two videos were created for "I Might Be Wrong", which was released as a promotional single in June.

"Pulk/Pull Revolving Doors" and "Like Spinning Plates" were combined for a computer-animated video directed by Johnny Hardstaff. The video premiered on November 29, 2001, at an animation festival at the Centre For Contemporary Arts, Glasgow. It features imagery of killer whales swimming under UV light, a machine taking shape and conjoined babies spinning in a centrifuge. The video received little airplay from MTV, who felt it was "of a sensitive nature" and would only broadcast it with a warning. Hardstaff said: "The irony is that you can't move on MTV for bland R&B and the empty boasts of 'artists' effectively fixated with their own flaccid showbiz cocks, but any piece of film with an ounce of real emotion isn't going to get seen."

Radiohead enlisted the software company ActiveBuddy to create GooglyMinotaur, a chatbot that used the AOL Instant Messenger network. It launched on the day of the Amnesiac release. By November 2001, it was on 387,000 buddy lists and had received more than 36 million messages. It was deactivated in March 2002.

=== Tour ===
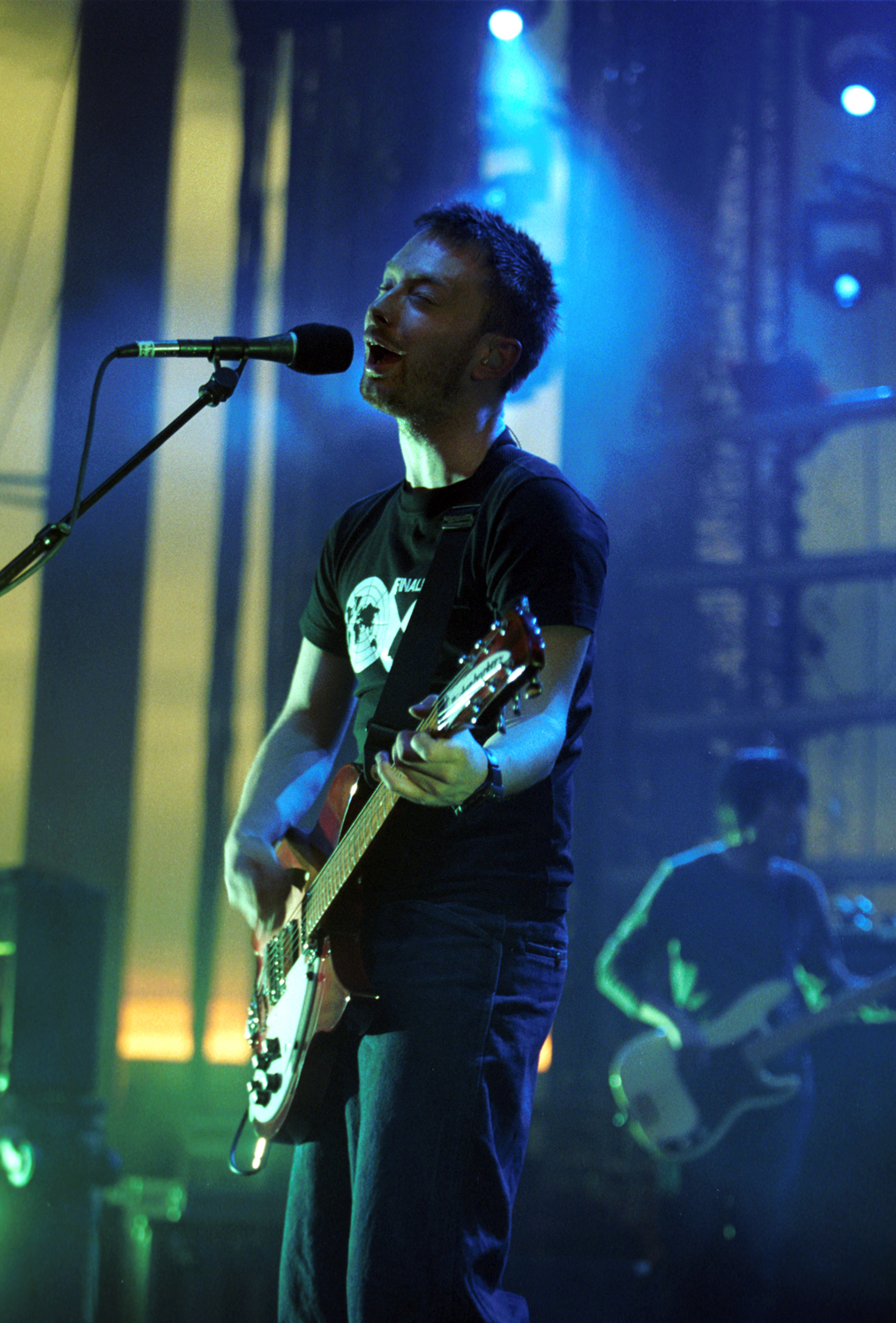
Yorke in 2001

Radiohead first performed Amnesiac songs on the Kid A tour, which began in June 2000. They rearranged the electronic tracks using rock instrumentation. For example, "Like Spinning Plates" was rearranged as a piano ballad. Yorke said: "Even with electronics, there is an element of spontaneous performance in using them ... It was the tension between what's human and what's coming from the machines. That was stuff we were getting into, as we learned how to play the songs from Kid A and Amnesiac live."

On 10 June 2001, Radiohead recorded a performance for a special hour-long episode of the BBC television programme Later... with Jools Holland, including a performance of "Life in a Glasshouse" with the Humphrey Lyttelton Band. The Amnesiac tour began on 18 June, with Radiohead's first North American tour in three years. It comprised concerts in west coast amphitheatres in June, followed by concerts in the east and midwest in August. The openers were the Beta Band and Kid Koala. Capitol avoided traditional promotion for the tour and instead disseminated information to Radiohead's large online fanbase. Tickets sold out within minutes. The Observer described this as "the most sweeping conquest of America by a British group" since Beatlemania, succeeding where bands such as Oasis had failed.

Radiohead hoped to tour the US using a custom-built tent as they had for the Kid A tour in Europe, but met opposition from Clear Channel Entertainment and Ticketmaster, which Yorke said had a monopoly on American live music. Radiohead considered abandoning touring in the US, but felt this would have been a defeat. They instead chose unusual venues, such as Grant Park in Chicago and the bank of the Hudson River in New York. The electronic musician Christoph de Babalon supported them in Europe.

In July, Radiohead performed in South Park, Oxford, with supporting performances by Lyttelton, Beck, Sigur Rós and Supergrass. It was Radiohead's first performance in Oxford, their hometown, since 1996, and was attended by 42,000 people. According to the journalist Alex Ross, it may have been the largest public gathering in Oxford history. The concert raised £145,000, which Radiohead donated to local charities including Samaritans and the Orchestra of St John's, which had performed on Kid A and Amnesiac. Recordings from the Kid A and Amnesiac tours were released on I Might Be Wrong: Live Recordings in November 2001.

== Reception ==
Professional ratings
Aggregate scores
Source	Rating
Metacritic	75/100
Review scores
Source	Rating
AllMusic	4.5/5 stars
Entertainment Weekly	C+
The Guardian	4/5 stars
Los Angeles Times	3.5/4 stars
NME	8/10
Pitchfork	9.0/10
Q	4/5 stars
Rolling Stone	3.5/5 stars
The Rolling Stone Album Guide	4.5/5 stars
Spin	7/10

After Radiohead's previous album, Kid A, had divided listeners, many hoped Amnesiac would return to their earlier rock sound. The Guardian titled its review "Relax: it's nothing like Kid A". However, Rolling Stone saw Amnesiac as a further distancing from Radiohead's earlier style, and Pitchfork found that it was nothing like their 1995 album The Bends. Stylus wrote that although Amnesiac was "slightly more straightforward" than Kid A, it "solidified the postmillennial model of Radiohead: less songs and more atmosphere, more eclectic and electronic, more paranoid, more threatening, more sublime". Yorke felt Amnesiac was no more accessible than Kid A and would have elicited the same reactions had it been released first. In 2020, the Guardian wrote that "the impenetrable Amnesiac debunked industry rumours that Radiohead were primed for a bankable comeback".

On the review aggregate site Metacritic, Amnesiac has a rating of 75 out of 100 based on 25 reviews, indicating "generally favourable reviews". Robert Hilburn of the Los Angeles Times felt that Amnesiac, compared to Kid A, was "a richer, more engaging record, its austerity and troubled vision enriched by a rousing of the human spirit". The Guardian critic Alexis Petridis, who had disliked Kid A, felt that Amnesiac returned Radiohead to "their role as the world's most intriguing and innovative major rock band ... [It] strikes a cunning and rewarding balance between experimentation and quality control. It's hardly easy to digest but nor is it impossible to swallow." He praised the "haunting musical shifts and unconventional melodies", but found the electronic tracks "Pulk/Pull Revolving Doors" and "Like Spinning Plates" self-indulgent. Stylus wrote that Amnesiac was "an excellent disc", but was not as "exploratory or interesting" as Kid A.

Some dismissed Amnesiac as a collection of Kid A outtakes. The Pitchfork founder, Ryan Schreiber, wrote that its "questionable sequencing ... does little to hush the argument that the record is merely a thinly veiled B-sides compilation". Another Pitchfork writer, Scott Plagenhoef, felt the sequencing worked by creating tension, heightening the power of the more experimental tracks. However, he felt the more conventional marketing created a sense of "ordinariness" compared to Kid A and the impression that Radiohead had bowed to pressure from their record label.

Some critics felt Amnesiac was less cohesive than Kid A. The AllMusic critic Stephen Thomas Erlewine wrote that it "often plays as a hodgepodge", and that both albums "clearly derive from the same source and have the same flaws ... The division only makes the two records seem unfocused, even if the best of both records is quite stunning." Another AllMusic critic, Sam Samuelson, said Amnesiac was a "thrown-together" release that might have been better packaged with the live album I Might Be Wrong as a "complete Kid A sessions package". Schreiber felt the "highlights were undeniably worth the wait, and easily overcome its occasional patchiness".

=== Accolades ===
Amnesiac was nominated for the 2001 Mercury Prize, losing to PJ Harvey's Stories from the City, Stories from the Sea, for which Yorke provided guest vocals. It was the fourth consecutive Radiohead album nominated for a Grammy Award for Best Alternative Music Album, and the special edition won a Grammy Award for Best Recording Package at the 44th Grammy Awards.

The Los Angeles Times, Q, The Wire, Rolling Stone, Kludge, The Village Voice, and Alternative Press named Amnesiac one of the best albums of 2001. In 2005, Stylus named it the best album of the preceding five years. In 2009, Pitchfork ranked Amnesiac the 34th-best album of the 2000s and Rolling Stone ranked it the 25th. It is included in the 2005 book 1001 Albums You Must Hear Before You Die, and number 320 in the 2012 edition of Rolling Stone's "500 Greatest Albums of All Time" list. "Pyramid Song" was ranked among the best tracks of the decade by Rolling Stone, NME and Pitchfork.

=== Later appraisal ===
Writing in The Independent in 2003, Nick Hasted wrote that, with Amnesiac, Radiohead became "the single popular political band, absorbing experience of burgeoning street protest to spit veiled threats at Blair". He argued that they "were the musical wing of a new counterculture", as David Bowie, the Beatles, Pink Floyd and the Clash and been before them. Reviewing the 2009 reissue of Amnesiac for Pitchfork, Plagenhoef wrote: "More than Kid A – and maybe more than any other LP of its time – Amnesiac is the kickoff of a messy, rewarding era ... disconnected, self-aware, tense, eclectic, head-turning – an overload of good ideas inhibited by rules, restrictions, and conventional wisdom."

In 2016, Dorian Lynskey wrote in The Guardian that Kid A and Amnesiac were "spotty" and that Radiohead should have released the strongest tracks from both as a single album. Writing for its 20th anniversary in 2021, The Atlantic wrote that Amnesiac might be Radiohead's best work: "Listening to it 20 years after its release, the album's grumpy wisdom — its dignity in the face of dread — feels more moving than ever." In 2024, Consequence wrote that Amnesiac was less universal than OK Computer and less focused and cohesive than Kid A, but was a "rosetta stone for understanding Radiohead as a whole", with its combination of ballads, rock, electronica and strings.

== Reissues ==
Radiohead left EMI after their contract ended in 2003. In 2007, EMI released Radiohead Box Set, a compilation of albums recorded while Radiohead were signed to EMI, including Amnesiac. After a period of being out of print on vinyl, Amnesiac was reissued as a double LP on 19 August 2008 as part of the "From the Capitol Vaults" series, along with other Radiohead albums.

On 25 August, EMI reissued Amnesiac in a two-CD "Collector's Edition" and a "Special Collector's Edition" containing an additional DVD. The first CD contains the original studio album; the second CD collects B-sides from Amnesiac singles and live performances; the DVD contains music videos and a live television performance. Radiohead had no input into the reissues and the music was not remastered. The EMI reissues were discontinued after Radiohead's back catalogue was transferred to XL Recordings in 2016. In May 2016, XL reissued Radiohead's back catalogue on vinyl, including Amnesiac.

An early demo of "Life in a Glasshouse", performed by Yorke on acoustic guitar, was released on the 2019 compilation MiniDiscs [Hacked]. On November 5, 2021, Radiohead released Kid A Mnesia, an anniversary reissue compiling Kid A and Amnesiac. It includes a third album, Kid Amnesiae, comprising previously unreleased material from the sessions. Radiohead promoted the reissue with two digital singles, the previously unreleased tracks "If You Say the Word" and "Follow Me Around".

Kid A Mnesia Exhibition, an interactive experience with music and artwork from Kid A and Amnesiac, was released on 18 November for PlayStation 5, macOS and Windows. A physical installation, Motion Picture House: Kid A Mnesia, opened at the 2026 Coachella festival in California and is set to tour the US.

== Track listing ==
All tracks are written by Radiohead.

No.	Title	Length
1.	"Packt Like Sardines in a Crushd Tin Box"	4:00
2.	"Pyramid Song"	4:49
3.	"Pulk/Pull Revolving Doors"	4:07
4.	"You and Whose Army?"	3:11
5.	"I Might Be Wrong"	4:54
6.	"Knives Out"	4:15
7.	"Morning Bell/Amnesiac"	3:14
8.	"Dollars and Cents"	4:52
9.	"Hunting Bears"	2:01
10.	"Like Spinning Plates"	3:57
11.	"Life in a Glasshouse"	4:31
Total length:		43:57

== Personnel ==
Adapted from the Amnesiac liner notes and Apple Music credits.

=== Radiohead ===
- Colin Greenwood – bass guitar (all tracks), double bass and drums (4)
- Jonny Greenwood – bass guitar (1), guitar (2, 5—10), ondes Martnot (4), keyboards (7), synthesiser (9, 10)
- Ed O'Brien – guitar (all tracks except 10), keyboards (4)
- Philip Selway – drums (1, 2, 4—8), percussion (1, 7, 10), guitar (4)
- Thom Yorke – vocals (all tracks except 9), piano (1, 4, 11), guitar (4, 9), keyboards (7, 9), loops (3)

=== Additional musicians ===
- Nigel Godrich – programming
- The Orchestra of St John's – strings ("Pyramid Song", "Dollars and Cents")
  - John Lubbock – conducting
- The Humphrey Lyttelton Band ("Life in a Glasshouse")
  - Humphrey Lyttelton – trumpet, bandleader
  - Jimmy Hastings – clarinet
  - Pete Strange – trombone
  - Paul Bridge – double bass
  - Adrian Macintosh – drums

=== Technical personnel ===
- Nigel Godrich – production, engineering
- Radiohead – production
- Dan Grech-Marguerat – engineering ("Life in a Glasshouse")
- Gerard Navarro – engineering assistance
- Graeme Stewart – engineering assistance
- Bob Ludwig – mastering

=== Artwork ===
- Stanley Donwood – pictures, design
- Thom Yorke (credited as "Tchocky") – pictures

== Charts ==
=== Weekly charts ===
Weekly chart performance for Amnesiac
Chart (2001)	Peak position
Australian Albums (ARIA)	2
Austrian Albums (Ö3 Austria)	1
Belgian Albums (Ultratop Flanders)	4
Belgian Albums (Ultratop Wallonia)	3
Canadian Albums (Billboard)	1
Danish Albums (Hitlisten)	2
Dutch Albums (Album Top 100)	3
Finnish Albums (Suomen virallinen lista)	1
French Albums (SNEP)	2
German Albums (Offizielle Top 100)	2
Hungarian Albums (MAHASZ)	26
Japanese Albums (Oricon)	6
Irish Albums (IRMA)	1
Italian Albums (FIMI)	2
New Zealand Albums (RMNZ)	1
Polish Albums (ZPAV)	3
Scottish Albums (Official Charts)	1
Spanish Albums (AFYVE)	13
Swedish Albums (Sverigetopplistan)	4
Swiss Albums (Schweizer Hitparade)	6
UK Albums (Official Charts)	1
US Billboard 200	2

=== Year-end charts ===
Year-end chart performance for Amnesiac
Chart (2001)	Position
Belgian Albums (Ultratop Wallonia)	77
Canadian Albums (Nielsen SoundScan)	58
Dutch Albums (Album Top 100)	88
European Albums (Music & Media)	69
French Albums (SNEP)	56
UK Albums (OCC)	80
US Billboard 200	139

== Certifications ==
Certifications for Amnesiac
Region	Certification	Certified units/sales
Argentina (CAPIF)	Gold	20,000^{^}
Australia (ARIA)	Gold	35,000^{^}
Belgium (BRMA)	Gold	25,000^{*}
Canada (Music Canada)	Platinum	100,000^{^}
France (SNEP)	Gold	100,000^{*}
Japan (RIAJ)	Gold	100,000^{^}
United Kingdom (BPI)	Platinum	331,000
United States (RIAA)	Gold	1,020,000
Summaries
Europe (IFPI)	Platinum	1,000,000^{*}
^{*} Sales figures based on certification alone.^{^} Shipments figures based on certification alone.
