= Robert Hoffer =

American businessman

Robert Hoffer is an American businessman who for the past 25 years has primarily worked in technology and software. He initially developed and launched one of the first online yellow pages. Hoffer is also credited with developing instant messaging agents and web-based scratch-off games. Over the course of his career, he has worked for and consulted for many large corporations, including Apple Computer, AOL, Xerox, PepsiCo, Playboy, Citibank, and Lipton.

== Inventions ==
Hoffer often promotes the message that "everything old is new again," – arguing that many of today's inventions are simply repackaged versions of old ideas. This may be the driving force behind his work as co-founder of several Internet companies, including InfoSpace Corp., an Internet directory services provider; Query Labs, offering third-party directory services to newspapers and media firms; and Typo.net, which launched the hotly debated concept of interstitial advertising. His vision is often credited with bringing products to market that are used today by millions of people and have been purchased by companies like Yahoo, Microsoft, and others, for millions of dollars. For example, in 1995, Hoffer was instrumental in bringing the first web-based national Yellow and White Pages online, which were later licensed and co-branded with Yahoo, Nynex, American Express, Excite@Home, Lycos, and others.

== Patents ==
As the co-founder of Colloquis in 2000, Hoffer created the first commercially viable online robot for instant messaging, securing a controversial patent for the technology. In 2006, Microsoft purchased ActiveBuddy (now Colloquis) for $46 million.
