= Online scratch card =

Form of online gambling

Online scratch cards are the on-line version of the lottery scratch cards that are usually purchased at stands. Online scratch cards are played by clicking on designated areas to reveal information used to determine the card’s prize value. The company providing the game is responsible for determining the chance of winning. Online scratch cards are sanctioned by the National Lottery in the United Kingdom.

== Types of card ==
The cards can be divided into two groups: web-based scratch cards and download-based scratch cards; some companies offer both.

=== Web-based online scratch cards ===
These are the most common form. For these, the website users may directly play without loading any software to the local computer. Games are presented in the browser plugin Flash and require browser support for this plugin. The latest technology also allows for non-lottery usage such as virtual fundraisers where the online scratch card is used to attract attention to a cause and to act as a vehicle for donations. Social networking sites can likewise be posted to by using the new widget auto posting tools now freely available. Many programs are free and can be easily emailed, blogged, and posted within social sites.

=== Download-based online scratch cards ===
On these websites, users must download software to play. After installing the software, it connects to the online card service provider and handles contact without browser support.

== Companies ==
There are many companies who offer online scratch cards. In 2011, it was announced that American slot machine manufacturer International Game Technology entered into partnership with Neogames to supply their slot machine game themes for online scratch cards.

== Proceeds ==
In the United Kingdom and the Isle of Man, the National Lottery donates profits from online scratch cards to various charity and non-profit organizations.

== Criticism ==
Some people are critical of online scratch cards as they say they market different themes that are considered “retro children’s games” such as Mousetrap and Connect 4. Camelot, the lottery provider for the National Lottery, has defended against this assertion by stating that these themes are retro and do not appeal to a modern fourteen- or fifteen-year-old.

Online scratch cards are also common for fraud as it deals with virtual gaming. In the most common cases of player fraud, the player signs up for multiple accounts on a card site using fake names to repeat the bonus more than once. Online scratch card companies do not tolerate such behavior and will usually lock the accounts of the player responsible, and may inform other scratch card sites or the software provider to keep the player out of other scratch card sites.

== See also ==
- Online gambling
- The National Lottery
