= Christopher O'Riley =

American musician

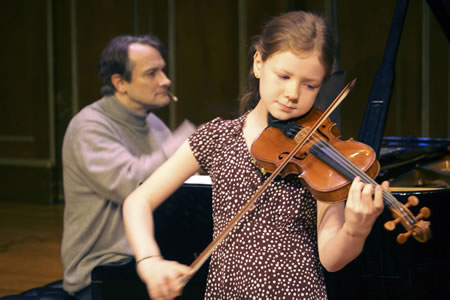
- O'Riley (back) accompanying violinist Alice Ivy-Pemberton, 2009

Background information
- Born: 1956 (age 69–70); Chicago, Illinois, United States
- Genres: Classical
- Occupations: Pianist, radio host
- Instrument: Piano
- Website: www.christopheroriley.com

Christopher O'Riley is an American classical pianist and public radio show host. He was the host of the weekly National Public Radio program From the Top. O'Riley is also known for his piano arrangements of songs by alternative musicians.

== Early life ==
O'Riley was born in 1956 in Chicago, Illinois, United States, and grew up in Evanston, Illinois. He began classical piano studies at the age of 4, and became interested in pop music and started his own band in 6th grade. His dual-track musical interests led him to jazz-rock fusion and included a professional performance in his later high school years with the Pittsburgh alto sax player Eric Kloss. His choice of music school was fortuitous as the New England Conservatory of Music had as its president in the 1970s the composer/historian Gunther Schuller. It was upon entering NEC that O'Riley decided to pursue classical studies exclusively.

== Career ==
In 1981, he won the Young Concert Artists International Auditions. He has received awards at the Leeds, Van Cliburn, Busoni and Montreal competitions, as well as an Avery Fisher Career Grant. O'Riley has made many recordings of classical music. His debut album, a collection of the works of Ferruccio Busoni, including the seldom performed Fantasia Contrappuntistica, was released in 1983. He has since released several recordings, including works of Maurice Ravel, Sergei Rachmaninoff, Jean-Philippe Rameau, John Adams, Igor Stravinsky, and Alexander Scriabin, as well as a recording of Rhapsody in Blue with the Royal Philharmonic Orchestra.

O'Riley is the former host of the weekly National Public Radio program From the Top, on which young musicians are heard and interviewed. According to its website, it is the most popular weekly one-hour classical music show on the air today. O'Riley first began performing Radiohead songs as a time-filler during a break in the program, to supplement preludes and miniatures by composers such as Debussy and Rachmaninoff. Many of those short classical pieces are found on his CD release At the Break. Initially designed as a media platform for all manner of young musicians, From The Top soon became exclusively dedicated to Classical music, and it was in this atmosphere that O'Riley decided to augment the format by inserting, unannounced, his own arrangements, presumably Classical pieces, of Radiohead songs. When listeners were apprised of the title and provenance of the pieces, emails came into the show asking "Who is this Mr. Head and where can I find more of his beautiful music?"

True Love Waits: Christopher O'Riley Plays Radiohead, his recording of his own piano arrangements of songs by the alternative rock band Radiohead, was released in 2003. O'Riley's second Radiohead-derived album, Hold Me To This, followed two years later and contains a different selection of songs. Both albums had moderate success on the classical crossover charts. In 2006, he released a piano tribute to Elliott Smith, Home to Oblivion, again featuring his own arrangements.

O'Riley says that his renditions have introduced the music of Radiohead to a classical audience as well as introducing classical music to a wider or younger audience, as he sometimes performs both standard concert repertoire, such as Shostakovich or Mozart, and Radiohead, Elliott Smith or Nick Drake interpretations at the same concert. O'Riley describes himself as an obsessed Radiohead fan in interviews, and says he was attracted to the multilayered nature of the band's music, leading him to listen to and transcribe lesser known album tracks, live bootleg recordings of performances, b-sides, and even songs never officially released, as well as some of their hit singles. In his liner notes for Home to Oblivion, he calls Elliott Smith "the most important songwriter since Cole Porter," although admitting he was unaware of Smith's music until his apparent suicide in 2003. When asked to explain his unusual choice of material for a classical pianist, O'Riley has often quoted Duke Ellington's statement that "there are two kinds of music. Good music, and the other kind."

O'Riley's work has often been distinguished from other classical rock-tribute albums by music critics, who note O'Riley's quality of playing. True Love Waits received 4 out of 5 stars from Rolling Stone magazine, allegedly the only "classical" recording to do so, while his Radiohead concert programs have received generally favorable notices from classical critics and promotion on NPR's Performance Today.

== Personal life ==
O'Riley currently resides in Los Angeles, California. His son, Conor Redmond O'Riley, was born on June 30, 1994, to Chris and his then wife, Marlene Fusaris.

== Discography ==
Release date	Album	Label
October 1, 2001	Christopher O'Riley at the Break	From the Top Records
June 10, 2003	True Love Waits: Christopher O'Riley Plays Radiohead	Sony
April 12, 2005	Hold Me to This: Christopher O'Riley Plays Radiohead	World Village Records; IODA
April 11, 2006	Home to Oblivion: An Elliott Smith Tribute	World Village Records; IODA
April 10, 2007	Second Grace: The Music of Nick Drake	World Village Records; IODA
August 18, 2009	Out of My Hands	White Tie Records
September 27, 2011	Shuffle.Play.Listen	Oxingale Productions
May 7, 2013	O'Riley's Liszt	Oxingale Productions
February 1, 2015	Beethoven, Period. Complete Sonatas and variations for Pianoforte and Violoncello. Recorded on period instruments.Matt Haimovitz, Christopher O'Riley.	PENTATONE
February 1, 2016	Shuffle. Play. Listen. Works by Igor Stravinsky, Leoš Janáček, Bernard Herrmann, Bohuslav Martinů, Astor Piazzolla. Matt Haimovitz, Christopher O'Riley.	PENTATONE
September 29, 2017	PENTATONE OXINGALE SERIES "Troika". Works by Sergei Prokofiev, Dmitri Shostakovich, Sergei Rachmaninov. Matt Haimovitz, Christopher O'Riley.	PENTATONE
January 30, 2026	The Bach Dialogues	PENTATONE
