= SmarterChild =

Chatbot on AOL instant messenger

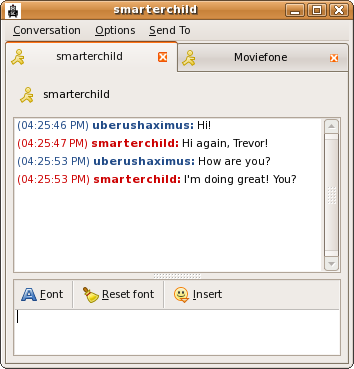
A user chatting with SmarterChild

SmarterChild was a chatbot available on AOL Instant Messenger and Windows Live Messenger (previously MSN Messenger) networks.

== History ==
SmarterChild was an apparently intelligent agent or "bot" developed by ActiveBuddy, Inc., with offices in New York and Sunnyvale. It was widely distributed across global instant messaging networks. SmarterChild became very popular, attracting over 30 million Instant Messenger "buddies" on AIM (AOL), MSN and Yahoo Messenger over the course of its lifetime.

Founded in 2000, ActiveBuddy was the brainchild of Robert Hoffer and Timothy Kay, who later brought seasoned advertising executive Peter Levitan on board as CEO. The concept for conversational instant messaging bots came from the founder's vision to add natural language comprehension functionality to the increasingly popular AIM instant messaging application. The original implementation took shape as a demo that Kay programmed in Perl in his Los Altos garage to connect a single buddy name, "ActiveBuddy", to look up stock symbols, and later allow AIM users to play Colossal Cave Adventure, a word-based adventure game, and MIT's Boris Katz Start Question Answering System but quickly grew to include a wide range of database applications the company called 'knowledge domains' including instant access to news, weather, stock information, movie times, yellow pages listings, and detailed sports data, as well as a variety of tools (personal assistant, calculators, translator, etc.). None of the individual domains which the company had named “stocksBuddy”, “sportsBuddy”, etc. ever launched publicly.

When Stephen Klein came on board as COO — and eventually CEO — he insisted that all of the disparate test “buddies” be launched together with the company’s highly-developed colloquial chat domain. He suggested using “SmarterChild”, a username coined by Tim Kay which Tim was using to test various things. The bundled domains were launched publicly as SmarterChild (on AIM initially) in June 2001. SmarterChild provided information wrapped in fun and quirky conversation. The company generated no revenue from SmarterChild, but used it as a demonstration of the power of what Klein called “conversational computing”. The company subsequently marketed Automated Service Agents—delivering immediate answers to customer service inquiries—-to large corporations, like Comcast, Cingular, TimeWarner Cable, etc.

SmarterChild's popularity spawned targeted marketing-oriented bots for Radiohead, Austin Powers, Intel, Keebler, The Sporting News and others. ActiveBuddy co-founders, Kay and Hoffer, as co-inventors, were issued two controversial U.S. patents in 2002.

ActiveBuddy changed its name to Colloquis (briefly Conversagent) and targeted development of consumer-facing enterprise customer service agents, which the company marketed as Automated Service Agents. Microsoft acquired Colloquis in October 2006 and subsequently discontinued both SmarterChild and the Automated Service Agent business.

Robert Hoffer, ActiveBuddy co-founder, licensed the technology from Microsoft after Microsoft abandoned the Colloquis technology.
