= Colloquis =

American AI company

- Type: Subsidiary
- Industry: Software Development
- Predecessor: ActiveBuddy; Conversagent
- Founded: 2000; 26 years ago
- Founder: Peter Levitan; Robert Hoffer; Timothy Kay
- Products: SmarterChild
- Parent: Microsoft Corporation

Colloquis, previously known as ActiveBuddy and Conversagent, was a company that created conversation-based interactive agents originally distributed via instant messaging platforms. The company had offices in New York, New York, and Sunnyvale, California.

== History ==
Founded in 2000, the company was the brainchild of Robert Hoffer, Timothy Kay, and Peter Levitan. The idea for interactive agents (also known as Internet bots) came from the team's vision to add functionality to increasingly popular instant messaging services. The original implementation took shape as a word-based adventure game but quickly grew to include a wide range of database applications, including access to news, weather, stock information, movie times, Yellow Pages listings, and detailed sports data, as well as a variety of tools (calculators, translator, etc.). These various applications were bundled into one entity and launched as SmarterChild in 2001. SmarterChild acted as a showcase for the quick data access and possibilities for fun conversation that the company planned to turn into customized, niche-specific products.

The rapid success of SmarterChild led to targeted promotional products for Radiohead, Austin Powers, The Sporting News, and others. ActiveBuddy sought to strengthen its hold on the interactive agent market for the future by filing for, and receiving, a controversial patent on their creation in 2002. The company also released the BuddyScript SDK, a free developer kit that allow programmers to design and launch their own interactive agents using ActiveBuddy's proprietary scripting language, in 2002. Ultimately, however, the decline in ad spending in 2001 and 2002 led to a shift in corporate strategy towards business focused Automated Service Agents, building products for clients including Cingular, Comcast and Cox Communications. The company subsequently changed its name from ActiveBuddy to Conversagent in 2003, and then again to Colloquis in 2006. Colloquis was purchased by Microsoft in October 2006.
