= 7 Television Commercials =

Video by Radiohead
- Released: 4 May 1998 (VHS); 4 August 2003 (DVD)
- Recorded: 1995–1998
- Genre: Alternative rock
- Length: 34:03
- Label: Parlophone (EMI)

Radiohead chronology
Live at the Astoria (1995)	7 Television Commercials (1998)	Meeting People Is Easy (1998)

Professional ratings
Review scores
Source	Rating
Allmusic	4/5 stars
Allmovie	3/5 stars
Rolling Stone	2/4 stars

7 Television Commercials is a collection of music videos by the English rock band Radiohead, covering the period from The Bends (1995) to OK Computer (1997).

== Release ==
The VHS edition was released on 4 May 1998 in the UK and 30 June in the US. The DVD was released on 4 August 2003 in the UK and 5 August in North America.

== Music videos ==
1. "Paranoid Android"
2. "Street Spirit (Fade Out)"
3. "No Surprises"
4. "Just"
5. "High and Dry" (U.S. version)
6. "Karma Police"
7. "Fake Plastic Trees"

== Critical reception ==
The reviewer Ian Reed felt that "it could have been better". Reed also commented on the duration of the video, just over 30 minutes, only seven music videos. Christian Hoard of Rolling Stone gave the re-release collection of videos 2 out of 4 stars, also mentioning the length of the release: "Why only seven? And no bonus material? You'd think that a band as wary of commercial exploitation as Radiohead wouldn't ask fans to shell out for so slight a souvenir."

== Personnel ==
All videos commissioned by Dilly Gent.

Packaging art and design by Stanley Donwood and the White Chocolate Farm.

- "Paranoid Android"
  Director: Magnus Carlsson
  Producer: Peter Gustaffson
  Production company: Wegelius Animation AB
- "Street Spirit (Fade Out)"
  Director: Jonathan Glazer
  Producer: Nick Morris
  Cinematography: Steve Keith-Roach
  Production company: Academy Music Video Ltd
- "No Surprises"
  Director: Grant Gee
  Producer: Phil Barnes
  Cinematography: Dan Landin
  Production company: Kudos (Music Video)
- "Just"
  Director: Jamie Thraves
  Producer: Niki Amos
  Cinematography: Alexander Seligman
  Production company: Oil Factory Inc
- "High and Dry" (U.S. version)
  Director: Paul Cunningham
  Producer: Myke Zykoff
  Cinematography: Adam Beckman
  Production company: Oil Factory Inc
- "Karma Police"
  Director: Jonathan Glazer
  Producer: Nick Morris
  Cinematography: Steve Keith-Roach
  Production company: Academy Music Video Ltd
- "Fake Plastic Trees"
  Director: Jake Scott
  Producer: Ellen Jacobson
  Cinematography: Salvatore Totino
  Production company: Black Dog Films (LA)
