= Lewis =

Lewis may refer to:

== Names ==
- Lewis (given name), including a list of people with the given name
- Lewis (surname), including a list of people with the surname

== Music ==
- Lewis (musician), Canadian singer
- "Lewis (Mistreated)", a song by Radiohead from My Iron Lung

== Places ==
- Lewis (crater), a crater on the far side of the Moon
- Isle of Lewis, the northern part of Lewis and Harris, Western Isles, Scotland

=== United States ===
- Lewis, Colorado
- Lewis, Indiana
- Lewis, Iowa
- Lewis, Kansas
- Lewis Wharf, Boston, Massachusetts
- Lewis, Missouri
- Lewis, Essex County, New York
- Lewis, Lewis County, New York
- Lewis, North Carolina
- Lewis, Vermont
- Lewis, Wisconsin

== Ships ==
- USS Lewis (1861), a sailing ship
- USS Lewis (DE-535), a destroyer escort in commission from 1944 to 1946

== Science ==
- Lewis structure, a diagram of a molecule that shows the bonding between the atoms
- Lewis acids and bases
- Lewis antigen system, a human blood group system
- Lewis number, a dimensionless number in fluid dynamics and transport phenomena
- Lewis rat, an inbred strain of laboratory rat

== Television ==
- Lewis (TV series), a British television detective series
- Lewis (The Simpsons), a character in The Simpsons

== Other uses ==
- Lewis (cat), a cat that was placed under house arrest
- Lewis (lifting appliance)
- Lewis (robot), a robotic wedding photographer
- Lewis (satellite), a failed NASA satellite mission
- HP Lewis, a CPU in certain Hewlett-Packard programmable calculators
- Lewis's, a chain of department stores in England and Scotland (1856-1990s), originating in Liverpool
- Lewis & Co, a firm of organ builders in Brixton, London from 1860 to 1919
- Lewis University, a private school in Romeoville, Illinois
- Lewis v. Harris, a New Jersey Supreme Court ruling on same-sex marriage

== See also ==
- Fort Lewis, Washington
- John Lewis & Partners, a department store in Great Britain
- John Lewis Partnership, an employee-owned UK company which operates John Lewis and Waitrose
- Justice Lewis (disambiguation)
- Lewes (disambiguation)
- Lewis and Clark-class dry cargo ship, a class of vessels
- Lewis and Harris, the largest island in Scotland
- Lewis Bridge (disambiguation)
- Lewis chessmen, medieval chess pieces discovered on the Isle of Lewis
- Lewis County (disambiguation)
- Lewis gun, a machine gun
- Lewis Island (disambiguation)
- Lewis River (disambiguation)
- Lewis Township (disambiguation)
- Lewis Township, Pennsylvania (disambiguation)
- Lewisburg (disambiguation)
- Lewisite
- Lewiston (disambiguation)
- Lewistown (disambiguation)
- Lewisville (disambiguation)
- Louis (disambiguation)
- Louise (disambiguation)
- Luas
- Luis (disambiguation)
- SS Lewis Hamilton, former name of the Indus
- USNS Lewis and Clark (T-AKE-1), a United States Navy dry cargo ship
- USS Lewis and Clark (SSBN-644), a United States Navy ballistic missile submarine
- USS Milton Lewis (DE-772), a United States Navy destroyer escort
