= Live at the Astoria =

Video by Radiohead
- Released: 13 March 1995 (VHS); 21 November 2005 (DVD)
- Recorded: 27 May 1994
- Venue: London Astoria
- Genre: Alternative rock
- Length: 66:53
- Label: Parlophone; PMI
- Director: Brett Turnbull
- Producer: Sarah Bayliss

Radiohead chronology
Live at the Astoria (1995)	7 Television Commercials (1998)

Live at the Astoria is a live concert video by the English rock band Radiohead, taken from their performance at the London Astoria on 27 May 1994. It was released on VHS in 1995, DVD in 2005 and YouTube in 2020.

== Content ==
Live at the Astoria features performances of songs from Radiohead's first two albums, Pablo Honey (1993) and The Bends (1995). The performance of "My Iron Lung" was used for The Bends, with Thom Yorke's vocals replaced and the audience removed.

== Release ==
Live at the Astoria was released on VHS on 13 March 1995, the same day as Radiohead's second album, The Bends. A DVD release followed in 2005. On 28 May 2020, Radiohead added Live at the Astoria to YouTube.

== Track list ==
1. "You" (3:48)
2. "Bones" (3:08)
3. "Ripcord" (3:17)
4. "Black Star" (3:44)
5. "Creep" (4:10)
6. "The Bends" (3:56)
7. "My Iron Lung" (5:06)
8. "Prove Yourself" (2:24)
9. "Maquiladora" (3:16)
10. "Vegetable" (3:14)
11. "Fake Plastic Trees" (4:29)
12. "Just" (3:43)
13. "Stop Whispering" (5:16)
14. "Anyone Can Play Guitar" (4:16)
15. "Street Spirit (Fade Out)" (4:24)
16. "Pop Is Dead" (2:22)
17. "Blow Out" (6:14)

== Personnel ==
All songs written by Radiohead and published by Warner Chappell Music Ltd.

- Thom Yorke — vocals, guitar
- Jonny Greenwood — guitar
- Colin Greenwood — bass guitar
- Ed O'Brien — guitar, backing vocals
- Philip Selway — drums
- Dianne Swann — keys on "Street Spirit (Fade Out)"
- Jim Warren — mixing
- Brett Turnbull — director
- Sarah Bayliss — producer
- Stanley Donwood and the White Chocolate Farm — artwork

== Certifications ==
Certifications and sales for Live at the Astoria
Region	Certification	Certified units/sales
Argentina (CAPIF)	Platinum	8,000^{^}
United Kingdom (BPI)	Gold	25,000^{*}
^{*} Sales figures based on certification alone.^{^} Shipments figures based on certification alone.
