= The Bends (song) =

1996 single by Radiohead

Single by Radiohead

from the album The Bends
- B-side: "My Iron Lung" (live); "Bones" (live)
- Written: 1992
- Released: 26 July 1996
- Recorded: July 1994
- Studio: The Manor (Oxfordshire)
- Genre: Alternative rock; hard rock; grunge
- Length: 4:06 (album version); 4:50 (demo version); 3:58 (Black Sessions version); 3:53 (Jools Holland version)
- Label: Parlophone
- Songwriters: Thom Yorke; Jonny Greenwood; Ed O'Brien; Colin Greenwood; Philip Selway
- Producer: John Leckie

Radiohead singles chronology
"Street Spirit (Fade Out)" (1996)	"The Bends" (1996)	"Paranoid Android" (1997)

Licensed audio
- "The Bends" on YouTube

"The Bends" is a song by the English rock band Radiohead from their second studio album, The Bends (1995). In Ireland, it was released by Parlophone on 26 July 1996 as the album's sixth and final single, reaching number 26 on the Irish Singles Chart.

Written in 1992 during the grunge era, "The Bends" predated the release of Radiohead's 1992 debut single, "Creep", and debut studio album, Pablo Honey (1993). A fan favourite, Radiohead performed it numerous times over the following two years before recording it at the Manor Studio in Oxfordshire, England, with the producer John Leckie. It remains one of Radiohead's most frequently performed songs.

"The Bends" has been compared to the work of bands such as Queen, the Beatles, Pixies, the Smiths, and Oasis; Radiohead's singer, Thom Yorke, described it as a "Bowie pastiche". The track consists of five sections, making it one of the most structurally complex songs on The Bends. Several critics interpreted the lyrics as a commentary on the success of "Creep", which had led the media to label Radiohead as a one-hit wonder. However, Yorke said the lyrics were intended to be humorous and had been misinterpreted.

The song was included on the greatest hits album Radiohead: The Best Of (2008), and other versions have appeared on compilations by Radiohead and other artists. In 2017, Uncut ranked it as the third-greatest Radiohead song, while NME placed its guitar solo as the seventh-greatest in music history.

== Writing ==
"The Bends" is one of the earliest songs written by Radiohead, originally titled "The Benz". It was primarily written by the singer, Thom Yorke, though credited to all band members, before the recording of their debut album, Pablo Honey (1993). In a 1995 interview, Yorke said: "['The Bends'] is one of those songs I was rambling around and just poured all this rubbish out into the song. Then it all started happening, which was a bit odd. I was completely taking the piss when I wrote it. Then the joke started wearing a bit thin." Radiohead also performed "The Bends" live (Note: For details, see Live performances section.) numerous times before its release. The bassist, Colin Greenwood, described it as a "perennial hardy annual of a live favourite, faithfully committed live to tape."

In 1992, Radiohead recorded an early 4-track demo of "The Bends" during the Pablo Honey sessions. Yorke introduced the demo to the co-producer Paul Q. Kolderie at the end of the sessions, but decided to save it for their next album. In March 1993, Radiohead recorded another demo with their live sound engineer, Jim Warren, at Courtyard Studios in Oxfordshire, during the same session that produced "High and Dry". After the Pablo Honey tour ended, they sent the demo to the producer John Leckie to work on their upcoming second album, The Bends.

== Recording ==
"The Bends" was one of the songs considered as a potential follow-up single to "Creep" during the album recording. It was initially recorded at London's RAK Studios in sessions held between February and May 1994, before being re-recorded at the Manor Studio in Oxfordshire, where the band spent two weeks working on The Bends in July. According to the drummer, Philip Selway, the song was recorded in a single take: "I wanted to get away from the studio to view a house for rent. Consequently, this was the first take." However, Q reported that the song was recorded over several takes. The unreleased RAK version was mixed by Leckie at London's Abbey Road Studios.

Leckie felt that the guitars were too loud and that the song was "overblown", though the band members disagreed. According to Leckie, the original version of "The Bends" was "more overpowering" than the album version, with Yorke's vocals being more screamed. In an attempt to make the introduction less "bombastic", Radiohead added "tinkling" sound effects that Yorke had recorded on a cassette recorder through a hotel room window while touring in the United States. He said: "There was this guy training these eight-year-old kids, who were parading up and down with all these different instruments. The guy had this little microphone on his sweater and was going: 'Yeah, keep it up, keep it up.' So I ran out and taped it." "The Bends" was mixed by Sean Slade and Kolderie, who had produced Pablo Honey and mixed most of The Bends, with additional mixing by Leckie.

== Composition ==
"The Bends" has been described as an alternative rock, hard rock, Britpop, grunge, and post-grunge song, incorporating elements of arena rock, neo-psychedelia, and experimental rock. It features classic rock guitar riffs, distortion effects and "soaring" vocals, drawing influence from Queen. The Guardian critic Adam Sweeting described the song as "a powerchord masterclass".

The Gazette's Bill Reed likened "The Bends" to the later work of the Beatles, while Arizona Daily Sun's Christopher Burns compared to the Beatles' 1967 song "I Am the Walrus" in both style and lyrics, particularly the opening line: "Where do we go from here?" PopMatters' Colin Fitzgerald noted similarities between the song's "huge major" chords and "melodic vocal hook" with Oasis' songs "Rock 'n' Roll Star" (1994) and "Some Might Say" (1995). (Note: However, "Some Might Say" was released in April 1995, a month after "The Bends" was released.)

Structurally, "The Bends" is one of the most complex songs on the album, containing five distinct sections. This arrangement has been compared to the work of the Pixies, who popularised the "loud-quiet-loud" dynamic and influenced Yorke. The song is played in the key of E minor, in a 4/4 time signature, with a tempo of 90 beats per minute (BPM), while Yorke's vocals span a range of A_{3} to G_{5}. The chord progression follows a sequence of D–C^{add9}–G/B–C^{add9}–G/B–C^{add9}, with a C chord introduced during the pre-verse.

"The Bends" opens with sampled sounds before transitioning to a chord sequence played in unison by the three guitarists: Yorke, Jonny Greenwood and Ed O'Brien. During the second verse, Greenwood briefly plays a counter-melody reminiscent to the Smiths' 1984 song "How Soon Is Now?", incorporating a minor third. O'Brien described Greenwood's guitar playing as "abusive". "The Bends" features a multi-tracked recorder, played by Greenwood appearing low in the mix, as well as trembling effects.

== Lyrics and interpretation ==
["The Bends"] was really just a collection of phrases going round in my head one day. The crazy thing about that song is that there was no calculation or thought involved—it was just whatever sounded good after the previous line. It was written way before we'd ever been to America, even, but yeah, it's always interpreted as this strong reaction against the place and everything that went with it for us.

— Thom Yorke, 1995

The lyrics of "The Bends" explore themes of anxiety, insecurity, loss of identity, social rejection, morbidity, indolence, faithlessness, and stasis. Yorke said "The Bends" was about "knowing who your friends are". The lyrical themes have been compared to those found in "So You Want to Be a Rock 'n' Roll Star" (1967) by the Byrds, "Pump It Up" (1978) by Elvis Costello, and "Serve the Servants" (1993) by Nirvana.

The title refers to decompression sickness, a condition that affects divers who ascend too quickly. Although before "Creep" was released in 1993, some commentators interpreted the title as a reflection on the band's sudden rise to fame following the success of "Creep". While "Creep" brought Radiohead early recognition, it also led some critics to dismiss them as one-hit wonders.

Yorke described "The Bends" as a "Bowie pastiche". He intended the lyrics to be humorous, with lines such as "I want to be part of the human race" and the recurring refrain "I wish it was the Sixties / I wish I could be happy". However, he expressed frustration that this humour was overlooked, as he was repeatedly asked in interviews whether he genuinely wished it was the 1960s.

In 1996, Yorke said "The Bends" was directed at journalists who remained fixated on the 1960s movements, echoing his earlier remarks in a 1995 interview with an Italian magazine, Rock Star, where he stated (translated from Italian): "Even Oasis are nothing more than the result of a laborious and constant reshuffling of everything that has been done from the Sixties to today."

The song references the CIA and the Marines, and features a repeated line: "Where are you now when I need you?" Jazz Monroe of NME regarded the song as "a fame-weary anthem that fired shots at '60s-worshipping Britpop." Scott Wilson of Fact interpreted the 1960s reference as a "sarcastic dig" at contemporary bands obsessed with past eras, drawing comparisons to the lyrics of Oasis' 1994 songs "Live Forever" and "Rock 'n' Roll Star".

== Release and packaging ==
"The Bends" first appeared as a B-side live version, titled "The Benz", on the 1993 French release of "Creep", recorded for the French radio show Black Sessions on 23 February 1993. This version lasts three minutes and 58 seconds. The studio version was later released as the second track on Radiohead's second album, The Bends, on 8 March 1995. It was also included as a B-side on the 1995 French reissue of "Creep" and the 1995 US 7-inch vinyl jukebox release of "Fake Plastic Trees".

More than a year after the release of The Bends, the title track was issued as a single by Parlophone in Ireland on 26 July 1996, the same month that Radiohead began recording their then-upcoming third album, OK Computer (1997). The single was limited to just 2,000 copies and featured live versions of "My Iron Lung" (Note: Some copies of this single play "Planet Telex" instead of "The Bends", while "My Iron Lung" is sometimes cut shorter.) and "Bones", both recorded at the London Forum on 24 March 1995. It reached number 26 on the Irish Singles Chart on 1 August 1996, remaining on the chart for only one week. It was later made available for purchase on Amazon. The accompanying artwork features a graphic of an inhaler, designed by Stanley Donwood and Yorke; Yorke is credited under the pseudonym "The White Chocolate Farm". The same graphic appeared occasionally in other works by Donwood. Written on the back of the CD single:

Assemble all the facts about your anticipated achievement. See yourself in the posture of success. Rule over your troublesome imagination.

"The Bends" was previously released as a CD promotional single in the US by Capitol in 1995, featuring the same live tracks. A Belgian promo edition was issued by EMI Belgium in May 1996, with "Bones" as the second track. The Belgian promo front cover is identical to the artwork of The Bends. "The Bends" was later included on Radiohead's greatest hits album, Radiohead: The Best Of (2008).

The original 4-track demo of "The Bends" was included on the compilation Long Live Tibet (1997), a charity album organised by Tibet House Trust in support of the Tibetan people. The album featured artists including David Bowie and Björk, as well as bands such as Pulp, Blur and Kula Shaker alongside Radiohead. The demo was also included on the compilation MiniDiscs [Hacked] (2019). (Note: Despite being recorded in 1992, the demo is mentioned in the liner notes of the compilation's tenth track, "MD120", as having been part of OK Computer recording sessions in July 1996.) It lasts four minutes and 50 seconds, featuring louder guitars in the opening, a slower tempo than the final studio version, "lifeless" vocals, "slightly" different lyrics, and lo-fi production. Unlike the studio version, Jonny's recorder part is more pronounced in the demo.

== Critical reception ==
Reviewing The Bends in 1995, Patrick Brennan of Hot Press described the title track as "roaring, soaring and tormented". Jeremy Helligar of People wrote that it, along with "Planet Telex", "toss and turn like the best of those big restless Pearl Jam and U2 arena-size anthems." Clare Kleinedler of the Santa Cruz Sentinel noted that the song "reflects the band's reputation for being the gods of freaks and weirdos around the world with York [sic] howling, 'We don't have any real friends'"; Kleinedler appreciated the "seemingly self-pitying line", seeing it as not really self-pity but instead "what defines Radiohead." Kevin McKeough of the Chicago Tribune commented that "The Bends" and "Black Star" "could have been catchy little rockers" if Radiohead had abandoned their "grandiose dramatic effects". The Boston Globe's Jim Sullivan described the song as "full of stops, starts and slides", likening Yorke's vocal style to the English glam tradition of Ian Hunter and David Bowie, while drawing parallels with contemporary bands such as Oasis and Suede. Spence D. of CMJ New Music Monthly praised "The Bends" as "a brilliant piece of raging guitar-driven pop".

=== Legacy ===
In 2007, Anthony Strain of Treble wrote that "The Bends" was "the only song [on the album] that sounds remotely dated; its last moments are the last the record spends squarely in the present." The song was included in the 2007 book The Rough Guide Book of Playlists and Xfm's 2010 book Top 1000 Songs of All Time. In 2012, Mark Lepage of The Gazette likened it to "seeing the sunrise from a new angle." On the 20th anniversary of The Bends in 2015, Kenneth Partridge of Billboard wrote: "For the first 45 seconds, this could be an Oasis track. Then the vocals come in, and Yorke's piss-take on jaded rock-star behavior reveals a searing intelligence and contempt for the world that Noel Gallagher never gets at with his songwriting." Dean Essner of Consequence wrote: "On 'The Bends', Yorke tells us what it's like to swim with the sharks and then shortly after bake on a crowded beach with the rest of civilization, who are just waiting for something to happen, too."

In 2016, Fact ranked "The Bends" the 26th-greatest Radiohead song. In 2017, Pitchfork wrote that it "mopes in the mid-'90s zeitgeist's shadow, mooring Britpop's social theatricality in grunge's grandiose alienation." Radio Hauraki named "The Bends" the 19th-best song of the 1990s. Consequence ranked it as the 50th-best Radiohead song, while Uncut placed it third greatest, behind "Creep" and "Planet Telex". NME ranked Jonny's guitar solo as the seventh greatest, describing it as a "steaming juggernaut of 90s grungey guitar goodness." In 2019, Vulture listed the song as Radiohead's 76th-best, writing: "This wiry, hard-charging song, in hindsight a clear iteration between Pablo Honey and OK Computer, was a solid answer, complete with military-industrial-complex imagery that still seems more playfully absurd than the deadly serious."

== Live performances ==
"The Bends" is one of Radiohead's most frequently performed songs and has been described by New York as a fan favourite. It was the first song they performed from The Bends. The song was featured in their early tours, including performances at Roxane in Tel Aviv, Israel (April 1993), Cabaret Metro in Chicago, Illinois (June 1993), and the Garage in Highbury, London (September 1993). "The Bends" was also included in the setlists for Radiohead's US tour with American band Belly.

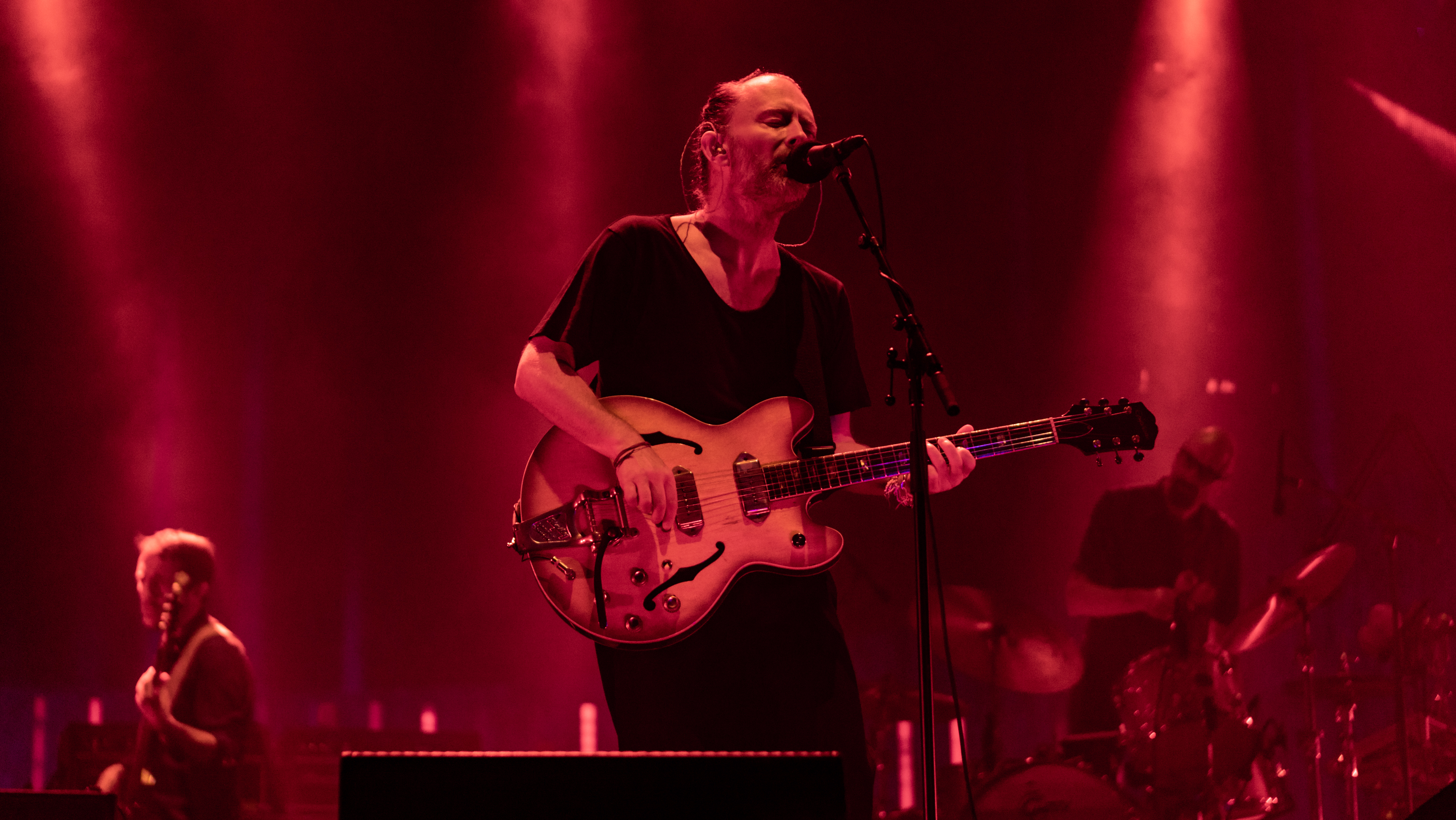
Radiohead performing at the Centre Bell in Montreal in 2018

In May 1994, Radiohead performed "The Bends" at the London Astoria; this performance was later included on Live at the Astoria (1995) and the 2009 "Special Collectors Edition" DVD reissue of The Bends. On 26 June, they performed it during their set at the 1994 Glastonbury Festival. In March 1995, they played it at the London Forum.

Radiohead performed "The Bends" on the TV show Later... with Jools Holland, broadcast on 27 May 1995. This version, lasting three minutes and 53 seconds, was included on the compilation ...Later Volume One: Brit Beat, released in September 1996, alongside tracks by Britpop bands such as Oasis, Suede, Supergrass, and Elastica. It was also featured on the 2009 DVD edition. In 2017, The Telegraph ranked this performance the sixth-greatest in the history of the show. Additionally, in March 1996, they performed it on MTV's 120 Minutes.

"The Bends" remained a staple during the OK Computer tour, including the televised performance at the Glastonbury Festival (June 1997), the Les Eurockéennes de Belfort festival in France (July 1997), and a London Astoria performance (September 1997). Radiohead continued to feature "The Bends" in their setlists during the Kid A (2000), Amnesiac (2001), Hail to the Thief (2003), and In Rainbows (2007) tours.

In January 2010, Radiohead performed a rendition at the Fonda Theatre in Los Angeles, which was included on Radiohead for Haiti (2010). After six years without performing "The Bends", they performed it at some shows on the tour for their ninth album, A Moon Shaped Pool (2016).

== Covers and other usage ==
That was in '97/'98 and Radiohead were a different band. I'm not saying they were extreme metal back then but nowadays they're more experimental. I'm not really into them as much as I used to be. But they did this record called The Bends and it's probably one of the best records that ever came out. We just wanted to do it as a B-side.

— Charlie Benante, 2003

The American heavy metal band Anthrax released a B-side cover of "The Bends" on their 1998 single "Inside Out". Written on the single's notes, drummer Charlie Benante said: "We chose to do this song cause Radiohead are like the Pink Floyd of this era." This version was later included as a bonus track on the 2003 reissue of their eighth album, Volume 8: The Threat Is Real, originally released in 1998. In 2013, Ryan Smith of Whatzup described the cover as "a passable but unremarkable cover and was quickly forgotten."

The American jam band Joe Russo's Almost Dead performed a cover of "The Bends" at the Ritz in Raleigh, North Carolina, on 31 October 2015. They would go on to perform it on additional occasions in 2017 and 2018. In December 2020, the Irish singer Rosie Carney covered the song on her full cover album of The Bends. The English trip hop band Massive Attack sampled "The Bends" in their 2006 track "False Flags".

== Track listings ==
All tracks are written by Radiohead (Thom Yorke, Jonny Greenwood, Ed O'Brien, Colin Greenwood, Philip Selway).

US promo and Irish single (CD)
No.	Title	Venue	Length
1.	"The Bends"		4:03
2.	"My Iron Lung" (live at the Forum)	London Forum, London, England 24 March 1995	4:20
3.	"Bones" (live at the Forum)	London Forum, London, England 24 March 1995	3:02

Irish single (cassette)
No.	Title	Venue	Length
1.	"The Bends"		4:04
2.	"My Iron Lung" (live at the Forum)	London Forum, London, England 24 March 1995	4:40

Belgian promo (CD)
No.	Title	Length
1.	"The Bends"	4:06
2.	"Bones"	3:08

== Personnel ==
Credits adapted from the CD single liner notes, except where noted:

Radiohead

- Thom Yorke
- Jonny Greenwood
- Ed O'Brien
- Colin Greenwood
- Philip Selway

Technical

- John Leckie – production; engineering, additional mixing
- Nigel Godrich – engineering
- Chris Brown – engineering
- Sean Slade – mixing
- Paul Q. Kolderie – mixing

Artwork

- Stanley Donwood – fine art
- Thom Yorke (credited as "The White Chocolate Farm") – fine art
- Binge – design
- The Whole Hog – pasting

== Charts ==
Weekly chart performance for "The Bends"
Chart (1996)	Peak position
Ireland (IRMA)	26

== See also ==
- Decompression sickness

== Notes and references ==
=== Sources ===
- Malins, Steve (1997). Radiohead: Coming Up for Air. Virgin Publishing. ISBN 0-7535-01252.
- Hale, Jonathan (1999). Radiohead: From a Great Height. Canada: ECW Press. ISBN 1-55022-373-9.
- Clarke, Martin (2000). Radiohead: Hysterical and Useless. London, England: Plexus. ISBN 0-85965-266-1.
- Randall, Mac (2000). Exit Music: The Radiohead Story. Omnibus. ISBN 0-7119-7977-4.
- Ogg, Alex (2000). Radiohead: Standing on the Edge. Boxtree. ISBN 0-7522-1843-3.
- Baker, Trevor (2009). Thom Yorke: Radiohead & Trading Solo. London, England: Music Press Books. ISBN 978-1-78418-949-5.
- Mueller, Andrew (2010). Rock and Hard Places: Travels to Backstages, Frontlines and Assorted Sideshows. US: Soft Skull Press. ISBN 978-1-59376-268-1.
- Ehmann, Julia (2020). Radiohead and the Journey Beyond Genre: Analysing Stylistic Debates and Transgressions. Routledge. ISBN 978-1-138-33474-8.
- Caffrey, Dan (2021). Radiohead FAQ: All That's Left to Know About the World's Most Famous Cult Band. Rowman & Littlefield. ISBN 978-1-4930-5397-1.
