= Paranoid Android =

1997 single by Radiohead

Single by Radiohead

from the album OK Computer
- B-side: "Polyethylene (Parts 1 & 2)"; "Pearly*"; "A Reminder"; "Melatonin"
- Released: 26 May 1997
- Genre: Alternative rock; art rock; progressive rock; neo-prog
- Length: 6:27
- Label: Parlophone; Capitol
- Songwriter: Radiohead
- Producers: Nigel Godrich; Radiohead

Radiohead singles chronology
"The Bends" (1996)	"Paranoid Android" (1997)	"Karma Police" (1997)

Music video
- "Paranoid Android" on YouTube

"Paranoid Android" is a song by English alternative rock band Radiohead, released as the lead single from their third studio album, OK Computer (1997), on 26 May 1997. The lyrics were written by singer Thom Yorke following an unpleasant experience in a Los Angeles bar. The song is over six minutes long and contains four sections. The title is taken from Marvin the Paranoid Android from the science fiction series The Hitchhiker's Guide to the Galaxy.

"Paranoid Android" charted at number three on the UK Singles Chart, Radiohead's highest-charting position in the UK to date. It received acclaim, with critics claiming it to be the band's magnum opus, comparing it to the songs "Happiness Is a Warm Gun" by the Beatles and "Bohemian Rhapsody" by Queen. It has appeared regularly on lists of the best songs of all time, including NME's and Rolling Stone's respective 500 Greatest Songs of All Time lists. Its animated music video, directed by Magnus Carlsson, was placed on heavy rotation on MTV, although the network censored portions containing nudity in the US. At the 1998 Brit Awards, the song was nominated for Best British Single. The track has been covered by artists in a variety of genres. It was included in the 2008 Radiohead: The Best Of.

== Writing and recording ==
As with many other OK Computer tracks, "Paranoid Android" was recorded in St Catherine's Court, a 15th-century mansion near the village of St Catherine, near Bath, Somerset. It was produced by Nigel Godrich.

Inspired by the through-composed structure of the Beatles' 1968 song "Happiness Is a Warm Gun", Radiohead fused parts from three different songs. Other inspirations included Queen's "Bohemian Rhapsody" and the work of the Pixies.

The first version was over 14 minutes long and included a long Hammond organ outro performed by Jonny Greenwood. The guitarist Ed O'Brien said: "We'd be pissing ourselves while we played. We'd bring out the glockenspiel and it would be really, really funny." The singer, Thom Yorke, sarcastically referred to this version as "a Pink Floyd cover". Greenwood said later that the organ solo was "hard to listen to without clutching the sofa for support". Godrich said: "Nothing really happened with the outro. It just spun and spun and it got very Deep Purple and went off." An early extended version was included on the 2019 compilation MiniDiscs [Hacked].

Influenced by the editing of the Beatles' Magical Mystery Tour, Radiohead shortened the song to six and a half minutes, replacing the organ solo with a shorter guitar solo. The bassist, Colin Greenwood, said the band "felt like irresponsible schoolboys ... Nobody does a six-and-a-half-minute song with all these changes. It's ridiculous." For the ending, Yorke recorded himself shouting gibberish into a Dictaphone. Godrich edited the parts together with tape. He said: "It's a very hard thing to explain, but it's all on 24-track and it runs through ... I was very pleased with myself. I sort of stood there and said, 'You guys have no idea what I've just done.' It was pretty clever."

The title is taken from Marvin the Paranoid Android from the science fiction series The Hitchhiker's Guide to the Galaxy. Yorke said the title was a joke: "It was like, 'Oh, I'm so depressed.' And I just thought, that's great. That's how people would like me to be ... The rest of the song is not personal at all."

== Composition ==
"Paranoid Android"
Audio sample from the middle of the second section to the beginning of the first guitar solo

"Paranoid Android" is described as alternative rock, art rock, progressive rock and neo-prog. It has four distinct sections, potentially defining the track as a "rhapsody", each played in standard tuning, and a 4/4 time signature, although several three-bar segments in the second section are played in 7/8 timing.

The opening is played in the key of G minor with a tempo of 82 beats per minute (BPM), and begins with a mid-tempo acoustic guitar backed by shaken percussion before layered with electric guitar and Yorke's vocals. The melody of the opening vocal lines spans an octave and a third.

The second section is in the key of A minor and begins about two minutes into the song. Although the second section retains the tempo of the first, it differs rhythmically. Ending the second section is a distorted guitar solo by Jonny Greenwood, which lasts from 2:43 to 3:33.

The third section was written by Jonny Greenwood, and reduces the tempo to 62 BPM. The harmonies form a looped chord progression resembling a Baroque passacaglia, with the tonality split between C minor and D minor. This section uses multi-tracked, choral vocal arrangement and according to Dai Griffiths, a "chord sequence [that ordinarily] would sound seedy, rather like something by the band Portishead".

The fourth and final section, which begins at 5:35, is a brief instrumental reprise of the second section that serves as a coda. After a second solo, a brief guitar riff is introduced, which Jonny Greenwood says "was something I had floating around for a while and the song needed a certain burn. It happened to be the right key and the right speed and it fit right in." Jonny Greenwood's solo tone during the solo is achieved by passing the guitar through a Mutronics Mutator rack unit. The song ends, as does the second section, with a short chromatically descending guitar motif.

The style of the song was likened to Queen by Rolling Stone's Mark Kemp, while other critics, including David Browne of Entertainment Weekly, Jon Lusk of the BBC and Simon Williams of NME wrote about its similarity to Queen's "Bohemian Rhapsody".

=== Lyrics ===
"Paranoid Android" is categorised by three distinct moods written in what Yorke referred to as three different states of mind. The lyrics tie in with a number of themes common in OK Computer, including insanity, violence, slogans, and political objection to capitalism. Yorke's lyrics were based on an unpleasant experience at a Los Angeles bar during which he was surrounded by strangers who were high on cocaine. Yorke was frightened by a woman who became violent after someone spilled a drink on her. He characterised the woman as "inhuman", and said "There was a look in this woman's eyes that I'd never seen before anywhere. ... Couldn't sleep that night because of it." The woman inspired the line "kicking squealing Gucci little piggy" in the song's second section. Yorke, referring to the line "With your opinion, which is of no consequence at all", said that "Again, that's just a joke. It's actually the other way around – it's actually my opinion that is of no consequence at all."

== Music video ==
Yorke said that many people suggested Radiohead make another "moody and black and dark" music video for "Paranoid Android", similar to the video for their single "Street Spirit". However, Radiohead wanted an entertaining and "sick" video instead. Yorke said: "We had really good fun doing this song, so the video should make you laugh."

Radiohead commissioned the Swedish animator Magnus Carlsson to make the video. Radiohead were fans of his animated series Robin. Jonny Greenwood described Robin as "affectionate" and "vulnerable", while Yorke said he found Robin "quite the vulnerable character, but he's also violently cynical and quite tough and would always get up again". At first, Carlsson sought to work on a video for "No Surprises" and was uncertain as to how to approach "Paranoid Android". To conceive the video, he locked himself in his office for over 12 hours to stare out of the window, listen to the song on repeat and jot down visual ideas. According to Yorke, the band did not send Magnus the lyrics as they did not want the video to be too literal. The concept for the video was based entirely on the song's sound.

=== Summary ===
The video's protagonist, Robin.

Like Robin, the "Paranoid Android" video is drawn in a simplistic style that emphasises bold colours and clear, strong lines. It features Robin and his friend Benjamin venturing into the world, running into miserable EU representatives, bullying pub patrons, a prostitute, kissing leathermen, a drug addict, deranged businessmen, mermaids, and an angel who plays table tennis with Robin.

The band appears in cameo at a bar, where they drink while watching a man with a head coming out of his belly dancing on their table. However, in this cameo only the versions of Yorke and Jonny Greenwood resemble themselves; O'Brien said "If you freeze-frame it on the video, the guy with the five strands of hair slicked back, that's Colin. It looks nothing like him." Colin Greenwood said "there was no way that we could appear in it to perform in it because that would be so Spinal Tap" and that having animations that did not resemble the band members allowed the video to be "twisted and colourful which is how the song is anyway".

=== Reception ===
Yorke was pleased with the video, saying that it "is really about the violence around [Robin], which is exactly like the song. Not the same specific violence as in the lyrics, but everything going on around him is deeply troubling and violent, but he's just drinking himself into oblivion. He's there, but he's not there. That's why it works. And that's why it does my head in every time I see it."

While the single did not receive significant radio play in the US, MTV placed its video on high rotation. The version most often shown was edited to remove the mermaids' bare breasts. Colin Greenwood said, "We would've understood if they had a problem with some guy chopping his arms and legs off, but I mean, a woman's breasts! And mermaids as well! It's fucked up." MTV Europe played the video uncut for two weeks because the channel's official censor was ill and unable to work. After that time the channel ran the cut version of the video. A later US version of the video has the mermaids wearing bathing suits.

Evan Sawdey of PopMatters described the video as "bizarre yet fitting", and Melody Maker said it represented a stunning "psycho-cartoon". Adrian Glover of Circus called the animation incredible and the video "really cool". The MTV vice president of music Lewis Largent told Spin: "You can watch 'Paranoid Android' a hundred times and not figure it all out."

== Artwork ==
The back of the CD2 release of "Paranoid Android" illustrates the release's use of images from the OK Computer artwork, the change in tint from the CD1 release, and the "cathedral of white" message.

Stanley Donwood worked with Yorke to design the artwork for most of the "Paranoid Android" releases, although both the images and design were ultimately credited to "dumb computers". The cover illustration accompanying the single depicts a hand-drawn dome that contains the phrase "God loves his children, yeah!", the last line of the song, written above on the uppermost plane. Images from the OK Computer artwork reappear, including a pig and two human figures shaking hands. Writer Tim Footman suggested that these images are borrowed from Pink Floyd, respectively corresponding to the Animals and Wish You Were Here cover.

The two versions of the single have different messages on the reverse. Both the CD1 and Japanese releases state:

To kill a demon made of wet sawdust. This sort of demon is almost impossible to kill the only way to do it is to cover its face with wet bread and karate chop its head off otherwise you are in trouble and so is the neighbourhood. Wet sawdust demons like to terrorise. N.B. pressing its face into wet bread that is on the ground works best though you can get a result just by throwing the bread at its face.

Written on the back of the CD2 single is:

A cathedral of white in a suburban shanty town two up two down houses with just the asbestos and the skeletons left.

== Release ==
Each time I'd hear it, I'd keep thinking about people doing intricate jobs in factories – working on industrial lathes – getting injured from the shock of being exposed to it.

— Thom Yorke, on potential responses to "Paranoid Android" being played on BBC Radio 1

While Colin Greenwood said the song was "hardly the radio-friendly, breakthrough, buzz bin unit shifter [radio stations] have been expecting", Capitol supported Radiohead's choice for "Paranoid Android" as the lead single from OK Computer. Radiohead chose it to prepare listeners for the musical direction of the album.

"Paranoid Android" was premiered on the BBC Radio 1 programme The Evening Session in April 1997, nearly a month before its release as a single. It was released as a single by the band to prepare listeners for the musical direction of its parent album. Despite an initial lack of radio play, "Paranoid Android" charted at number three on the UK Singles Chart, giving Radiohead their highest singles chart position. As the song's popularity grew, Radio 1 played it up to 12 times a day. Yorke described its appearance on Radio 1 as one of his proudest moments of the OK Computer era. It also spent two weeks on Australia's ARIA Singles Chart, where it reached number 29.

Each release of "Paranoid Android" included one or more B-sides. "Polyethylene (Parts 1 & 2)", included on the CD1, 7-inch vinyl, and Japanese releases of the single, were a multi-section piece formatted much like "Paranoid Android" itself. The first part of the song consists of Yorke's vocals over acoustic guitar; the second part contains distorted guitar and organ and uses complex time signature changes. "Pearly*", featured on the CD1 and Japanese releases of the single, was described by Yorke as a "dirty song for people who use sex for dirty things". "A Reminder", which appears on the CD2 release, features fuzzed guitar, thumping drums, and electric piano. According to Yorke, this song was inspired by "this idea of someone writing a song, sending it to someone, and saying: 'If I ever lose it, you just pick up the phone and play this song back to remind me.'" "Melatonin", also on the CD2 release, is a synthesiser-based song with lyrics similar to that of a lullaby, but with an undercurrent of menace in lines like "Death to all who stand in your way". The OK Computer track "Let Down" is also included on the Japanese single.

The 2006 anime Ergo Proxy uses "Paranoid Android" as the main theme. The song is featured in the credits. When Radiohead were asked about it being featured as the theme, they originally declined, but after being shown a preview of the anime they obliged and allowed it to be used.

== Reception ==
"Paranoid Android" received acclaim. NME chose it as its "Single of the Week", with journalist Simon Williams describing how the song "sprawls out like a plump man on a small sofa, featuring all manner of crypto-flamenco shufflings, medieval wailings, furiously wrenched guitars and ravishingly over-ambitious ideas. Possesses one of the most unorthodox 'axe' solos known to mankind.", and said the song felt "not unlike 'Bohemian Rhapsody' being played backwards by a bunch of Vietnam vets high on Kings Cross-quality crack".

Kemp praised the mix of acoustic and electronic instrumentation to produce "complex tempo changes, touches of dissonance, ancient choral music and a King Crimson-like melodic structure". Browne wrote of "celestial call-and-response vocal passages, dynamically varied sections, and Thom Yorke's high-voiced bleat". The A.V. Club called the song unforgettable and an "amazing epic single".

Several reviewers noted the song's ambition. Slant Magazine described the song's lyrics as a "multipart anti-yuppie anthem whose ambition is anything but ugly", and Andy Gill wrote in The Independent that "Paranoid Android" could be the most ambitious single since Jimmy Webb's "MacArthur Park". Craig McLean of The Sydney Morning Herald described "Paranoid Android" as "a titanic guitar opera in three movements and 6½ minutes". PopMatters' Evan Sawdey called the song OK Computer's "sweeping, multi-tiered centerpiece", Peter and Jonathan Buckley wrote in The Rough Guide to Rock that it was the album's "breathtaking high point". AllMusic's Stephen Thomas Erlewine called "Paranoid Android" "complex, multi-segmented ... tight, melodic, and muscular", and said it displayed Radiohead at their most adventurous. Browne admitted that, partially because of "Paranoid Android", OK Computer was significantly more expansive than The Bends. Rolling Stone placed the song at number 256 on its list of "The 500 Greatest Songs of All Time", and Pitchfork included the song at number 4 on their Top 200 Tracks of the 90s. In 2019, American Songwriter ranked the song number three on their list of the 20 greatest Radiohead songs, and in 2020, The Guardian ranked the song number one on their list of the 40 greatest Radiohead songs.

== Track listings ==
All songs were written by Thom Yorke, Jonny Greenwood, Ed O'Brien, Colin Greenwood, and Philip Selway.

UK CD1 (CDODATAS 01)

1. "Paranoid Android" – 6:27
2. "Polyethylene (Parts 1 & 2)" – 4:23
3. "Pearly*" – 3:34

UK CD2 (CDNODATA 01)

1. "Paranoid Android" – 6:27
2. "A Reminder" – 3:52
3. "Melatonin" – 2:08

UK 7-inch single (NODATA 01)

1. "Paranoid Android"
2. "Polyethylene (Parts 1 & 2)"

Japanese CD single (TOCP-40038)

1. "Paranoid Android" – 6:26
2. "Polyethylene (Parts 1 & 2)" – 4:22
3. "Pearly*" – 3:33
4. "Let Down" – 4:59

== Charts ==
=== Weekly charts ===
Weekly chart performance for "Paranoid Android"
Chart (1997)	Peak position
Australia (ARIA)	29
Belgium (Ultratip Bubbling Under Flanders)	15
Europe (Eurochart Hot 100)	9
Iceland (Íslenski Listinn Topp 40)	4
Ireland (IRMA)	4
Israel (IBA)	30
Netherlands (Dutch Top 40 Tipparade)	5
Netherlands (Single Top 100)	61
Scottish Singles Sales (Official Charts)	2
Sweden (Sverigetopplistan)	53
UK Singles (Official Charts)	3

=== Year-end charts ===
Year-end chart performance for "Paranoid Android"
Chart (1997)	Position
Iceland (Íslenski Listinn Topp 40)	23
UK Singles (OCC)	80

Chart (2001)	Position
Canada (Nielsen SoundScan)	193

== Certifications ==
Certifications and sales for "Paranoid Android"
Region	Certification	Certified units/sales
Canada (Music Canada)	Gold	40,000^{‡}
New Zealand (RMNZ)	Gold	15,000^{‡}
United Kingdom (BPI)	Gold	400,000^{‡}
^{‡} Sales+streaming figures based on certification alone.

== Cover versions ==
- Jazz pianist Brad Mehldau recorded a nine-minute cover of "Paranoid Android" on his album Largo (2002), featuring percussionists Jim Keltner and Matt Chamberlain, as well as a horn section. Additionally, Mehldau performed a 19-minute version of the song on Live in Tokyo (2004).
- The University of Massachusetts Amherst's Minuteman Marching Band covered the song live in a version featuring xylophones, chimes, snare drums, cymbals, bass drum and timpani.
- Numerous Radiohead tribute albums include a version of "Paranoid Android", including Rockabye Baby! Lullaby Renditions of Radiohead and Plastic Mutations: The Electronic Tribute to Radiohead.
- The reggae group Easy Star All-Stars covered OK Computer in its entirety for Radiodread (2006). Producer Michael G noted that "Paranoid Android" was particularly difficult to arrange for reggae, saying "There are songs like 'Paranoid Android', which flips between 4/4 time and 7/8 time about 13 times, and I also had to think about other ways to reinterpret those parts with horns, melodica, organ ... it was a great challenge."
- Sia covered the song for the neo soul tribute Exit Music: Songs with Radio Heads (2006), and this version later appeared on The O.C. episode "The Chrismukk-huh?".
- Los Angeles string quartet the Section recorded the song for Strung Out on OK Computer: The String Quartet Tribute to Radiohead (2001); half of this quartet went on to form the Section Quartet, who performed "Paranoid Android" and the rest of OK Computer during two concerts in October 2006.
- Weezer covered "Paranoid Android" in both a live studio version released as a YouTube video and in concerts during their 2011 summer tour. Pitchfork's Tom Breihan called the Weezer cover "a fucking weird experience", and Jenny Eliscu of Rolling Stone criticised the song as "mainly boring" for not venturing far enough from Weezer's traditional sound.
- The Montreal duo Stick&Bow recorded a 6:14 cover of "Paranoid Android" on their 2019 album Resonance, arranged for the cello and marimba.
- On 23 October 2020, Australian indie rock band Ball Park Music performed a cover of the song live for Triple J's Like a Version segment, alongside a performance of their track "Cherub". Music Feeds thought the cover "play[ed] it fairly safe", additionally stating the cover had been "execute[d] with such finesse", whilst Junkee felt it was "performed with energy and enthusiasm, by a bunch of committed and attentive musicians".
