= Exit Music: Songs with Radio Heads =

2006 Radiohead tribute album by various artists

Compilation album by Various Artists
- Released: 18 April 2006
- Genre: Various
- Label: Rapster/Barely Breaking Even

Singles from Exit Music: Songs with Radio Heads
- 1. "Just" Released: 13 March 2006

Exit Music: Songs with Radio Heads is a tribute album to British band Radiohead released in 2006 on Rapster Records and Barely Breaking Even Records. The album features reworked songs from Mark Ronson, Alex Greenwald of Phantom Planet, Sia, Matthew Herbert, Sa-Ra, The Cinematic Orchestra, RJD2 and many others.

== Track listing ==
1. "No Surprises" – Shawn Lee
2. "Morning Bell" – The Randy Watson Experience featuring Donn
3. "In Limbo" – Sa-Ra featuring Sa-Ra All Stars
4. "High and Dry" – Pete Kuzma featuring Bilal (Note: According to Status magazine, a cover of this song was recorded by Bilal for his unreleased second album Love for Sale.)
5. "Just" – Mark Ronson featuring Alex Greenwald
6. "Airbag" – RJD2
7. "(Nice Dream)" – Matthew Herbert featuring Mara Carlyle
8. "Blow Out" – LO Freq
9. "The National Anthem" – Me'Shell Ndegéocello & Chris Dave
10. "Karma Police" – The Bad Plus
11. "Paranoid Android" – Sia
12. "Everything in Its Right Place" – Osunlade featuring Erro
13. "Knives Out" – Waajeed of Platinum Pied Pipers featuring Monica Blaire
14. "Exit Music (For a Film)" – The Cinematic Orchestra

== Reception ==
Exit Music: Songs with Radio Heads received 0.6 out of 10 from Pitchfork and one out of five from the Guardian.

== See also ==
- Radiodread
