= City of Lewes =

City of Lewes may refer to:

- Lewes, Delaware, a city in Sussex County, Delaware, in the United States
- USS City of Lewes (SP-383), later renamed USS Lewes (SP-383), a United States Navy minesweeper and patrol vessel in commission from 1917 to 1919
