= Lewes (disambiguation) =

Lewes is the county town of East Sussex in the United Kingdom.

Lewes may also refer to:

== Places ==
- Lewes (district), a local government district in East Sussex in the United Kingdom
- Lewes (UK Parliament constituency), a Parliamentary constituency in East Sussex
- Lewes, Delaware, a city in Sussex County, Delaware, US
- Lewes, Prince Edward Island, see Lot 60, Prince Edward Island
- Lewes River, previous name of the upper portion of the Yukon River which runs through Yukon, Canada, and Alaska, US

== People ==
- Lewes Lewknor, Elizabethan courtier and writer
- Lewes (surname), the name of various people

== Other uses ==
- USS City of Lewes (SP-383), later renamed USS Lewes (SP-383), a US Navy minesweeper and patrol vessel
- Lewes bomb, a British blast-incendiary field expedient explosive device of World War II

== See also ==
- Louis (disambiguation)
- Lewis (disambiguation)
