= Lewes (surname) =

Surname

Lewes is a surname, and may refer to:

- Charles Lee Lewes (1740–1803), British actor
- George Henry Lewes (1817–1878), British philosopher and literary critic
- Jock Lewes (1913–1941), Australian soldier

== See also ==
- Lewes
- Lewes (disambiguation)
