= Kid A Mnesia Exhibition =

2021 video game

- Developers: Namethemachine; Arbitrarily Good Productions
- Publisher: Epic Games
- Producers: Matthew Davis; Namethemachine; Arbitrarily Good Productions
- Programmers: Namethemachine; Arbitrarily Good Productions
- Artists: Stanley Donwood; Thom Yorke
- Composers: Radiohead; Nigel Godrich
- Engine: Unreal Engine 4
- Platforms: macOS; Windows; PlayStation 5
- Release: 18 November 2021
- Genre: Walking sim
- Mode: Single-player

Kid A Mnesia Exhibition is a 2021 walking simulator published by Epic Games for macOS, Windows and PlayStation 5. It serves as a digital exhibition of music and artwork created for the Radiohead albums Kid A (2000) and Amnesiac (2001). It was developed by Namethemachine, Arbitrarily Good Productions and Epic Games in collaboration with the Radiohead singer Thom Yorke, Radiohead's producer Nigel Godrich and the Radiohead cover artist Stanley Donwood.

Kid A Mnesia Exhibition was conceived as a physical installation artwork, but this was canceled by logistical problems and the COVID-19 pandemic. It was announced alongside the compilation album Kid A Mnesia and released 18 November 2021 as a free download. It received positive reviews, with critics praising its intersection of music, art and technology. A physical installation, Motion Picture House: Kid A Mnesia, opened at the 2026 Coachella festival in California and is set to tour the US.

== Content ==
Kid A Mnesia Exhibition is a walking simulator based on the music and artwork of the Radiohead albums Kid A (2000) and Amnesiac (2001). Players move through an abstract virtual museum, examining artwork and listening to music and sounds from the albums. They cannot die, and there are no enemies, no score system, and no levels to complete.

The New Yorker described the museum as "a brutalist cathedral full of byzantine corridors, majestic rooms, banks of buzzing cathode-ray-tube televisions, and carpets of fluttering sketchbook pages". The large central pyramid features the songs "How to Disappear Completely", "Pyramid Song" and "You and Whose Army?". The Paper Chamber features dozens of pages taken from sketchbooks and lyric sheets, and the Televisions room has stacks of televisions playing short videos.

== Background ==
Kid A Mnesia Exhibition was conceived as a physical installation artwork to be constructed from shipping containers and exhibited in cities around the world. The Radiohead singer, Thom Yorke, and the artist Stanley Donwood, who together create the artwork for Radiohead albums, imagined a "huge red construction" that would look "as if a brutalist spacecraft had crash-landed into the classical architecture ... This astounding steel carapace would be inserted into the urban fabric of London like an ice pick into Trotsky."

The construction was first planned for the Victoria and Albert Museum in London, but would not fit. The plan moved to the Royal Albert Hall, but was rejected by Westminster City Council. The plan for a physical installation was ultimately cancelled by the COVID-19 pandemic, and the focus shifted towards creating a digital exhibition. In the words of Yorke and Donwood, this meant the exhibition "didn't have to conform to any normal rules of an exhibition. Or reality."

== Development ==
Kid A Mnesia Exhibition was developed over two years by Namethemachine and Arbitrarily Good Productions with Yorke, Donwood and Radiohead's producer, Nigel Godrich. The staff included the artist and creative director Sean Evans, the theatre set designer Christine Jones and the producer Matthew Davis, the head of Namethemachine. The environment and characters were developed using tools such as Maya, and the levels were created with Unreal Engine.

The team had the guiding principle of exhibiting no new work. According to a blog post by Yorke and Donwood, everything in the exhibition came from material made while Radiohead were recording Kid A and Amnesiac. Characters in the museum were based on the themes and characters in Radiohead's music and artwork, including the stickmen, bears and minotaurs. The team followed a brief of "exploded songs", taking the separated stems and "laying them out". Godrich contributed sound design and remixed the music in surround sound, so players hear different elements as they move around in 3D space.

Evans said the museum was influenced by labyrinths and the fictional Library of Babel, "a place that instilled a feeling of being lost without feeling hopeless". It was designed for players to take multiple routes, with no dead ends, and strong colour schemes and lighting to help the player become familiar with different spaces. The initial spaces were designed to feel physically possible; once the player enters the central pyramid, the spaces feel "more void-like, more impossible", with a shifting number of walls and surfaces. The Rotunda was based on the Rundetaarn in Copenhagen, and the Landscape Gallery was based on a room in the Musée de l'Orangerie in Paris.

== Release ==
Kid A Mnesia Exhibition was announced on 9 September 2021. It was released as a free download for macOS, Windows, and PlayStation 5 on 18 November 2021. Promotional Radiohead items were released for the multiplayer games Rocket League, Fall Guys and Fortnite.

Jay Peters of The Verge wrote that Kid A Mnesia Exhibition was "full of strikingly beautiful rooms" and "worth checking out as a very literal expression of the idea that video games can be art". NME wrote that it was a "deeply beautiful solo trip through what appears to be an apocalyptic wasteland, before little pockets of beauty show themselves in unexpected places, poking out of the darkness". The New Yorker named Kid A Mnesia Exhibition one of the best games of the year, writing that it "provokes exploration, reflection, and a new way of listening".

== Physical installation ==
On 10 April 2026, a physical installation, Motion Picture House: Kid A Mnesia, opened in a custom-built bunker at the 2026 Coachella festival in California. It comprises artwork and animations by Yorke and Donwood set to music from the albums. Godrich created new mixes in spatial audio. The exhibition is scheduled to transfer to Brooklyn, Chicago, Mexico City and San Francisco and close in February 2027. Billboard wrote that the Kid A and Amnesiac artwork had aged well, and that the timing of the exhibition felt deliberate following the pandemic, new wars and threats posed by artificial intelligence.
