= Judge Lewis =

Judge Lewis may refer to:

- David Thomas Lewis (1912–1983), judge of the United States Court of Appeals for the Tenth Circuit
- Mary Geiger Lewis (born 1958), judge of the United States District Court for the District of South Carolina
- Oren Ritter Lewis (1902–1983), judge of the United States District Court for the Eastern District of Virginia
- Robert E. Lewis (1857–1941), judge of the United States Courts of Appeals for the Eighth and Tenth Circuits
- Timothy K. Lewis (born 1954), judge of the United States Court of Appeals for the Third Circuit
- William Lewis (judge) (1752–1819), judge of the United States District Court for the District of Pennsylvania
- Wilma A. Lewis (born 1956), judge of the United States District Court of the Virgin Islands

== See also ==
- Justice Lewis (disambiguation)
