= Lewis Bridge =

Lewis Bridge may refer to:

- Lewis Bridge (Missouri River), in Missouri, United States
- Lewis Bridge (Keya Paha River), Springview, Nebraska and Wewela, South Dakota, United States

== See also ==
- Lewis Bandt Bridge
- Lewis River (disambiguation)
- Lewis (disambiguation)
