= Lewis River =

Lewis River may refer to:

- Lewis River (Alaska)
- Lewis River (Canterbury), New Zealand
- Lewis River (West Coast), New Zealand
- Lewis River (Washington)
- Lewis River (Wyoming)
- the former name of the Snake River in the United States

== See also ==
- Lewis Bridge (disambiguation)
- Lewis (disambiguation)
