= Dead Children Playing =

Book by Stanley Donwood and Thom Yorke

- Cover of second edition, 2007.
- Author: Stanley Donwood; Thom Yorke
- Illustrator: Stanley Donwood; Thom Yorke
- Cover artist: Stanley Donwood
- Language: English
- Publisher: Naked Guides Ltd (2007); Verso Press United States (2007)
- Publication date: 28 February 2007; 30 October 2007
- Publication place: United Kingdom
- Media type: Print (Hardback)
- Pages: 80 pages
- ISBN: 978-1-84467-170-0
- OCLC: 171111203
- Dewey Decimal: 741.660922 22
- LC Class: N6768 .D667 2007

Dead Children Playing is a picture book by Stanley Donwood and Thom Yorke featuring artwork from albums by Yorke and the English rock band Radiohead.

== Editions ==
The first edition of Dead Children Playing was released in 2006, to accompany Donwood and Yorke's art exhibition at the Iguapop Gallery in Barcelona, Spain, from November 23 to December 16. Donwood took the name from a sign he had seen in a park. The second edition was released on 1 October 2007 by Verso Publishing.

== Reception ==
Reviewing the book in The Art Book, Rosalind McKever wrote "this picture book is an excellent advert for some of the most prevalent art of our time; this truly is pop-art, digesting visual, social and political culture and reconstituting it in an accessible and affordable form".

Ben Johnson for Naples Daily News wrote: "It's spooky stuff, no question, but good art is meant to inspire a reaction, and there's no question this picture book will do that for most of its readers."
