= Lewis Township =

Lewis Township may refer to:

- Lewis Township, Scott County, Arkansas, in Scott County, Arkansas
- Lewis Township, Clay County, Indiana
- Lewis Township, Pottawattamie County, Iowa
- Lewis Township, Gove County, Kansas
- Lewis Township, Holt County, Missouri
- Lewis Township, New Madrid County, Missouri
- Lewis Township, Minnesota
- Lewis Township, Clay County, Nebraska
- Lewis Township, Bottineau County, North Dakota
- Lewis Township, Brown County, Ohio
- Lewis Township, Lycoming County, Pennsylvania
- Lewis Township, Northumberland County, Pennsylvania
- Lewis Township, Union County, Pennsylvania
