= Lewis Township, New Madrid County, Missouri =

Inactive township in the US state of Missouri

Coordinates: 36.5942°N 89.6558°W

Lewis Township is an inactive township in New Madrid County, in the U.S. state of Missouri.

Lewis Township was established in 1906, taking its name from Lilbourn Lewis, an early settler.
