= Fake Plastic Trees =

1995 single by Radiohead

Single by Radiohead

from the album The Bends
- B-side: "India Rubber"; "How Can You Be Sure?"
- Released: 15 May 1995
- Recorded: 1994
- Studio: RAK, London
- Genre: Alternative rock; pop rock
- Length: 4:52
- Label: Parlophone
- Songwriter: Radiohead
- Producer: John Leckie

Radiohead singles chronology
"High and Dry" / "Planet Telex" (1995)	"Fake Plastic Trees" (1995)	"Just" (1995)

Music video
- "Fake Plastic Trees" on YouTube

"Fake Plastic Trees" is a song by the English rock band Radiohead, released in May 1995 by Parlophone from their second album, The Bends (1995). It was the third single from The Bends in the UK and the first in the US.

Radiohead recorded "Fake Plastic Trees" at RAK Studios, London, with the producer John Leckie. They struggled to settle on an arrangement, dismissing one version as "pompous and bombastic". The final version was influenced by the American singer-songwriter Jeff Buckley.

"Fake Plastic Trees" reached the top 50 on the UK singles chart, the New Zealand Singles Chart, the US Modern Rock Tracks chart and the Canadian Rock/Alternative chart. In 2003, Rolling Stone included it at number 385 on its list of the "500 Greatest Songs of All Time". Pitchfork credited "Fake Plastic Trees" as an influence on post-Britpop acts such as Coldplay and Travis.

== Writing ==
Thom Yorke, Radiohead's songwriter, said "Fake Plastic Trees" was "the product of a joke that wasn't really a joke, a very lonely, drunken evening and, well, a breakdown of sorts". He said it arose from a melody he had "no idea what to do with". According to Yorke, he did not force the lyrics, and instead "just recorded whatever was going on in my head ... I wrote those words and laughed. I thought they were really funny, especially that bit about polystyrene."

== Recording ==
Radiohead recorded "Fake Plastic Trees" for their second album, The Bends, in 1994 at RAK Studios, London, with the producer John Leckie. The sessions were strained by pressure from Radiohead's record label, EMI, to record a single to match the success of their debut, "Creep". The guitarist Ed O'Brien likened one version to the Guns N' Roses song "November Rain", saying it was "pompous and bombastic ... just the worst".

One evening, Radiohead attended a concert by the American singer-songwriter Jeff Buckley at the Garage, London. Buckley gave Yorke the confidence to sing in falsetto, and Leckie said: "It made [Thom] realise you could sing in a falsetto without sounding dripping." Inspired by Buckley, Yorke recorded a performance of "Fake Plastic Trees" alone on acoustic guitar. According to the bassist, Colin Greenwood, Yorke played three takes, then burst into tears. Yorke initially did not want to use the takes, saying they were too vulnerable, but was persuaded by his bandmates.

Radiohead spent several days overdubbing parts onto Yorke's performance, including a Hammond organ played by Jonny Greenwood. The drummer, Philip Selway, described following Yorke's fluctuating tempo: "Part of the beauty was the way it would actually slip in and out, but trying to follow it was a nightmare." The string arrangement was written by Jonny Greenwood and inspired by the American composer Samuel Barber. The strings were performed by a viola player and a cello player, who multitracked their parts. Radiohead spent several months removing elements, including most of the strings, to create the final song. A mixing error by Paul Kolderie meant the distorted guitars entered later than intended, but Radiohead liked the effect and retained it.

== Release ==
According to Radiohead's co-manager Chris Hufford, American audiences were disappointed by the lack of a "Creep"-style song on The Bends. In response, Capitol, the US subsidiary of EMI, chose "Fake Plastic Trees" as the first US single, to further distance Radiohead from "Creep".

Radiohead resisted pressure from Capitol to remix "Fake Plastic Trees" for the American market. Yorke said at the time: "If it doesn't get on the radio the way it is now, then I don't think it's going to get on the radio at all ... People say it won't work on the radio, but I have no fucking idea what they mean." It received airplay on US alternative radio stations but did not enter the US Billboard Hot 100. It reached number 20 on the UK singles chart. An acoustic version was used in the 1995 film Clueless and introduced Radiohead to a larger American audience.

The music video was directed by Jake Scott. It depicts Yorke sitting in a supermarket trolley, which the journalist Mac Randall said reflects his "bitter sense that he and his music were just another commodity to be bought and sold".

== Reception ==
Reviewing The Bends, the European magazine Music & Media wrote that "Fake Plastic Trees" "best illustrates [Radiohead's] ambitions". Writing for NME in May 1995, John Mulvey felt that it lacked substance. Both critics drew comparisons with the rock band U2. Mark Frith from Smash Hits gave "Fake Plastic Trees" two out of five, writing: "Mournfully slow and really unremarkable, this will probably only appeal to die-hard fans."

The Canadian singer-songwriter Alanis Morissette, whom Radiohead supported on tour in 1996, wrote that "Fake Plastic Trees" was one of her favourite songs: "It's this intangible, spiritual thing. It's a mood piece but lyrically [Yorke] delves into his own vulnerability and talks about materialism and fallibility ... His voice is fragile, but there's nothing premeditated about the way he performs." Morissette covered "Fake Plastic Trees" on her 1996 tour. It has also been covered by Hayley Williams and Vance Joy. In 2017, Pitchfork wrote that "Fake Plastic Trees" and another Bends song, "High and Dry", anticipated the "airbrushed" post-Britpop of Coldplay and Travis.

In 2003, Rolling Stone included "Fake Plastic Trees" at number 385 on its list of the "500 Greatest Songs of All Time". In 2011, Rolling Stone readers voted it the third-best Radiohead song, with the critic Andy Greene writing that it was one of Radiohead's most anthemic songs. In 2009, "Fake Plastic Trees" was voted the 28th-best song on the Triple J Hottest 100 of All Time list. In 2025, the Paste writer Sean Edgar wrote that it was "still an emotional tour de force guaranteed to make anyone with a soul cry in less than five minutes".

== Track listings ==
All tracks are written by Radiohead (Thom Yorke, Jonny Greenwood, Ed O'Brien, Colin Greenwood, Philip Selway).

- UK and European single (CD1)
- UK and New Zealand single (cassette) (Note: Same tracks appear on the two sides of the cassette tape.)
- Australian single (CD)
1. "Fake Plastic Trees" – 4:52
2. "India Rubber" – 3:26
3. "How Can You Be Sure?" – 4:21
- UK and European single (CD2)
1. "Fake Plastic Trees" – 4:52
2. "Fake Plastic Trees" (Acoustic Version) – 4:41
3. "Bullet Proof..I Wish I Was" (Acoustic Version) – 3:34
4. "Street Spirit (Fade Out)" (Acoustic Version) – 4:26
- UK and US promo (CD)
1. "Fake Plastic Trees" (Edit) (Note: Noted as (single edit) on the US promo.) – 4:11
2. "Fake Plastic Trees" (Album Version) – 4:50
- US single (CD)
1. "Fake Plastic Trees" (Album Version) – 4:50
2. "Planet Telex" (Hexidecimal Mix) – 6:44
3. "Killer Cars" – 3:02
4. "Fake Plastic Trees" (Acoustic Version) – 4:45
- US jukebox single (7")
1. "Fake Plastic Trees" – 4:50
2. "The Bends" – 4:03
- Dutch single (CD)
1. "Fake Plastic Trees" – 4:52
2. "India Rubber" – 3:26
3. "How Can You Be Sure?" – 4:21
4. "Fake Plastic Trees" (Acoustic Version) – 4:43

== Personnel ==
Radiohead

- Thom Yorke – vocals, acoustic guitar, string arrangements
- Jonny Greenwood – electric guitar, Hammond organ, string arrangements
- Ed O'Brien – electric guitar
- Colin Greenwood – bass
- Philip Selway – drums

Additional performers

- Caroline Lavelle – cello
- John Matthias – viola, violin

== Charts ==
=== Weekly charts ===
Chart (1995)	Peak position
Canada Rock/Alternative (RPM)	7
Europe (Eurochart Hot 100)	50
Israel (IBA)	28
New Zealand (Recorded Music NZ)	22
Scottish Singles Sales (Official Charts)	15
UK Singles (Official Charts)	20
US Radio Songs (Billboard)	65
US Alternative Airplay (Billboard)	11

=== Year-end charts ===
Chart (1995)	Position
Canada Rock/Alternative (RPM)	29

Chart (2001)	Position
Canada (Nielsen SoundScan)	192

== Certifications ==
Region	Certification	Certified units/sales
Canada (Music Canada)	Platinum	80,000^{‡}
New Zealand (RMNZ)	Platinum	30,000^{‡}
United Kingdom (BPI)	Platinum	600,000^{‡}
^{‡} Sales+streaming figures based on certification alone.

== Notes ==
=== Bibliography ===
- Randall, Mac (2011). Exit Music: The Radiohead Story. Omnibus Press. ISBN 978-1849384575.
