= The Bends (album) =

1995 studio album by Radiohead

Studio album by Radiohead
- Released: 13 March 1995
- Recorded: 1993 ("High and Dry"); February–November 1994
- Studios: RAK, London; The Manor, Oxfordshire; Abbey Road, London
- Genres: Alternative rock; indie rock; art rock; post-grunge; Britpop
- Length: 48:33
- Labels: Parlophone; Capitol
- Producers: John Leckie; Radiohead; Nigel Godrich; Jim Warren

Radiohead chronology
My Iron Lung (1994)	The Bends (1995)	OK Computer (1997)

Singles from The Bends
- 1. "My Iron Lung" Released: 26 September 1994; 2. "High and Dry / Planet Telex" Released: 27 February 1995; 3. "Fake Plastic Trees" Released: 15 May 1995; 4. "Just" Released: 21 August 1995; 5. "Street Spirit (Fade Out)" Released: 22 January 1996; 6. "The Bends" Released: 26 July 1996

The Bends is the second studio album by the English rock band Radiohead, released on 13 March 1995 by Parlophone. It was produced by John Leckie, with extra production by Radiohead, Nigel Godrich and Jim Warren. The Bends combines guitar songs and ballads, with more restrained arrangements and cryptic lyrics than Radiohead's debut album, Pablo Honey (1993).

Work began at RAK Studios, London, in February 1994. Tensions were high, with pressure from Parlophone to match sales of Radiohead's debut single, "Creep", and progress was slow. After an international tour in May and June, Radiohead resumed work at Abbey Road in London and the Manor in Oxfordshire. The Bends was the first Radiohead album recorded with Godrich and the artist Stanley Donwood, who have worked on every Radiohead album since.

Several singles were released: "My Iron Lung", the double A-side "High and Dry / Planet Telex", "Fake Plastic Trees", "Just", and Radiohead's first top-five entry on the UK singles chart, "Street Spirit (Fade Out)". "The Bends" was also released as a single in Ireland. A live video, Live at the Astoria, was released on VHS. Radiohead toured extensively for The Bends, including US tours supporting R.E.M. and Alanis Morissette.

The Bends reached number four on the UK Albums Chart. It sold slowly in the US, but sales grew through word of mouth, positive reviews and distinctive music videos. It was eventually certified platinum in the US and quadruple platinum in the UK. The Bends was nominated for Best British Album at the Brit Awards 1996 and elevated Radiohead from one-hit-wonders to one of the most recognised British bands, credited for influencing a generation of post-Britpop acts such as Coldplay, Muse and Travis. It is cited in best-of lists including Colin Larkin's All Time Top 1000 Albums and all three editions of Rolling Stone's lists of the 500 Greatest Albums of All Time.

== Background ==
Radiohead released their debut album, Pablo Honey, in 1993, featuring the hit single "Creep". They felt pressured by the success and mounting expectations. Following the world tour for Pablo Honey, the singer, Thom Yorke, became ill and Radiohead cancelled an appearance at the 1993 Reading Festival. He told NME: "Physically I'm completely fucked and mentally I've had enough."

According to some reports, Radiohead's record company, EMI, gave them six months to "get sorted" or be dropped. EMI's A&R head, Keith Wozencroft, denied this, saying: "Experimental rock music was getting played and had commercial potential. People voice different paranoias, but for the label [Radiohead] were developing brilliantly from Pablo Honey."

After Radiohead finished recording Pablo Honey, Yorke played the co-producer Paul Q. Kolderie a demo tape of new material with the working title The Benz. Kolderie was shocked to find the songs were "all better than anything on Pablo Honey". The guitarist Ed O'Brien said later: "After all that touring on Pablo Honey ... the songs that Thom was writing were so much better. Over a period of a year and a half, suddenly, bang." Kolderie credited Radiohead's Pablo Honey tours for "turning them into a tight band".

To produce their second album, Radiohead selected John Leckie, who had produced records by acts they admired, such as Magazine. Leckie did not like Pablo Honey, but saw potential in Radiohead's new demos, Yorke's vocals and the three-guitar lineup. The drummer, Philip Selway, said Radiohead were reassured by how relaxed and open-minded Leckie was on their first meeting. According to O'Brien, the success of "Creep" meant that Radiohead were not in debt to EMI and so had more freedom on their next album. EMI asked Radiohead to deliver a followup to "Creep" for the American market; however, according to Leckie, Radiohead had disowned "Creep" and did not "think in terms of making hit singles".

Recording was postponed so Leckie could work on the album Carnival of Light, by another Oxford band, Ride. Radiohead used the extra time to rehearse in a disused barn on an Oxfordshire fruit farm in January 1994. Yorke said: "We had all of these songs and we really liked them, but we knew them almost too well ... so we had to sort of learn to like them again before we could record them, which is odd."

== Recording ==
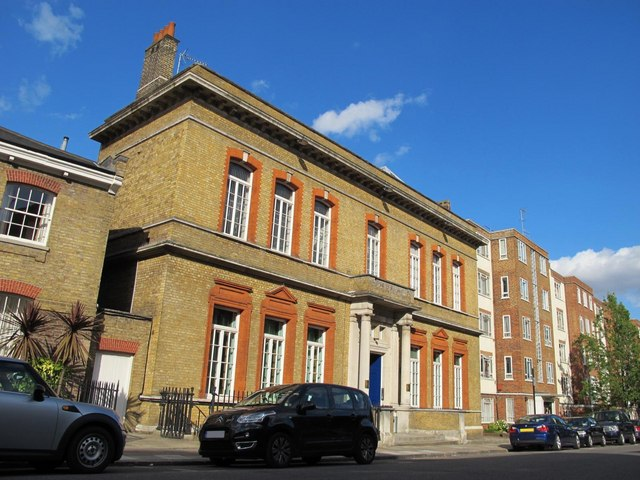
Radiohead spent several weeks recording at RAK Studios, London.

EMI gave Radiohead nine weeks to record the album, planning to release it in October 1994. Work began at RAK Studios in London in February 1994. Yorke would arrive at the studio early and work alone at the piano; according to Leckie, "New songs were pouring out of him." The band praised Leckie for demystifying the studio environment. The guitarist Jonny Greenwood said: "He didn't treat us like he had some kind of witchcraft that only he understands. There's no mystery to it, which is so refreshing." Leckie said Radiohead were "very democratic" and that each member's opinion was valid, which slowed the recording process.

Whereas Pablo Honey was mostly written by Yorke, The Bends saw greater collaboration. Previously, all three guitarists had often played identical parts, creating a "dense, fuzzy wall" of sound. Their Bends roles were more divided, with Yorke generally playing rhythm, Greenwood lead and O'Brien providing effects. O'Brien described the Boss DD-5, a delay pedal, as important to the album's sound. The band also created more restrained arrangements; in O'Brien's words: "We were very aware of something on The Bends that we weren't aware of on Pablo Honey... If it sounded really great with Thom playing acoustic with Phil and [Colin], what was the point in trying to add something more?"

"Planet Telex" began with a drum loop taken from another song, the B-side "Killer Cars", and was written and recorded in a single evening at RAK. "(Nice Dream)" began as a simple four-chord song by Yorke, and was expanded with extra parts by O'Brien and Greenwood. Much of "Just" was written by Greenwood, who, according to Yorke, "was trying to get as many chords as he could into a song". Not satisfied with the versions of "My Iron Lung" recorded at RAK, Radiohead used a live recording from the London Astoria, with Yorke's vocals replaced and the audience removed.

Radiohead made several efforts to record "Fake Plastic Trees". O'Brien likened one version to the Guns N' Roses song "November Rain", saying it was "pompous and bombastic ... just the worst". Eventually, Leckie recorded Yorke playing "Fake Plastic Trees" alone, which the rest of the band used to build the final song. "High and Dry" was recorded the previous year at Courtyard Studios, Oxfordshire, by Radiohead's live sound engineer, Jim Warren. Yorke later said it was a "very bad" song that EMI had pressured him into releasing.

"The Bends", "(Nice Dream)" and "Just" were identified as potential singles and became the focus of the early sessions, which created tension. Leckie recalled: "We had to give those absolute attention, make them amazing, instant smash hits, number one in America. Everyone was pulling their hair out saying, 'It's not good enough!' We were trying too hard." Yorke in particular struggled with the pressure, and Radiohead's co-manager Chris Hufford considered quitting, citing Yorke's "mistrust of everybody". Jonny Greenwood spent days testing new guitar equipment, searching for a distinctive sound, before reverting to his Telecaster. The bassist, Colin Greenwood, described the period as "eight weeks of hell and torture". According to Yorke, "We had days of painful self-analysis, a total fucking meltdown for two fucking months." O'Brien said each member examined their options for leaving their contracts.

With the October deadline abandoned, recording paused in May and June while Radiohead toured Europe, Japan and Australasia. Work resumed for two weeks in July at the Manor studio in Oxfordshire, where Radiohead completed songs including "Bones", "Sulk" and "The Bends". This was followed by tours of the UK, Thailand and Mexico. In Mexico, the band members had a major argument. Yorke said: "Years of tension and not saying anything to each other, and basically all the things that had built up since we'd met each other, all came out in one day. We were spitting and fighting and crying and saying all the things that you don't want to talk about. It completely changed and we went back and did the album and it all made sense." The tour gave Radiohead a new sense of purpose and their relationships improved. Hufford encouraged them to make the album they wanted instead of worrying about "product and units".

Recording ended in November 1994 at Abbey Road Studios in London. Selway said the album was recorded in about four months total. While Leckie mixed The Bends at Abbey Road, EMI grew concerned that he was taking too long. Without his knowledge, they enlisted Sean Slade and Paul Q. Kolderie, who had produced Pablo Honey. Leckie disliked their mixes, finding them "brash", but later said: "I went through a bit of trauma at the time, but maybe they chose the best thing." Only three of Leckie's mixes were used.

The Bends was Radiohead's first collaboration with Nigel Godrich, who engineered the RAK sessions. When Leckie left the studio to attend a social engagement, Godrich and the band stayed to record B-sides. One song, "Black Star", was included on the album. Godrich produced all of Radiohead's later albums.

== Music ==
The Bends has been described as alternative rock, indie rock, art rock, and post-grunge. Like Pablo Honey, it features guitar-oriented rock songs, but its songs are "more spacey and odd", according to The Gazette's Bill Reed. The music is more eclectic than Pablo Honey, and Colin Greenwood said The Bends better represented their style. Pitchfork wrote that it contrasts warmth and tension, riffs and texture, and rock and post-rock. Several critics identified it as a Britpop album, though Radiohead disliked Britpop, seeing it as a "backwards-looking" pastiche.

The critic Simon Reynolds wrote that The Bends brought an "English art rock element" to the fore of Radiohead's sound. According to Kolderie, "The Bends was neither an English album nor an American album. It's an album made in the void of touring and travelling. It really had that feeling of, 'We don't live anywhere and we don't belong anywhere.'" Reed described it as "intriguingly disturbed" and "bipolar". He likened "The Bends" to the late music of the Beatles, described "My Iron Lung" as hard rock, and noted more subdued sounds on "Bullet Proof ... I Wish I Was" and "High and Dry", showcasing Radiohead's "more plaintive and meditative side".

Rolling Stone described The Bends as a "mix of sonic guitar anthems and striking ballads", with lyrics evoking a "haunted landscape" of sickness, consumerism, jealousy and longing. Several songs evoke a "sense of a disintegrated or disconnected subject". The journalist Mac Randall described the lyrics as "a veritable compendium of disease, disgust and depression" that nonetheless become uplifting in the context of the "inviting" and "powerful" arrangements. Jonny Greenwood said The Bends was about "illness and doctors... revulsion about our own bodies". Yorke said it was "an incredibly personal album, which is why I spent most of my time denying that it was personal at all". The album title, a term for decompression sickness, references Radiohead's rapid rise to fame with "Creep". Yorke said, "We just came up too fast."

In "Fake Plastic Trees", Yorke laments the effects of consumerism on modern relationships. It was inspired by the commercial development of Canary Wharf and a performance by Jeff Buckley, who inspired Yorke to use falsetto. Sasha Frere-Jones compared its melody to the "second theme of a Schubert string quartet". In "Just", Jonny Greenwood plays octatonic scales that extend over four octaves, influenced by the 1978 Magazine song "Shot by Both Sides". He used a DigiTech Whammy pedal to pitch-shift the solo into a high, piercing frequency. He also used the Whammy for the opening riff of "My Iron Lung", creating a "glitchy, lo-fi" sound. According to Randall, "My Iron Lung" transitions from a "jangly" opening hook to a "McCartney-esque verse melody" and "pulverising guitar explosions" in the bridge. "Street Spirit (Fade Out)" was inspired by R.E.M. and the 1991 novel The Famished Road by Ben Okri; the lyrics detail an escape from an oppressive reality. The journalist Rob Sheffield described "Street Spirit", "Planet Telex" and "High and Dry" as a "big-band dystopian epic".

The Bends is dedicated to the American comedian Bill Hicks. Yorke said Hicks "was able to make things that were incredibly frightening funny, and by doing that make them seem okay".

== Artwork ==
The Bends was the first Radiohead album with artwork by Stanley Donwood, who has worked with Yorke to create all of Radiohead's artwork since. Donwood met Yorke while they were students at the University of Exeter, and first created artwork for Radiohead for the My Iron Lung EP. For The Bends, Yorke and Donwood entered John Radcliffe Hospital in Oxford with a video camera to film an iron lung, but found it visually boring. Instead, they filmed a CPR mannequin, displayed the footage on a television and photographed the screen. They stretched the image to distort it and exaggerate the expression. In 2025, the Paste critic Sean Edgar wrote that the image was "a fitting metaphor for a band on the cusp of escaping the corporeal restraints of traditional music to explore an uncharted sonic wilderness".

== Release ==
The Bends was released at the height of Britpop, when the British music charts were dominated by bands such as Oasis and Blur, and initially made little impact. It was released in Japan on 8 March 1995 by EMI, and in the UK on 13 March by Parlophone Records. It spent 16 weeks on the UK Albums Chart, reaching number four. On the same day as the UK release, Radiohead's performance at the London Astoria in May 1994 was released on VHS as Live at the Astoria, including several Bends tracks.

In the US, The Bends was released on 4 April by EMI's North American subsidiary, Capitol Records. According to the journalist Tim Footman, Capitol almost refused to release it, feeling it lacked hit singles. It debuted at the bottom of the US Billboard 200 in the week of 13 May and reached number 147 in the week of 24 June. However, its US sales slowly improved. It re-entered the chart in the week of 17 February 1996, and reached number 88 on 20 April, almost exactly a year after its release. On 4 April, The Bends was certified gold in the US for sales of half a million copies. Though it remains Radiohead's lowest-charting album in the US, it was certified platinum in January 1999 for sales of one million.

Interest from influential musicians such as the R.E.M. vocalist Michael Stipe, combined with several distinctive music videos, helped sustain Radiohead's popularity outside the UK. The US critic Barry Walters wrote that the videos "confirmed that this was a band that was nailing the sweet spot between accessibility and mystery". "Fake Plastic Trees" was used in the 1995 film Clueless and introduced Radiohead to a larger American audience. According to the MTV host Matt Pinfield, record companies would ask why MTV kept promoting The Bends when it was selling less than their albums; his reply was: "Because it's great!" Yorke thanked Pinfield by giving him a gold record of The Bends.

The Bends slowly found fans through word of mouth. Selway credited the videos for helping The Bends "gradually seep into people's consciousness". Colin Greenwood wrote later: "I spoke to so many music writers who'd received The Bends as a promo, left it to gather dust on top of their PC tower, and hadn't bothered to play it until word of mouth nudged them." By the end of 1996, The Bends had sold around two million copies worldwide. In the UK, it was certified platinum in February 1996 for sales of over 300,000, and was certified quadruple platinum in July 2013.

=== Singles ===
In September 1994, EMI released the My Iron Lung EP, comprising "My Iron Lung" plus Bends outtakes. "My Iron Lung" was also released as a single. EMI intended it as a release for fans rather than as the lead single for The Bends.

According to Hufford, American audiences were disappointed by the lack of a "Creep"-style song on The Bends. In response, Capitol chose "Fake Plastic Trees" as the first US single, to further distance Radiohead from "Creep". It failed to enter the US Billboard Hot 100, but reached number 20 on the UK singles chart. "Just", released in the UK on August 21, reached number 19. It was not released as a single in the US, but its music video, directed by Jamie Thraves, received attention there. The next US single, the double A-side "High and Dry" and "Planet Telex", reached number 78. "Street Spirit (Fade Out)", released in January 1996, reached number five on the UK singles chart, surpassing "Creep" and demonstrating that Radiohead were not one-hit wonders. "The Bends" was released as a single in Ireland and reached number 26 on the Irish Singles Chart in August 1996.

=== Tours ===
Radiohead toured extensively for The Bends, with performances in North America, Europe and Japan. They first toured in support of Soul Asylum, then R.E.M., one of their formative influences and one of the world's biggest rock bands at the time. Yorke said of touring with R.E.M: "Everything that we've come to expect was completely turned on its head. Like the idea that you get to a certain level and you lose it. Everything was amicable and there was no bitchiness or pettiness about it." The US tour included a performance at the KROQ Almost Acoustic Christmas concert at the Universal Amphitheatre in Los Angeles, alongside Oasis, Alanis Morissette, No Doubt and Porno for Pyros. The Capitol employee Clark Staub described the performance as a "key stepping stone" for Radiohead in the US. In March 2025, the 30th anniversary of The Bends, Radiohead posted footage of Yorke performing at the Horseshoe Tavern in Toronto on 28 March 1995.

Before a performance in New York City, Yorke suffered a breakdown and begged Radiohead's tour manager to book him a flight home; his bandmates persuaded him to stay. In November 1995, Yorke became sick and collapsed on stage at a show in Munich. NME covered the incident in a story titled "Thommy's Temper Tantrum". Yorke said it was the most hurtful thing anyone had written about him and refused to give interviews to NME for five years. Before a performance in Denver, Colorado, Radiohead's tour van was stolen and with it their musical equipment. Yorke and Jonny Greenwood performed a stripped-down set with rented instruments and several shows were cancelled. Greenwood was reunited with his stolen Fender Telecaster Plus in 2015 after a fan recognised it as one they had purchased in Denver in the 1990s.

In March 1996, Radiohead toured the US again and performed on The Tonight Show and 120 Minutes. In mid-1996, they played at European festivals including Pinkpop in Holland, Torhout Werchter in Belgium and T in the Park in Scotland. That August, Radiohead toured as the opening act for Alanis Morissette, performing early versions of songs from their next album, OK Computer. Morissette said later: "It was really grounding for me to be with such bona-fide-to-the-bone artists. It felt really validating because the industry was very wild and patriarchal, so to be on the road with such true savants was a gift for me."

== Critical reception ==
Contemporary reviews
Review scores
Source	Rating
Chicago Tribune	1/4 stars
Entertainment Weekly	B+
The Guardian	4/4 stars
Los Angeles Times	3/4 stars
NME	9/10
Q	4/5 stars
Rolling Stone	3.5/5 stars
Select	4/5
Spin	5/10
The Village Voice	C

The Bends brought Radiohead significant critical attention. The Guardian critic Caroline Sullivan wrote that Radiohead had "transformed themselves from nondescript guitar-beaters to potential arena-fillers ... The grandeur may eventually pall, as it has with U2, but it's been years since big bumptious rock sounded this emotional." Q described The Bends as a "powerful, bruised, majestically desperate record of frighteningly good songs". In NME, Mark Sutherland wrote that "Radiohead clearly resolved to make an album so stunning it would make people forget their own name, never mind ['Creep']", describing it as "the consummate, all-encompassing, continent-straddling '90s rock record". Dave Morrison of Select wrote that The Bends "captures and clarifies a much wider trawl of moods than Pablo Honey" and praised Radiohead as "one of the UK's big league, big-rock assets". NME and Melody Maker named The Bends among the top ten albums of the year.

Critical reception in the US was mixed. Chuck Eddy of Spin deemed much of The Bends "nodded-out nonsense mumble, not enough concrete emotion". Kevin McKeough from the Chicago Tribune panned Yorke's lyrics as "self-absorbed" and the music as overblown and pretentious, and said there was "little on the British group's second record to suggest they'll be more than one-hit wonders". In The Village Voice, Robert Christgau wrote that the guitar parts and expressions of angst were skilful and natural, but lacked depth: "The words achieve precisely the same pitch of aesthetic necessity as the music, which is none at all." In the Los Angeles Times, Sandy Morris praised Yorke as "almost as enticingly enigmatic as Smashing Pumpkins' Billy Corgan, though of a more delicate constitution".

== Legacy ==
Retrospective reviews
Review scores
Source	Rating
AllMusic	5/5 stars
The A.V. Club	A
Blender	5/5 stars
Encyclopedia of Popular Music	5/5 stars
Entertainment Weekly	A
Pitchfork	10/10
Q	5/5 stars
Rolling Stone	4/5 stars
The Rolling Stone Album Guide	5/5 stars
Uncut	4/5 stars

The journalist Rob Sheffield said that The Bends "shocked the world", elevating Radiohead from "pasty British boys to a very 70s kind of UK art-rock godhead". It attracted interest from high-profile musicians and film stars. Two years after its release, the Guardian critic Caroline Sullivan wrote that The Bends had transformed Radiohead from one hit-wonders into one of the most respected British bands. The Rolling Stone journalist Jordan Runtagh wrote in 2012 that The Bends was "a musically dense and emotionally complex masterwork that erased their one-hit-wonder status forever". Another Rolling Stone critic, Barry Walters, who once dismissed Radiohead as one of "plenty of second-hand, third-tier, fake-Seattle bands canvassing the US", wrote that The Bends had "sustained the tunes that supported their seriousness, and put the 'Creep'-enabled money being thrown at them to good use".

The writer Nick Hornby wrote in 2000 that, with The Bends, Radiohead "found their voice ... No other contemporary band has managed to mix such a cocktail of rage, sarcasm, self-pity, exquisite tunefulness and braininess." Writing for Uncut in 2001, Stephen Dalton wrote: "This dark masterpiece was a massive leap forward from Pablo Honey. Beyond the typically fraught, lurching guitar anthems it boasted grace and grandeur, epic soundtracks and programmed rhythms." Another Uncut writer, Sam Richards, wrote in 2009: "The '90s music press analysis of a sudden epiphany occurring between Pablo Honey and The Bends seems like overstating the case. Many of the musical and lyrical themes are similar but The Bends is simply more focused, better written, less anxious and allows Thom Yorke's voice more room." The Pitchfork critic Scott Plagenhoef wrote that The Bends was a "more approachable and loveable version" of Radiohead and remained many fans' favourite album. Tim Karan of Diffuser wrote that while some regard The Bends as simplistic compared to Radiohead's later albums, it was significant for its role in their development as "the world's most innovative band".

In 1997, Jonny Greenwood said The Bends had been a "turning point" for Radiohead: "It started appearing in people's [best of] polls for the end of the year. That's when it started to feel like we made the right choice about being a band." The success gave Radiohead the confidence to self-produce their next album, OK Computer (1997), with Godrich. In 2015, Selway said The Bends originated the "Radiohead aesthetic", aided by Donwood's artwork. In 2026, Jonny Greenwood said it was superior to Pablo Honey because "it felt like us getting back to what we'd been like five years earlier when we were still a school band". O'Brien said The Bends was the first album on which Radiohead created something new. He felt it was more diverse than Pablo Honey, citing the "power and sonic playfulness" of "Planet Telex" and the "emotion" of "Street Spirit".

=== Influence ===
The Bends influenced a generation of British and Irish acts, including Coldplay, Keane, James Blunt, Muse, Athlete, Elbow, Snow Patrol, Kodaline, Turin Brakes and Travis. Pitchfork credited songs as such as "High and Dry" and "Fake Plastic Trees" for anticipating the "airbrushed" post-Britpop of Coldplay and Travis, and argued that The Bends presented a transition from Britpop to "the more feminine, emotionally engaging music that would emerge in the UK a few years later", led by OK Computer. Acts including Garbage, R.E.M. and k.d. lang began to cite Radiohead as a favourite band. The Cure contacted Radiohead to inquire about The Bends' production in the hope of replicating it.

In 2006, The Observer named The Bends one of "the 50 albums that changed music", saying it had popularised an "angst-laden falsetto ... a thoughtful opposite to the chest-beating lad-rock personified by Oasis" that "eventually coalesced into an entire decade of sound". Yorke held contempt for the style of rock The Bends popularised, feeling other acts had copied him. He said in 2006: "I was really, really upset about it, and I tried my absolute best not to be, but yeah, it was kind of like— that sort of thing of missing the point completely." Godrich felt Yorke was oversensitive and had not invented "guys singing in falsetto with an acoustic guitar".

=== Accolades ===
In 2000, in a poll of more than 200,000 music fans and journalists, The Bends was voted the second-greatest album of all time behind Revolver (1966) by the Beatles. Q readers voted it the second-best album in 1998 and 2006, behind OK Computer. Colin Larkin named it the second-best album in the 2000 edition of All Time Top 1000 Albums, and it was included in the 2005 book 1001 Albums You Must Hear Before You Die. Rolling Stone included The Bends at number 110 on its 2003 list of the 500 Greatest Albums of All Time, number 111 in its 2012 list, and number 276 in its 2020 list. In 2003, Rolling Stone included "Fake Plastic Trees" at number 385 on its list of the 500 Greatest Songs of All Time.

In 2006, The Bends was voted the 10th-greatest album in a worldwide poll organised by British Hit Singles & Albums and NME. In 2012, Paste named it the 11th-greatest album of the 1990s. In 2017, Pitchfork named The Bends the third-greatest Britpop album, writing that its "epic portrayal of drift and disenchantment secures its reluctant spot in Britpop's pantheon". In 2020, the Independent named it the best album of 1995, writing: "Downbeat, melancholic, yet wonderfully melodic and uplifting ... The Bends stood apart from Britpop and everything else in the storied year of 1995." In 2025, Paste named it the fifteenth-best, saying it "not only paid homage to the psychedelic alt rock [Radiohead] once idealised, but nearly perfected it".

=== Reissues ===
Radiohead left EMI after their contract ended in 2003. In 2007, EMI released Radiohead Box Set, a compilation of albums recorded while Radiohead were signed to EMI, including The Bends. On 31 August 2009, EMI reissued The Bends and other Radiohead albums in a "Collector's Edition" compiling B-sides and live performances. Radiohead had no input into the reissue and the music was not remastered.

In February 2013, Parlophone was bought by Warner Music Group (WMG). In April 2016, as a result of an agreement with the trade group Impala, WMG transferred Radiohead's back catalogue to XL Recordings. The EMI reissues, released without Radiohead's consent, were removed from streaming services. In May 2016, XL reissued Radiohead's back catalogue on vinyl, including The Bends.

== Track listing ==
All songs written by Radiohead.

The Bends track listing
No.	Title	Length
1.	"Planet Telex"	4:19
2.	"The Bends"	4:06
3.	"High and Dry"	4:17
4.	"Fake Plastic Trees"	4:50
5.	"Bones"	3:09
6.	"(Nice Dream)"	3:53
7.	"Just"	3:54
8.	"My Iron Lung"	4:36
9.	"Bullet Proof... I Wish I Was"	3:28
10.	"Black Star"	4:07
11.	"Sulk"	3:42
12.	"Street Spirit (Fade Out)"	4:12
Total length:		48:33

== Personnel ==
Taken from the liner notes, except where noted.

Radiohead

- Thom Yorke – voice, guitar, piano; string arrangements
- Jonny Greenwood – guitar, organ, recorder, synthesiser, piano; string arrangements
- Ed O'Brien – guitar, voice
- Colin Greenwood – bass
- Philip Selway – drums

Additional musicians

- Caroline Lavelle – cello
- John Matthias – viola, violin

Production

- John Leckie – production (all except 3 and 10), mixing (tracks 8, 12), engineering, additional mixing (track 2)
- Radiohead – production (tracks 3, 10), mixing (track 8)
- Nigel Godrich – production (track 10), engineering
- Jim Warren – production (track 3)
- Sean Slade – mixing (tracks 1–7, 9–11)
- Paul Q. Kolderie – mixing (tracks 1–7, 9–11)
- Chris Brown – engineering
- Guy Massey – engineering assistance
- Shelley Saunders – engineering assistance
- Chris Blair – mastering

Design

- Stanley Donwood – artwork
- The White Chocolate Farm – artwork
- Green Ink – painting

== Charts ==
=== Weekly charts ===
Weekly chart performance for The Bends
Chart (1995–96)	Peak position
Australian Albums (ARIA)	23
Austrian Albums (Ö3 Austria)	37
Belgian Albums (Ultratop Flanders)	8
Belgian Albums (Ultratop Wallonia)	26
Canadian Albums (The Record)	14
Dutch Albums (Album Top 100)	20
European Albums (European Top 100 Albums)	17
German Albums (Offizielle Top 100)	73
New Zealand Albums (RMNZ)	8
Scottish Albums (Official Charts)	7
Swedish Albums (Sverigetopplistan)	26
UK Albums (Official Charts)	4
US Billboard 200	88
Chart (2008-2010)	Peak position
Italian Albums (FIMI)	88
Norwegian Albums (VG-lista)	32
Chart (2015-2026)	Peak position
Croatian International Albums (HDU)	9
Portuguese Albums (AFP)	29
UK Album Downloads (Official Charts)	30
UK Independent Albums (Official Charts)	4
UK Vinyl Albums (OCC)	4

=== Year-end charts ===
1995 year-end chart performance for The Bends
Chart (1995)	Position
New Zealand Albums (RMNZ)	34
UK Albums (OCC)	56

1996 year-end chart performance for The Bends
Chart (1996)	Position
Dutch Albums (Album Top 100)	97
European Albums (European Top 100 Albums)	97
New Zealand Albums (RMNZ)	33
UK Albums (OCC)	43

2025 year-end chart performance for The Bends
Chart (2025)	Position
Belgian Albums (Ultratop Flanders)	169
Icelandic Albums (Tónlistinn)	99

== Certifications ==
Certifications for The Bends
Region	Certification	Certified units/sales
Argentina (CAPIF)	Gold	30,000^{^}
Belgium (BRMA)	Gold	25,000^{*}
Canada (Music Canada)	3× Platinum	300,000^{^}
Italy (FIMI) sales since 2009	Gold	25,000^{‡}
Netherlands (NVPI)	Gold	50,000^{^}
New Zealand (RMNZ)	Platinum	15,000^{^}
United Kingdom (BPI)	4× Platinum	1,248,350
United States (RIAA)	Platinum	1,540,000
Summaries
Europe (IFPI)	Platinum	1,000,000^{*}
^{*} Sales figures based on certification alone.^{^} Shipments figures based on certification alone.^{‡} Sales+streaming figures based on certification alone.

== Bibliography ==
- Randall, Mac (2000). Exit Music: The Radiohead Story. Omnibus Press. ISBN 0-7119-7977-4.
- Randall, Mac (2004). Exit Music: The Radiohead Story. Omnibus. ISBN 1-84449-183-8.
- Randall, Mac (1 February 2012). Exit Music: The Radiohead Story Updated Edition. Backbeat Books. ISBN 978-1-4584-7147-5.
