= Lewis (robot) =

Photography robot

Lewis (named after Meriwether Lewis) is an autonomous robot that performs the job of a wedding photographer: it attends social events, moves around, and takes digital photographs of people. It is a research project of the Media and Machines Laboratory at Washington University in St. Louis.

Lewis has been featured on slashdot, on CNN's website, and in various North American newspapers.

In 2002, Lewis received -- and declined -- an invitation to Nelly's 24th birthday party.
