= Justice Lewis =

Justice Lewis may refer to:

- Charles Lundy Lewis (1852–1936), associate justice of the Minnesota Supreme Court
- Clive Lewis (judge) (born 1960), judge of the High Court of Justice of England
- David Lewis (Indiana judge) (1909–1985), associate justice of the Indiana Supreme Court
- Edward Augustus Lewis (1820–1889), associate justice of the Supreme Court of Missouri
- Edmund H. Lewis (1884–1972), chief judge of the New York Court of Appeals
- Ellis Lewis (1798–1871), associate justice and chief justice of the Supreme Court of Pennsylvania
- Henry T. Lewis (1847–1903), associate justice of the Supreme Court of Georgia
- James F. Lewis (1836–1886), associate justice of the Supreme Court of Nevada
- James Woodrow Lewis (1912–1999), chief justice of the South Carolina Supreme Court
- Johnnie Lewis (1946–2015), chief justice of Liberia
- Joshua Lewis (judge) (1772–1833), one of three judges of the Superior court of the Territory of Orleans
- Lunsford L. Lewis (1846–1920), associate justice of the Supreme Court of Virginia
- R. Fred Lewis (born 1947), associate justice of the Supreme Court of Florida
- Rhoda Valentine Lewis (1906–1991), associate justice of the Supreme Court of Hawaii
- Theodore G. Lewis (1890–1934), associate justice of the Wisconsin Supreme Court
- Walter Lewis (judge) (1849–1930), chief justice of British Honduras

== See also ==
- Judge Lewis (disambiguation)
