= Lewis Township, Pennsylvania =

Lewis Township is the name of some places in the U.S. state of Pennsylvania:

Located in this fine township of Union County is Millmont and Hartleton.

- Lewis Township, Lycoming County, Pennsylvania
- Lewis Township, Northumberland County, Pennsylvania
- Lewis Township, Union County, Pennsylvania
