= Just (song) =

1995 single by Radiohead

Single by Radiohead

from the album The Bends
- Released: 21 August 1995
- Recorded: 1994
- Genre: Alternative rock; Britpop; grunge; experimental rock
- Length: 3:55
- Label: Parlophone
- Songwriter: Radiohead
- Producer: John Leckie

Radiohead singles chronology
"Fake Plastic Trees" (1995)	"Just" (1995)	"Street Spirit (Fade Out)" (1996)

Music video
- "Just" on YouTube

"Just" is a song by the English rock band Radiohead, included on their second album, The Bends (1995). It features an angular guitar riff played by Jonny Greenwood, inspired by the band Magazine. It was released as a single on 21 August 1995 by Parlophone and reached number 19 on the UK singles chart. The music video was directed by Jamie Thraves. In 2008, "Just" was included in Radiohead: The Best Of.

The English musician and producer Mark Ronson recorded a cover of "Just" for the 2006 Radiohead tribute album Exit Music: Songs with Radio Heads. It reached number 48 on the UK singles chart and number 36 on the Scottish Singles Chart. In 2008, it was rereleased as the fourth single from Ronson's second album, Version, and reached number 31 on the UK singles chart.

== Recording ==
The singer, Thom Yorke, said "Just" was written "on a freezing cold farm" in 1994, when Radiohead were worried they would only be remembered for their debut single, "Creep". Much of it was written by the lead guitarist, Jonny Greenwood. According to Yorke, Greenwood "was trying to get as many chords as he could into a song". Greenwood's angular guitar riff was influenced by John McGeoch's playing on the 1978 Magazine song "Shot by Both Sides", which Radiohead have also covered; Greenwood said that it was "pretty much the same kind of idea".

"Just" was produced by John Leckie, who had also produced "Shot by Both Sides". It was the first song Radiohead finished while working on their second album, The Bends (1995), at RAK Studios. According to the guitarist Ed O'Brien, earlier versions were about seven minutes long. Yorke said it was the most exciting thing Radiohead had recorded up to that point.

== Music ==
"Just" begins with a strummed guitar, which the critic Mac Randall likened to the 1991 Nirvana song "Smells Like Teen Spirit". Greenwood plays octatonic scales that extend over four octaves. In the solo, he uses a DigiTech Whammy pedal to pitch-shift his guitar into a high, piercing frequency. The lyrics describe someone in a bad relationship, with a "malicious" vocal vibrato from Yorke. The Guardian placed the song between grunge and Britpop.

== Music video ==
In the "Just" music video, a man lies on the pavement, attracting attention from passersby. The members of Radiohead watch from an apartment above. The conversations are displayed in subtitles; the passersby ask why the man is lying down, but he refuses to explain. Eventually, the man explains, but his explanation is not subtitled. The bystanders lie down next to him.

The video was directed by Jamie Thraves, who adapted it from an idea he had for a short film. It took two days to shoot. The street scenes were filmed on Liverpool Street, London and around Liverpool Street station; the scenes of the band were filmed on a set. Thraves said the art direction was inspired by the 1970 film The Conformist, and he cast the main actor for his resemblance to the actor Jean-Louis Trintignant. According to Thraves, though Radiohead were relatively unknown at the time, everyone involved in the video knew they were working with a "groundbreaking band ... we all knew there was magic". The actor Dorian Lough said he developed a spiral fracture from having to trip over the man on the pavement for several takes.

PopMatters described the video as "cryptic, artistic, and solemn". The mystery of what the man says to the bystanders triggered speculation. Thraves said there was "a very real logical and simple answer" but that it would "kill the video" to reveal it.

== Release ==
"Just" was released in the UK on August 21 and reached number 19 on the UK singles chart. It was not released as a single in the US, but its music video received attention there. In 2008, "Just" was included in Radiohead: The Best Of.

== Reception ==
In August 1995, Jordan Paramor from Smash Hits gave "Just" four out of five, writing: "Their songs are tricky 'cos you always think they're a tad dull the first time you hear them 'cos nothing really seems to happen, but give them a chance and they soon blow your trews off! This is slow, yet groovy, good to chill out to yet upbeat enough to be danceable." In 2007, NME named "Just" the 34th-greatest "indie anthem". In 2017, NME named the guitar solo one of the greatest of all time. In 2020, the Guardian named "Just" the 32nd-greatest Radiohead song, writing: "Hailstorm distortion meets perky hooks, wily vocals and ... an absurd pageant of guitar chords. The chorus flips the grunge ethos on its head, swapping self-loathing for theatrical vitriol."

== Track listings ==
UK CD1 and cassette single

1. "Just" – 3:52
2. "Planet Telex" (Karma Sunra mix) – 5:21 (remix by U.N.K.L.E.)
3. "Killer Cars" (Mogadon version) – 3:49 (remix by John Leckie)

UK CD2

1. "Just" – 3:52
2. "Bones" (live) – 3:13
3. "Planet Telex" (live) – 4:07
4. "Anyone Can Play Guitar" (live) – 3:39

Australian CD single

1. "Just" (album version) – 3:52
2. "Bones" (live) – 3:13

== Personnel ==
- Thom Yorke – vocals, electric and acoustic guitars
- Jonny Greenwood – electric guitar, Hammond organ
- Ed O'Brien – electric guitar
- Colin Greenwood – bass
- Philip Selway – drums

== Charts ==
Chart (1995)	Peak position
Canada Rock/Alternative (RPM)	7
Israel (IBA)	33
Scotland (OCC)	18
UK singles (OCC)	19
US Alternative Airplay (Billboard)	37

== Certifications ==
Region	Certification	Certified units/sales
Canada (Music Canada)	Gold	40,000^{‡}
New Zealand (RMNZ)	Gold	15,000^{‡}
United Kingdom (BPI)	Gold	400,000^{‡}
^{‡} Sales+streaming figures based on certification alone.

== Release history ==
Region	Date	Format(s)	Label(s)	Ref.
United Kingdom	21 August 1995	CD1; cassette	Parlophone	
United Kingdom	28 August 1995	CD2	Parlophone	

== Mark Ronson version ==
"Just"

Single by Mark Ronson featuring Alex Greenwald/Phantom Planet

from the album Exit Music and Version
- Released: 13 March 2006
- Studio: Allido Sound (New York City); MCP Pacific View
- Genre: Funk; R&B; Electronic; Alternative rock
- Length: 5:21; 3:51 (radio edit)
- Label: RCA; Sony (reissue)
- Songwriters: Thom Yorke; Jonny Greenwood; Colin Greenwood; Ed O'Brien; Philip Selway
- Producer: Mark Ronson

Mark Ronson singles chronology
"NYC Rules" (2004)	"Just" (2006)	"Stop Me" (2007)
"Valerie" (2007)	"Just (re-release)" (2008)	"Bang Bang Bang" (2010)

Alex Greenwald singles chronology
"Just" (2006)	"Shake" (2021)

Phantom Planet singles chronology
"Our House" (2005)	"Just (re-release)" (2008)	"Do the Panic" (2008)

Music videos
- "Just" (Version 1) on YouTube; "Just" (Version 2) on YouTube

For the 2006 Radiohead tribute album Exit Music: Songs with Radio Heads, the English producer Mark Ronson released a cover of "Just" featuring the vocalist Alex Greenwald and the bassist Sam Farrar of the American rock band Phantom Planet. Ronson's version adds funk and R&B elements, with horns, syncopated guitar and a Funkadelic-like bassline.

A music video was created by the Motion Group and Abbey Road Video Services featuring graffiti in London. Ronson's cover was released as a single digitally on 13 March 2006 and reached number 48 on the UK singles chart and number 36 on the Scottish Singles Chart. O'Brien said he liked the cover. According to Ronson: "He was quizzically amused. Even for somebody who makes such progressive music, I had done something that had even stumped him a little bit."

In February 2008, Ronson's version of "Just" was rereleased as a single from his second album, Version, and reached number 31 on the UK singles chart. It was promoted with a new video directed by Jim Canty. It parodies the original Radiohead video, with a sanitation worker mocking a group of people lying on the street while Ronson and Greenwald watch from above.

Pitchfork gave Version a negative review, but said "Just" was "the standout". The Guardian critic Alexis Petridis wrote that it was "both funkier and more spine-tingling than you would expect any record involving a guest vocal from ho-hum LA rockers Phantom Planet to be".

=== Track listing ===
Download
No.	Title	Length
1.	"Just"	5:21
2.	"Just" (radio edit)	3:51

7" vinyl

1. "Just"
2. "Just" (radio edit)

=== Charts ===
Chart (2006)	Peak position
Scottish Singles Sales (Official Charts)	36
UK Singles (Official Charts)	48

=== Track listings ===
Just - EP
No.	Title	Length
1.	"Just" (Radio edit)	3:13
2.	"Just" (DJ Premier's justremixitmix) (featuring Blaq Poet)	3:56
3.	"Just" (The Go! Team Remix)	2:29
4.	"Just" (The Loving Hand Remix)	6:11
5.	"Just" (DJ Premier's justremixitmix) (featuring Blaq Poet Instrumental)	3:55
6.	"Just" (The Loving Hand Remix Instrumental)	6:13

CD single

1. "Just" (radio edit)
2. "Valerie" (SugaRush Beat Company remix)

CD 1 88697271202 / download

1. "Just" (radio edit) – 3:51
2. "Valerie" (SugaRush Beat Company remix) – 3:45

CD 2 88697272032 / download

1. "Just" (radio edit) – 3:15
2. "Just" (DJ Premier's Justremixitmix) (featuring Blaq Poet) – 3:57
3. "Just" (The Go! Team remix) – 2:31
4. "Just" (The Loving Hand remix) – 6:12
5. "Just" (DJ Premier's Justremixitmix) (featuring Blaq Poet) (instrumental) – 3:57
6. "Just" (The Loving Hand remix) (instrumental) – 6:12

10" vinyl 88697271211

1. "Just" (radio edit)"
2. "Just" (DJ Premier's Justremixitmix) (featuring Blaq Poet)
3. "Just" (The Loving Hand remix)
4. "Just" (The Go! Team remix)

=== Charts ===
Chart (2008)	Peak position
Scottish Singles Sales (Official Charts)	23
UK Singles (Official Charts)	31
UK Dance (Official Charts)	3

=== Release history ===
Region	Date	Format(s)	Label(s)	Ref.
Various	13 March 2006	Digital download; streaming; CD single; Vinyl	RCA	
Various	15 February 2008	CD1; CD2; Vinyl; Digital download; streaming	RCA; Sony	

== Sources ==
- Randall, Mac (1 February 2012). Exit Music: The Radiohead Story Updated Edition. Backbeat Books. ISBN 978-1-4584-7147-5.
