= My Iron Lung =

EP by Radiohead
- Released: 26 September 1994
- Recorded: 1993–1994
- Studios: RAK, London
- Genres: Alternative rock; Britpop; post-punk; grunge
- Length: 28:23
- Labels: Parlophone; Capitol
- Producers: John Leckie; Nigel Godrich; Radiohead

Radiohead chronology
| Pablo Honey (1993) | My Iron Lung (1994) | The Bends (1995) |

Radiohead singles chronology
| "Stop Whispering" (1993) | "My Iron Lung" (1994) | "High and Dry / Planet Telex" (1995) |

Music video
- "My Iron Lung" on YouTube

My Iron Lung is the third EP by the English rock band Radiohead, released on 26 September 1994 by Parlophone Records in the UK and by Capitol Records in the US. It was produced by Radiohead, John Leckie and Nigel Godrich. It comprises the single "My Iron Lung" and various B-sides, recorded while Radiohead were working on their second album, The Bends, released the following year.

Radiohead wrote "My Iron Lung" in response to the success of their debut single, "Creep" (1992), which had both sustained and constrained them. Unsatisfied with the version recorded at RAK Studios, they used an edited performance recorded in May 1994 at the London Astoria.

My Iron Lung marked Radiohead's first collaborations with Godrich and the artist Stanley Donwood, who have worked on every Radiohead release since. The "My Iron Lung" single reached number 24 on the UK singles chart, and was included on The Bends. Critics likened its verse-chorus dynamic to the 1993 Nirvana song "Heart-Shaped Box". Retrospective reviews described it as a growth in Radiohead's songwriting.

== Recording ==
Radiohead recorded most of the songs on My Iron Lung at RAK Studios, London, during the sessions for their second album, The Bends (1995). The songwriter, Thom Yorke, said the EP was "just for fans", and described it as a collection of songs that did not fit the album rather than outtakes: "We think they're good, otherwise we wouldn't have plugged them on." The EP also includes an acoustic version of Radiohead's debut single, "Creep" (1992), from a performance on KROQ-FM on 13 July 1993. My Iron Lung was Radiohead's first collaboration with the producer Nigel Godrich, who was assisting the producer, John Leckie, at RAK as a tape engineer.

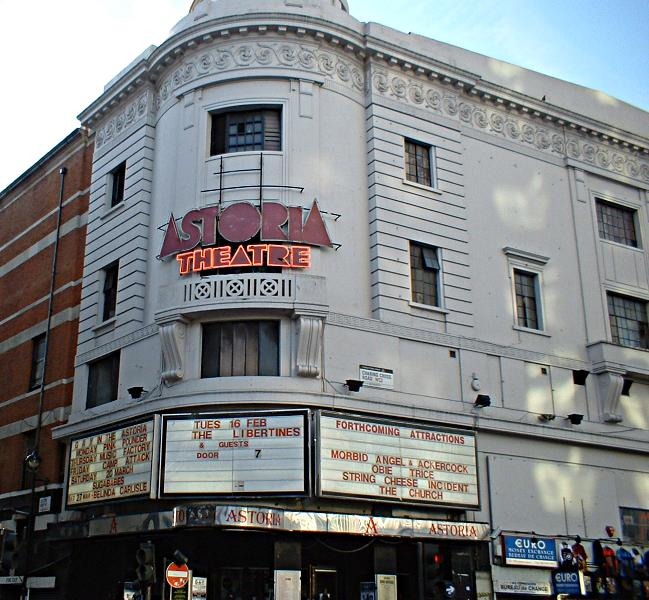
"My Iron Lung" was taken from a performance at the London Astoria (pictured).

Only "My Iron Lung" was included on The Bends. Radiohead wrote it in response to the request from their record label, EMI, to record a single to repeat the success of "Creep". The caustic lyrics use an iron lung as a metaphor for the way "Creep" had both sustained and constrained them: "This is our new song / Just like the last one / A total waste of time / My iron lung". Yorke said in 1995: "People have defined our emotional range with that one song, 'Creep'. I saw reviews of 'My Iron Lung' that said it was just like 'Creep'. When you're up against things like that, it's like: 'Fuck you.' These people are never going to listen."

According to the journalist Mac Randall, "My Iron Lung" transitions from a "jangly" opening hook to a "McCartney-esque verse melody" and "pulverising guitar explosions" in the bridge. Jonny Greenwood used a DigiTech Whammy pedal to pitch-shift his guitar by one octave, creating a "glitchy, lo-fi" sound. Ed O'Brien used an EBow, an electronic sustaining device, to generate a drone on his guitar.

Radiohead recorded versions of "My Iron Lung" at RAK, but were not satisfied with the results. Instead, they used a performance recorded in May 1994 at the London Astoria, with Yorke's vocals replaced and the audience removed. Leckie said: "Considering it was recorded in the back of a truck outside the hall – not the best sound to get something from – we did quite well." The Astoria performance was included in the video Live at the Astoria, released in March 1995.

== Artwork ==
My Iron Lung was Radiohead's first collaboration with the cover artist Stanley Donwood, whom Yorke enlisted as he was unhappy with their cover artwork. Donwood was not a fan of rock music, and said he took the work because he knew Yorke from their time as art students at the University of Exeter. Donwood and Godrich have worked on every Radiohead release since.

== Release ==
"My Iron Lung" was released as a single in the UK in September 26 in four versions, each with different track order. To encourage fans to buy multiple copies, EMI released two CD singles; one included the B-sides "The Trickster", "Punchdrunk Lovesick Singalong", and "Lozenge of Love", while the other included the B-sides "Lewis (Mistreated)", "Permanent Daylight", and "You Never Wash Up After Yourself". The My Iron Lung EP compiles "My Iron Lung" and all the B-sides.

The single reached number 24 on the UK singles chart. In the US, it topped the college radio charts, but sold only around 20,000 copies. Yorke and Greenwood expressed disappointment that Capitol, EMI's American subsidiary, had not promoted it more. The A&R vice president, Perry Watts-Russel, said Capitol had not pursued radio play as "My Iron Lung" was intended for fans rather than as the lead single for The Bends. Randall noted that, unlike the UK, the US was not a major market for singles, and that the sales instead indicated that Radiohead had built an audience there. He argued that "My Iron Lung" boosted Radiohead's artistic credibility, creating commercial opportunity for The Bends.

On 18 December 2007, "My Iron Lung" was released as downloadable content for the music game Rock Band. On 31 August, 2009, EMI reissued The Bends in a "Collector's Edition", including the My Iron Lung tracks. Radiohead had no input into the reissue and the music was not remastered. The EMI reissue was removed from streaming services after Radiohead's back catalogue was transferred to XL in 2016.

== Critical reception ==
Professional ratings
Review scores
| Source | Rating |
|---|---|
| AllMusic | 4/5 stars |
| Entertainment.ie | 4/5 stars |
| Music Week | 4/5 stars |
| Smash Hits | 4/5 stars |

"My Iron Lung" initially received mixed reviews. Critics likened its verse-chorus dynamic to the 1993 Nirvana song "Heart-Shaped Box". According to Randall, it puzzled fans and critics, defying expectations, but "makes much more sense" on The Bends.Music & Media wrote: "More psychedelic than before, but the 'two-headed' approach of a Nirvana-esque soft and a hard bit cycle within one song is a concept this lot already dealt with at the time of 'Creep'."

Larry Flick from Billboard wrote that "My Iron Lung" was "brilliant, mind-bending rock ... The sensitive intro is soon interrupted by a crash of loud and grating guitars, which rage in a seemingly random explosive roar." Leesa Daniels from Smash Hits gave it four out of five, calling it "magnificent" and "stupendous". In 2020, the Guardian named "My Iron Lung" the 10th-best Radiohead song, writing that it "uses catchy hooks and brawny riffs to rally against commercialisation. It risks sounding bratty – it is bratty – but from insolence [Radiohead] fashioned a new identity: stadium-rock agitators declaring war on hypocrisy and greed – particularly their own."

The AllMusic critic Greg Prato praised the My Iron Lung EP, writing: "Because of the tracks' consistency and sequencing, it plays like a real album rather than a collection of B-sides and outtakes thrown together haphazardly." He felt the acoustic version of "Creep", with a "surprisingly harsh and off-key middle section", was "the only weak spot". Entertainment.ie wrote: "While these off-cuts are inevitably more low-key and experimental than the classics we're all familiar with, the same spirit of anguish [of The Bends] and fragility is still thrillingly familiar." Randall felt Radiohead were right to omit the other Bends tracks from the EP, but felt they were building their own identity and identified a growing sophistication and diversity in their songwriting. He praised "The Trickster" and "Punchdrunk Lovesick Singalong" as the most developed songs, likening them to Sonic Youth. The Pitchfork critic Scott Plagenhoef wrote that on My Iron Lung Radiohead found "new ways to pick apart and re-construct the typical alt-rock template" and "demonstrated a band whose collective heads seemed to crack open and spill out new ideas".

== Track listing ==
All tracks are written by Radiohead.

| No. | Title | Length |
|---|---|---|
| 1. | "My Iron Lung" | 4:36 |
| 2. | "The Trickster" | 4:40 |
| 3. | "Lewis (Mistreated)" | 3:14 |
| 4. | "Punchdrunk Lovesick Singalong" | 4:40 |
| 5. | "Permanent Daylight" | 2:48 |
| 6. | "Lozenge of Love" | 2:16 |
| 7. | "You Never Wash Up After Yourself (live)" | 1:44 |
| 8. | "Creep" (Acoustic) | 4:19 |
| Total length: | | 28:23 |

== Personnel ==
Adapted from the liner notes.

Radiohead

- Thom Yorke
- Jonny Greenwood
- Ed O'Brien
- Colin Greenwood
- Philip Selway

Production

- John Leckie – production and engineering on tracks 1–4 and 6
- Nigel Godrich – engineering on tracks 1–4 and 6, production on track 5
- Chris Brown – engineering on tracks 1–4 and 6
- Guy Massey – assistance
- Shelly Saunders – assistance
- Jim Warren – mixing on track 5, recording on track 7

Artwork

- Stanley Donwood
- Thom Yorke

== Charts ==
=== Weekly charts ===
1994–1995 weekly chart performance for "My Iron Lung"
| Chart (1994–1995) | Peak position |
|---|---|
| Australia (ARIA) | 100 |
| UK Singles (Official Charts) | 24 |

2002 weekly chart performance for "My Iron Lung"
| Chart (2002) | Peak position |
|---|---|
| Canada (Nielsen SoundScan) | 5 |

=== Year-end charts ===
2001 year-end chart performance for "My Iron Lung"
| Chart (2001) | Position |
|---|---|
| Canada (Nielsen SoundScan) Import | 22 |
| Canada (Nielsen SoundScan) | 157 |

2002 year-end chart performance for "My Iron Lung"
| Chart (2002) | Position |
|---|---|
| Canada (Nielsen SoundScan) | 28 |

== Certifications ==
Certifications for My Iron Lung
| Region | Certification | Certified units/sales |
|---|---|---|
| Australia (ARIA) | Platinum | 70,000^{^} |
| United Kingdom (BPI) | Gold | 100,000^{^} |
^{^} Shipments figures based on certification alone.
