= USS City of Lewes =

Patrol vessel of the United States Navy

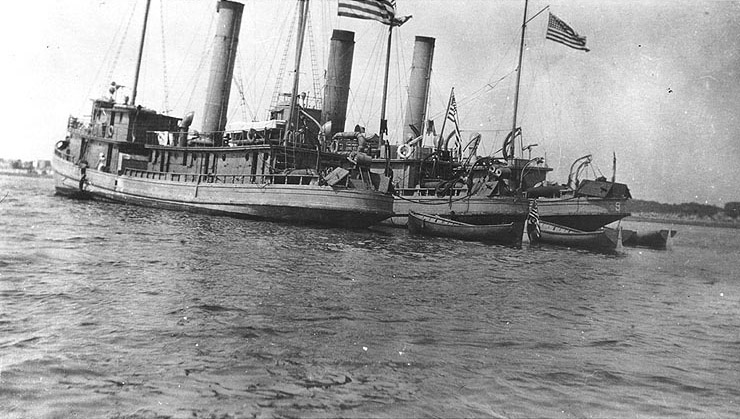
- The United States Navy minesweepers USS Anderton (SP-530), USS Lewes (SP-383), and USS James (SP-429) moored at L'Orient, France, in 1918. Anderton is at center; it is unknown which of the other two ships is Lewes and which is James.

History

United States
- Name: USS City of Lewes (1917); USS Lewes (1917-1919)
- Namesake: City of Lewes was her previous name retained; Lewes was a shortening of her name mandated by a July 1917 Department of the Navy general order
- Builder: W. G. Abbott, Milford, Delaware
- Completed: 1912
- Acquired: 18 May 1917 (officially purchased)
- Commissioned: 12 May 1918
- Decommissioned: 8 September 1919
- Fate: Sold
- Notes: Operated as commercial fishing boat City of Lewes 1912-1917

General characteristics
- Type: Minesweeper and patrol vessel
- Tonnage: 254 gross register tons
- Length: 150 ft (46 m)
- Beam: 24 ft (7.3 m)
- Draft: 9 ft (2.7 m)
- Speed: 12 knots
- Complement: 36

USS City of Lewes (SP-383), later USS Lewes (SP-383), was a minesweeper and patrol vessel that served in the United States Navy from 1917 to 1919.

City of Lewes was built as a commercial fishing boat of the same name in 1912 by W. G. Abbott at Milford, Delaware. In May 1917, the U.S. Navy purchased her for use on the section patrol as a minesweeper and patrol vessel during World War I. She was commissioned as USS City of Lewes (SP-383) on 12 May 1917, although her purchase apparently did not become official until 19 May 1917.

In accordance with a United States Department of the Navy general order that all section patrol craft should have their names shortened to surnames or single words (as applicable), City of Lewes was renamed USS Lewes (SP-383) in July 1917. However, she still often was called USS City of Lewes for the remainder of her Navy career.

After fitting out as a minesweeper, Lewes departed Philadelphia, Pennsylvania, on 14 August 1917 bound for Brest, France, which she reached on 18 September 1917. Following voyage repairs, she took up patrol and convoy escort duties, which she pursued for the remainder of World War I. She also engaged in minesweeping to keep shipping channels free of German naval mines, and she continued minesweeping work after the end of the war and into 1919.

Lewes was decommissioned at Brest on 8 September 1919 and sold abroad.
