= High and Dry / Planet Telex =

1995 single by Radiohead

"High and Dry" / "Planet Telex"
- CD1 single artwork

Single by Radiohead

from the album The Bends
- Released: 27 February 1995
- Recorded: 1993–1994
- Studio: RAK (London); Courtyard (Oxfordshire)
- Genre: "High and Dry": Post-Britpop; alternative rock; "Planet Telex": Shoegaze; experimental rock
- Length: 4:17 ("High and Dry"); 4:18 ("Planet Telex")
- Label: Parlophone; Capitol
- Songwriter: Radiohead
- Producers: Radiohead; John Leckie; Jim Warren

Radiohead singles chronology
"My Iron Lung" (1994)	"High and Dry" / "Planet Telex" (1995)	"Fake Plastic Trees" (1995)

Music video
- "High and Dry" (UK version) on YouTube "High and Dry" (US version) on YouTube

"High and Dry" and "Planet Telex" are songs by the English rock band Radiohead, released on their second album, The Bends (1995). They were released as a double A-side single on 27 February 1995 by Parlophone and Capitol Records.

"High and Dry" was recorded as a demo during the sessions for Radiohead's first album, Pablo Honey (1993), and remastered for The Bends. It is credited as an influence on the bands Travis and Coldplay. "Planet Telex" developed from studio experimentation with drum loops. Two music videos were produced for "High and Dry".

== Recording ==
Radiohead's songwriter, Thom Yorke, performed an early version of "High and Dry" with another band, Headless Chickens, while attending the University of Exeter in the late 1980s. He said the lyrics were about "some loony girl I was going out with", but became "mixed up with ideas about success and failure".

In 1993, Radiohead recorded a demo at Courtyard Studios, Oxfordshire, with their live engineer, Jim Warren. They dismissed it as "too Rod Stewart". However, the demo was rediscovered and remastered for inclusion on their second album, The Bends (1995). In 2006, Yorke said "High and Dry" was "very bad" and that Radiohead's record label at the time, EMI, had pressured him into releasing it.

Radiohead wrote and recorded "Planet Telex" in a single session at RAK Studios while working on The Bends. It developed from experiments with a drum loop taken from another song, the B-side "Killer Cars", to which Radiohead added piano processed with multiple delay effects. The band members had returned from a restaurant, and Yorke recorded his vocals drunk, slumped in a corner. According to the producer, John Leckie, "We had the whole thing down within a couple of hours, which was really refreshing and fun to do." The original title was "Planet Xerox", but Radiohead were denied permission to use the Xerox trademark.

== Music videos ==
The first music video for "High and Dry" was directed by David Mould and features Radiohead performing at the Vasquez Rocks outside Los Angeles. For the American market, Radiohead's American record label, Capitol, commissioned a new video set in a roadside diner, inspired by the 1994 film Pulp Fiction. It was directed by Paul Cunningham. At the request of MTV, the video was edited to remove a shot of an exploding car.

== Critical reception ==
Pete Stanton from Smash Hits gave "High and Dry" four out of five, writing: "It has a Suede-ish vibe to it, minus the whining, and is a mellow-but-not-boring track." In 2017, Pitchfork said "High and Dry" and another Bends song, "Fake Plastic Trees", anticipated the "airbrushed" post-Britpop of Coldplay and Travis. The Irish Times said that "High and Dry" had "essentially invented Coldplay".

== Track listing ==
CD1
No.	Title	Length
1.	"High and Dry"	4:17
2.	"Planet Telex"	4:18
3.	"Maquiladora"	3:27
4.	"Planet Telex" (Hexidecimal Mix)	6:44
Total length:		18:46

CD2
No.	Title	Length
1.	"Planet Telex"	4:18
2.	"High and Dry"	4:17
3.	"Killer Cars"	3:02
4.	"Planet Telex" (L.F.O. JD Mix)	4:40
Total length:		16:17

12" vinyl
No.	Title	Length
1.	"Planet Telex" (Hexidecimal Mix)	6:44
2.	"Planet Telex" (L.F.O. JD Mix)	4:40
3.	"Planet Telex" (Hexidecimal Dub)	7:32
4.	"High and Dry"	4:17
Total length:		22:14

Planet Telex Promotional 12" vinyl
No.	Title	Length
1.	"Planet Telex" (Album Version)	4:19
2.	"Planet Telex" (Hexidecimal Mix)	6:44
3.	"Planet Telex" (L.F.O. JD Mix)	4:40
4.	"Planet Telex" (Trashed Mix)	4:25
Total length:		20:08

1996 US release
No.	Title	Length
1.	"High and Dry"	4:16
2.	"India Rubber"	3:26
3.	"Maquiladora"	3:26
4.	"How Can You Be Sure?"	4:21
5.	"Just" (live at the Forum)	3:47
Total length:		19:12

== Personnel ==
Radiohead

- Colin Greenwood
- Jonny Greenwood
- Ed O'Brien
- Philip Selway
- Thom Yorke

Production

- John Leckie – production (except "High and Dry"), mixing ("Maquiladora")
- Nigel Godrich – engineering (except "High and Dry")
- Steve Osborne – remixing ("Planet Telex (Hexidecimal Mix)")
- Chris Brown – engineering ("Maquiladora")
- Sean Slade and Paul Q. Kolderie – mixing ("Planet Telex", "High and Dry", "Killer Cars")

Artwork

- Stanley Donwood
- Thom Yorke

== Charts ==
=== Weekly charts ===
Chart (1995–1996)	Peak position
Australia (ARIA)	62
Canada Top Singles (RPM)	31
Canada Rock/Alternative (RPM)	11
Europe (Eurochart Hot 100)	70
Europe (European Hit Radio)	25
Iceland (Íslenski Listinn Topp 40)	15
Israel (IBA)	18
Italy Airplay (Music & Media)	6
New Zealand (Recorded Music NZ)	22
Scottish Singles Sales (Official Charts) with "Planet Telex"	21
UK Singles (Official Charts) with "Planet Telex"	17
US Billboard Hot 100	78
US Alternative Airplay (Billboard)	18

=== Year-end charts ===
Chart (1996)	Position
US Modern Rock Tracks (Billboard)	84

Chart (2001)	Position
Canada (Nielsen SoundScan)	120

== Certifications ==
Region	Certification	Certified units/sales
Canada (Music Canada)	2× Platinum	160,000^{‡}
Italy (FIMI) sales since 2009	Gold	35,000^{‡}
New Zealand (RMNZ)	2× Platinum	60,000^{‡}
Spain (Promusicae)	Gold	30,000^{‡}
United Kingdom (BPI)	Platinum	600,000^{‡}
^{‡} Sales+streaming figures based on certification alone.
