= Street Spirit (Fade Out) =

1996 single by Radiohead

Single by Radiohead

from the album The Bends
- B-side: "Talk Show Host"; "Bishop's Robes"
- Released: 22 January 1996
- Recorded: 1994
- Genre: Post-grunge; psychedelia
- Length: 4:13
- Label: Parlophone
- Songwriter: Radiohead
- Producer: John Leckie

Radiohead singles chronology
"Just" (1995)	"Street Spirit (Fade Out)" (1996)	"The Bends" (1996)

Music video
- "Street Spirit (Fade Out)" on YouTube

"Street Spirit (Fade Out)" is a song by the English rock band Radiohead, released as the fifth single from their second album, The Bends (1995), on 22 January 1996. Radiohead considered it a breakthrough in their songwriting. It was accompanied by a music video by Jonathan Glazer.

"Street Spirit" reached number five on the UK singles chart, Radiohead's highest position up to that point. The success demonstrated that Radiohead were not one-hit wonders after their previous singles had failed to match the success of their 1992 debut, "Creep". It has been covered by acts including Peter Gabriel and the Darkness.

== Composition ==
"Street Spirit" is the final track on The Bends. Radiohead's songwriter, Thom Yorke, said "Street Spirit" was inspired by the American band R.E.M. and the 1991 novel The Famished Road by Ben Okri. It features a guitar arpeggio written by Yorke and played by Ed O'Brien. The lead guitarist, Jonny Greenwood, plays a harmony over the arpeggio.

The journalist Mac Randall wrote while it could not be called optimistic, "Street Spirit" contained notes of optimism, and that its closing line, "Immerse your soul in love", was the most positive lyric on The Bends. In 2018, Pitchfork wrote that it "channels a sense of capitalist dread that even class-conscious Britpop artists repressed".

== Recording ==
Radiohead recorded several versions of "Street Spirit" before settling on the final version. The members felt it was a breakthrough in their songwriting. Yorke said later: "If I ever forget why I started this as a career, then ['Street Spirit'] is why I started ... We spent a day going round in circles until I was thinking, 'This is never going to happen.' Then suddenly something happened and I was transported to a place that I'd been willing myself to be in for months on end."

== Music video ==
Yorke approached Jonathan Glazer to direct the video, as he had been impressed by his video for "Karmacoma" (1995) by Massive Attack. Glazer filmed in black and white over two nights in a desert outside Los Angeles. He used a technique he had seen in nature documentaries, shooting using high-speed cameras and removing frames to slow it down. The record company, Parlophone, paid for Glazer to go to Germany to capture additional footage of Yorke.

Glazer described "Street Spirit" as a "turning point" for his work. He felt that Radiohead had "found their own voices as an artist" and that "I got close to whatever mine was, and I felt confident that I could do things that emoted, that had some kind of poetic as well as prosaic value".

== Release ==
"Street Spirit" was released as the fifth and final single from Radiohead's second album, The Bends (1995), on 22 January 1996. It reached number five on the UK singles chart, Radiohead’s highest position up to that point. After Radiohead's previous singles had failed to match the success of their 1992 debut, "Creep", "Street Spirit" demonstrated that they were not one-hit wonders. In 2008, "Street Spirit" was included on Radiohead: The Best Of.

== Reception ==
In 2012, the Pitchfork critic Stuart Berman described "Street Spirit" as a "crucial, transitory track" that bridged the "futuristic Britpop" of The Bends and Radiohead's next album, the "dystopian" OK Computer (1997). The journalist Mac Randall wrote that Greenwood's guitar harmony was "one of the tastiest guitar parts on an album loaded with delectable six-string moments".

In 2015, Stereogum said "Street Spirit" was "one of the all-time great album closers ... a perfectly rendered slice of doomy, incantatory psychedelia that made it sound like Radiohead could do anything". In 2020, the Guardian named it the 12th-greatest Radiohead song, writing that it "makes for a spectacular showdown – a grand, doomed surrender".

== Covers ==
Peter Gabriel recorded a slower, orchestral cover of "Street Spirit" for his album Scratch My Back (2010). He described his version as an "existential cry of mortality". He hoped that, in return, Radiohead would record a version of his 1982 song "Wallflower" for his album And I'll Scratch Yours (2013). According to Gabriel, Radiohead ceased communication after he sent them his version of "Street Spirit". He said his rendition was "pretty extreme" and that he later heard that Radiohead did not like it.

The Darkness performed "Street Spirit" in their 2003 live shows and recorded it for their 2012 album Hot Cakes. Their version is arranged in the style of 1980s hair metal, with speed-metal verses and half-time grunge choruses. It includes a quote of another Bends song, "Just". In Pitchfork, Stuart Berman wrote that it translates "the original's dreamy intensity into a battlefield-conquering rallying cry". The Guardian critic Steven Poole wrote that the Darkness "reinvent it brilliantly". In 2020, the System of a Down drummer John Dolmayan released a cover of "Street Spirit" with M. Shadows of Avenged Sevenfold and Tom Morello of Rage Against the Machine on his album These Grey Men.

== Track listing ==
=== CD 1 ===
1. "Street Spirit (Fade Out)" – 4:13
2. "Talk Show Host" – 4:41
3. "Bishop's Robes" – 3:25

=== CD 2 ===
1. "Street Spirit (Fade Out)" – 4:13
2. "Banana Co." – 2:20
3. "Molasses" – 2:27

== Personnel ==
All personnel adapted from the liner notes.

Radiohead

- Thom Yorke
- Jonny Greenwood
- Ed O'Brien
- Colin Greenwood
- Philip Selway

Production

- John Leckie – production "(Street Spirit", "Banana Co."), mixing "(Street Spirit"), engineering "(Street Spirit")
- Nigel Godrich – production ("Talk Show Host", "Bishop's Robes", "Molasses"), engineering ("Street Spirit"), mixing ("Talk Show Host", "Molasses")
- Chris Brown – engineering
- Chris Blair – mastering
- Jim Warren – initial production ("Banana Co.")
- Sean Slade – mixing ("Banana Co.")
- Paul Q. Kolderie – mixing ("Banana Co.")

Design

- Stanley Donwood – art
- The White Chocolate Farm – art

== Charts ==
Chart (1996)	Peak position
Canada Top Singles (RPM)	57
Europe (Eurochart Hot 100)	19
Iceland (Íslenski Listinn Topp 40)	21
Ireland (IRMA)	25
Israel (IBA)	6
Netherlands (Dutch Top 40)	28
Netherlands (Single Top 100)	26
Scottish Singles Sales (Official Charts)	7
UK Singles (Official Charts)	5

=== Year-end charts ===
Chart (2001)	Position
Canada (Nielsen SoundScan)	105

== Certifications ==
Region	Certification	Certified units/sales
New Zealand (RMNZ)	Gold	15,000^{‡}
United Kingdom (BPI)	Silver	200,000^{‡}
^{‡} Sales+streaming figures based on certification alone.
