= Stanley Donwood =

English artist (born 1968)

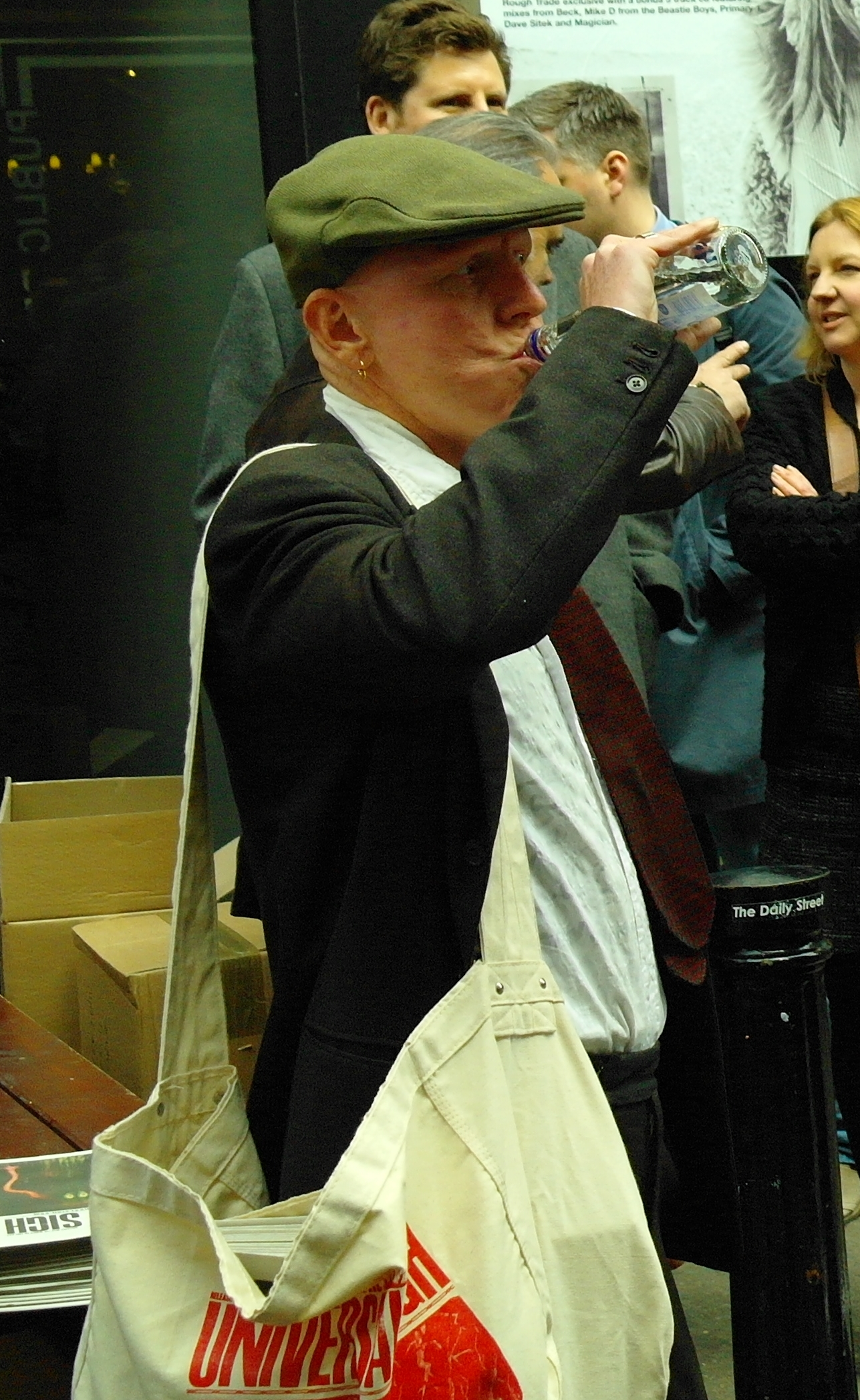
- Stanley Donwood in 2011
- Born: Daniel Ralph Rickwood; 29 October 1968 (age 57); Essex, England
- Education: University of Exeter
- Known for: Painting; Graphic design; Drawing
- Patrons: Radiohead; Thom Yorke; Atoms for Peace; Jonny Greenwood
- Website: slowlydownward.com

Dan Rickwood (born 29 October 1968), known professionally as Stanley Donwood, is an English artist and writer. Since 1994, he has created all the artwork for the rock band Radiohead with their singer, Thom Yorke. He also creates art for many of Yorke's other projects, including Atoms for Peace and the Smile. In 2002, Donwood and Yorke won a Grammy Award for Best Recording Package for the Radiohead album Amnesiac. Donwood also creates artwork for Glastonbury Festival and has collaborated on several works with the nature writer Robert Macfarlane. He has published books of short stories and a memoir.

== Career ==
Rickwood uses the pen name Stanley Donwood. He said: "I like to separate the person I am at home — washing up, vacuuming, picking up the kids from school and so on — from whoever Stanley Donwood is." He described record shops, with their shelves of album covers, as his introduction to art.

=== Radiohead ===
Donwood and the Radiohead singer, Thom Yorke, met as art students at the University of Exeter. Donwood said his first impressions of Yorke were that he was "Mouthy. Pissed off. Someone I could work with." Yorke wrote: "I met him first day at art college ... I figured I'd either end up really not liking this person at all, or working with him for the rest of my life." After university, Donwood traveled the country busking as a fire breather.

Radiohead released their first album, Pablo Honey, in 1993. Unhappy with the cover art, Yorke asked Donwood to help produce the art for their next release, the 1994 EP My Iron Lung. Donwood was not a fan of rock music, and said he took the work because he knew Yorke. He said in 2015: "[Radiohead] wasn't my cup of tea at all. Now they have seen sense and are a lot more electro. I like their stuff now." Donwood has worked with Yorke to create artwork for all of Radiohead's releases and promotional material since. He works alongside Radiohead, allowing the music to influence the artwork.

Whereas Donwood described himself as having a tendency towards "detailing and perfectionism", he said Yorke is "completely opposed, fucking everything up ... I do something, then he fucks it up, then I fuck up what he's done ... and we keep doing that until we're happy with the result. It's a competition to see who 'wins' the painting, which one of us takes possession of it in an artistic way." In 2025, the Guardian wrote that Donwood and Yorke had "created some of the most recognisable, ubiquitous and maybe even iconic album covers of their generation".

In 2002, Donwood and Yorke won a Grammy Award for Best Recording Package for the special edition for the album Amnesiac. Donwood contributed to Kid A Mnesia Exhibition, a 2021 interactive experience with music and artwork from Kid A (2000) and Amnesiac (2001). He also creates artwork for Yorke's solo records and Yorke's bands Atoms for Peace and the Smile.

=== Exhibitions ===
In 2006, Donwood's exhibition London Views consisted of a series of 14 lino prints of various London landmarks being destroyed by fire and flood. The prints were exhibited at the Lazarides Gallery in London. One of the prints was used as the cover art for Yorke's first solo album, The Eraser (2006).

In November 2006, Donwood exhibited the original paintings and other artwork created by him and Yorke for Radiohead albums at Iguapop Gallery in Barcelona. In May 2015, Donwood opened an exhibition of Radiohead artwork, The Panic Office, in Sydney, Australia, for which Yorke composed an original soundtrack. In 2021, Donwood designed a Radiohead-themed Brompton bicycle to be auctioned for the charity Crew Nation.

In October 2021, Donwood and Yorke curated an exhibition of Radiohead artwork at Christie's headquarters in London. Donwood auctioned paintings and other artwork he created for Kid A. In September 2023, Donwood and Yorke exhibited a selection of artwork, The Crow Flies, in London. The paintings, based on Islamic pirate maps and 1960s US military topographic charts, began as work for the Smile's first album, A Light For Attracting Attention (2022).

This Is What You Get, an exhibition of Yorke and Donwood's Radiohead, opened in August 2025 at the Ashmolean Museum in Oxford. The Guardian gave the exhibition two out of five, writing that the work did not "stand up to scrutiny when removed from the context of the records and merchandise it was designed for ... from an art perspective it is a succession of bad paintings". However, the Times argued that the artwork stood alone. The Independent wrote: "Donwood's canvases here are celebratory and bright, as fast and fluid-seeming as the way in which the music itself was created. Art snobs beware, for this is a marvellously accessible exhibition from one of Britain's most enigmatic bands." In May 2026, Donwood and Yorke's first overseas exhibition, "No Go Elevator (Not Without No Keycard)", opened in Venice, depicting "unnerving, isolated terrains".

=== Writing ===
Donwood has published three collections of short stories: Slowly Downward: A Collection of Miserable Stories (2001), Household Worms (2011) and Bad Island (2020). He contributed stories to The Universal Sigh, a free single-issue newspaper created to promote Radiohead's 2011 album The King of Limbs. In 2019, he published a memoir about his work, There Will Be No Quiet.

=== Six Inch Records ===
In late 2006, Donwood and Richard Lawrence launched an independent record company, Six Inch Records. The label released three albums, with 333 copies of each. The CDs were packaged by hand into sleeves that were six inches square. All mechanised operations – printing, cutting and scoring – were carried out using a 1965 Heidelberg platen press. On 18 February 2009, Donwood announced that Six Inch Records had closed.

=== Other work ===
In 2006, Donwood began creating and selling large screen prints. In an interview with AllMusic, he explained it as an effort to reconnect with the process of print making and as a means to share his art in a larger format than the small, low-quality prints in album cover and insert art, "It's a way of getting pictures out in the way they should be seen; not as 4-colour litho on cheap paper, but as real pieces of artwork that have a much greater visual impact." Donwood creates artwork for Glastonbury Festival.

Donwood has created book covers for the nature writer Robert Macfarlane. He illustrated Macfarlane's 2019 book Ness, a prose poem. In 2021, he collaborated with Macfarlane on an edition of Thomas Hardy poems published by the Folio Society. Donwood provided the illustrations for the poems selected and introduced by Macfarlane. Donwood's illustrations were exhibited at the Jealous Gallery in London in 2021 and the Fine Foundation Gallery at Durlston Castle in Durlston Country Park in 2021.

== Bibliography ==
- (1998) Small Thoughts – printed on eleven circular cards, housed in a tin
- (2001) Slowly Downward: A Collection of Miserable Stories (ISBN 978-0954417734)
- (2002) Catacombs of Terror! (ISBN 9781507204900)
- (2003) Tachistoscope
- (2007) Dead Children Playing – with Thom Yorke (ISBN 978-1844671700)
- (2011) Household Worms (ISBN 978-1906477554)
- (2012) Holloway – with Robert Macfarlane and Dan Richards
- (2014) Humor (ISBN 978-0571312436)
- (2019) Stanley Donwood: There Will Be No Quiet (ISBN 978-0500-02298-6)
- (2019) Ness – with Robert Macfarlane
- (2020) Bad Island
- (2021) Fear Stalks the Land! — with Thom Yorke (ISBN 978-1-83885-736-3)
- (2021) Kid A Mnesia Art Catalogue — with Thom Yorke (ISBN 978-1-83885-737-0)
