= Phantom Planet discography =

Discography of American rock band Phantom Planet

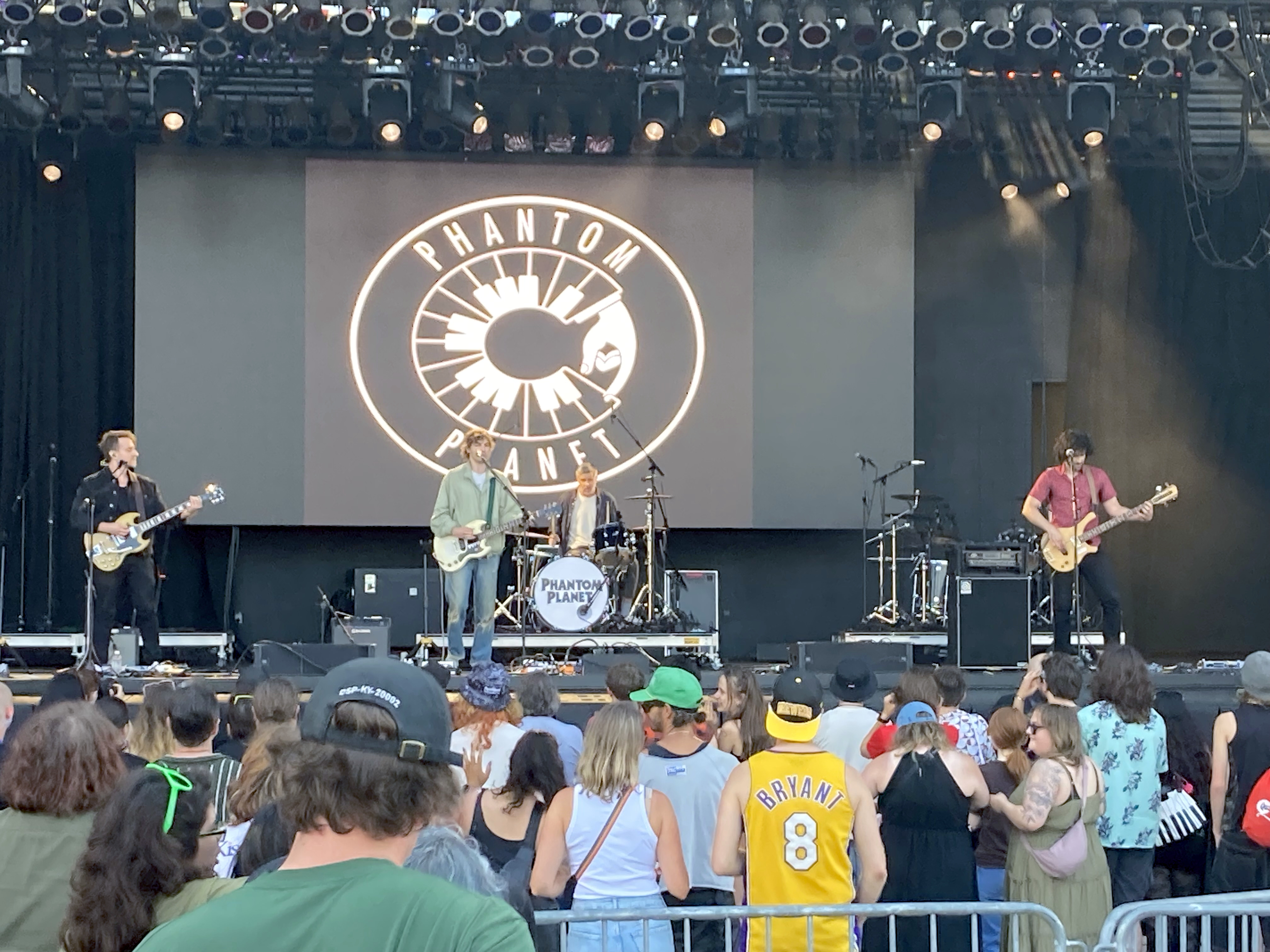
- Phantom Planet performing at Summerfest 2025. From left to right: Lead guitarist Darren Robinson, frontman/rhythm guitarist Alex Greenwald, drummer Andrew Parker, and substitute bassist Chris Lorentz.
- Studio albums: 5
- Extended plays: 4
- Live albums: 1
- Singles: 24
- Music videos: 6
- Remix albums: 1

American alternative rock band Phantom Planet has released five studio albums, three extended plays (EPs), one remix album, twenty-four singles, six music videos, and two live DVDs. Since 2024, The band has consisted of vocalist-rhythm guitarist Alex Greenwald, lead guitarist Darren Robinson, bassist Sam Farrar and drummer Andrew Parker. The band is best known for its track "California", which became the theme song for the Fox TV series, The O.C.. As of 2026, the band is working on their sixth studio album.

== Albums ==
=== Studio albums ===
Title	Details	Peak chart positions			
Title	Details	US	AUS	AUS Hit.	AUT
Phantom Planet Is Missing	Released: July 28, 1998; Label: Geffen	—	—	—	—
The Guest	Released: February 26, 2002; Label: Epic	113	133	7	42
Phantom Planet	Released: January 6, 2004; Label: Epic	95	122	12 (Note: Phantom Planet charted as a double album with The Guest in Australia.)	—
Raise the Dead	Released: April 15, 2008; Label: Fueled by Ramen	119	—	—	—
Devastator	Released: June 18, 2020; Label: Gong	—	—	—	—
"—" denotes a recording that did not chart or was not released in that territory.

=== Live albums ===
Title	Details
Live at The Troubadour	Released: November 4, 2003; Label: Sony BMG
Bootleg! Live 2004	Released: September 7, 2004; Label: Sony BMG

=== Compilation albums ===
Title	Details
Polaroid	Released: 1999; Label: Phantom Planet Family
Negatives	Released: November 16, 2004 (digital release April 4, 2006); Label: Sony BMG
Negatives 2	Released: May 9, 2006; Label: Sony BMG

=== Re-recorded albums ===
Title	Details
The Guest Revisited	Released: May 17, 2023; Label: Gong

=== Remix albums ===
Title	Details
Devastator (Remixes, Pt. 1)	Released: August 21, 2020; Label: Gong

== Extended plays ==
Title	Details
California EP	Released: August 26, 2002; Label: Epic
Connect Sets	Released: October 26, 2004; Label: Epic
Do the Panic EP	Released: March 10, 2008; Label: Fueled by Ramen
Phantom Planet EP	Released: January 29, 2008; Label: Fueled by Ramen
Maybe You Still Call it Christmas	Released: November 29, 2024; Label: Gong

== Singles ==
=== As lead artist ===
Title	Year	Peak chart positions										Certifications	Album
Title	Year	US Alt.	AUS	AUT	EU	GER	IRL	ITA	SCO	SWI	UK	Certifications	Album
"So I Fall Again"	1998	—	—	—	—	—	—	—	—	—	—		Phantom Planet Is Missing and Sabrina the Teenage Witch: The Album
"The Local Black and Red"	1998	—	—	—	—	—	—	—	—	—	—		Phantom Planet Is Missing
"Hey Now Girl"	2001	—	—	—	—	—	—	—	—	—	—		The Guest
"California"	2002	35	115	3	21	13	12	2	7	17	9	RIAA: Gold; BPI: Gold	The Guest
"Lonely Day"	2002	—	119	—	—	—	—	—	—	—	—		The Guest
"Big Brat"	2003	20	—	—	—	—	—	—	—	—	—		Phantom Planet
"Galleria"	2004	—	—	—	—	—	—	—	—	—	—		Negatives
"Waiting Room"	2004	—	—	—	—	—	—	—	—	—	—		Non-album singles
"Our House"	2005	—	—	—	—	—	—	—	—	—	—		Non-album singles
"Do the Panic"	2008	—	—	—	—	—	—	—	—	—	—		Raise the Dead
"Dropped"	2008	—	—	—	—	—	—	—	—	—	—		Raise the Dead
"Ivory Daggers"	2008	—	—	—	—	—	—	—	—	—	—		Non-album single
"Balisong"	2019	—	—	—	—	—	—	—	—	—	—		Devastator
"Party Animal"	2019	—	—	—	—	—	—	—	—	—	—		Devastator
"Time Moves On"	2020	—	—	—	—	—	—	—	—	—	—		Devastator
"Only One"	2020	—	—	—	—	—	—	—	—	—	—		Devastator
"California" (re-recording)	2023	—	—	—	—	—	—	—	—	—	—		Non-album single
"Maybe You Still Call it Christmas"	2023	—	—	—	—	—	—	—	—	—	—		Maybe You Still Call it Christmas
"Drive On"	2024	—	—	—	—	—	—	—	—	—	—		TBA
"Riding the Wave"	2024	—	—	—	—	—	—	—	—	—	—		TBA
"Maybe You Still Call it Christmas" (Remix) (featuring Sarah McLachlan)	2024	—	—	—	—	—	—	—	—	—	—		Maybe You Still Call it Christmas
"Catch My Disease 2025" (with Ben Lee)	2025	—	—	—	—	—	—	—	—	—	—		TBA
"Friction"	2025	—	—	—	—	—	—	—	—	—	—		TBA
"Yesterday's Dead"	2026	—	—	—	—	—	—	—	—	—	—		TBA
"Never Apart"	2026	—	—	—	—	—	—	—	—	—	—		TBA
"—" denotes a recording that did not chart or was not released in that territory.

=== As featured artist ===
Title	Year	Peak chart positions			Album
Title	Year	SCO	UK	UK Dance	Album
"Just" (Mark Ronson featuring Phantom Planet)	2008	23	31	3	Version

== Other appearances ==
- "The Living Dead" was originally recorded for the soundtrack released in support of video game Stubbs the Zombie in 2005. It was later released as a Japanese bonus track for Phantom Planet.

== DVDs ==
''Phantom Planet: Live at the Troubadour''

- Released: 2003
- Label: Daylight/Epic
- Producer: Phantom Planet

''Phantom Planet: Chicago, Chicagogoing, Chicagogone''

- Released: December 2004
- Label: Epic Records
- Producer: Phantom Planet
