= Negatives 2 =

Compilation album by Phantom Planet
- Released: May 9, 2006
- Recorded: 2002–2004
- Genre: Alternative rock, garage rock revival
- Length: 56:33
- Label: Phantom Planet Family
- Producer: Various

Phantom Planet chronology
Negatives (2004)	Negatives 2 (2006)	Phantom Planet EP (2007)

Negatives 2 is Phantom Planet's second collection of rare demos and tracks, released on their official bootleg site in 2004, after initially being released to fanclub members only.

== Track listing ==
All tracks are written by Alex Greenwald, except where noted.

No.	Title	Writer(s)	Length
1.	"After Hours" (Home Demo)		2:43
2.	"Black Belt"		2:09
3.	"The Guest" (Demo)		3:42
4.	"I Got Love"	Greenwald, Jason Schwartzman	2:33
5.	"Clockwork"		4:30
6.	"God Must Have Put Your Heart in Wrong"		1:01
7.	"It's Over"		1:25
8.	"Alpine Romance" (Instrumental)		0:59
9.	"Submarine Song" (Instrumental)	Greenwald, Schwartzman	4:25
10.	"Leave Me Alone"		3:57
11.	"Come Back to Your Tomb"		0:43
12.	"See You Next Summer"		5:20
13.	"For Now Goodbye"	Greenwald, Schwartzman	3:09
14.	"March of the Spiders" (Instrumental)		1:38
15.	"Hollywood Is Waiting to Explode"		3:12
16.	"Outta Site"		2:30
17.	"Same to You"	Greenwald, Schwartzman	2:39
18.	"The Stalker"	Greenwald, Schwartzman	2:43
19.	"Mega Bros Theme Song"	Greenwald, Schwartzman	2:58
20.	"Best Band"		0:19
21.	"The Snake"		0:18
22.	"I Think I Can" (Instrumental)		2:57
Total length:			56:33

=== Notes ===
- The home demo of “After Hours” was initially mislabeled as “Jabberjaw” on the band’s website.
- “The Guest” (demo) is also featured on most reissues of the band’s second album, The Guest.
