= Phantom Planet (disambiguation) =

Phantom Planet may refer to:

- Phantom Planet, an American rock band
  - Phantom Planet (album), the band's third album, released in 2004
- The Phantom Planet, a 1961 science fiction film
- "Phantom Planet", the series finale of the Nickelodeon animated television series Danny Phantom
