= Alex Greenwald =

American musician and actor (born 1979)

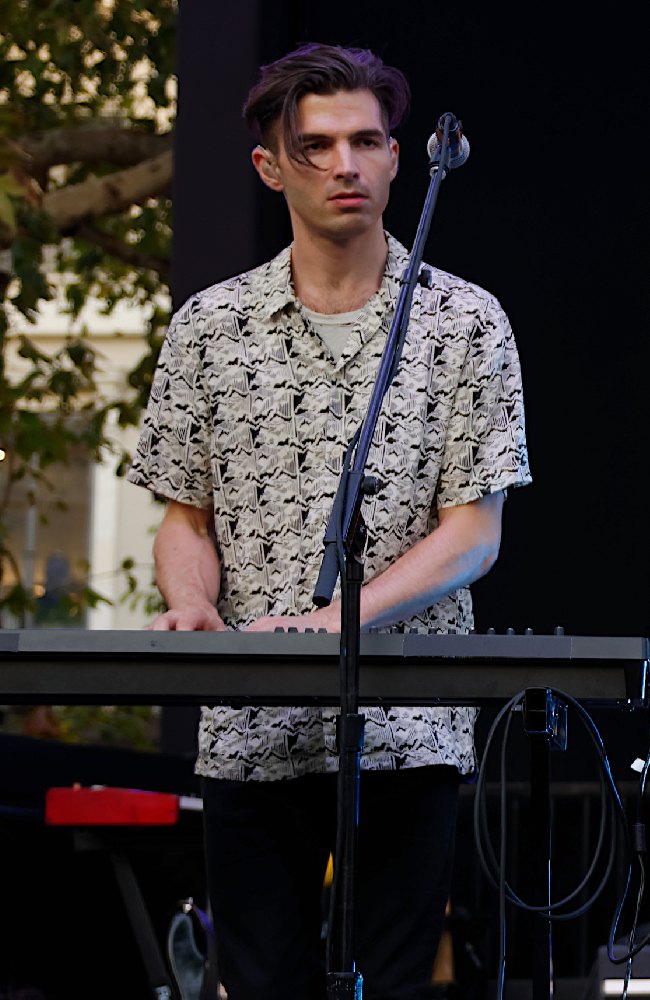
- Greenwald performing with Phases in July 2016
- Born: Alexander Greenwald; October 9, 1979 (age 46); Los Angeles, California, U.S.
- Occupations: Singer, musician, songwriter, producer, actor
- Years active: 1993–present
- Partner(s): Brie Larson (2013–2019); Phoebe Tonkin (2019–2020)
- Musical career
- Also known as: Clark Schädelkopf
- Genres: Alternative rock; pop rock; pop; indie rock; rock; indie pop
- Instruments: Vocals; guitar; keyboards; mandolin; bass; programming; drums; percussion
- Years active: 1994–present
- Labels: Geffen; Epic; Fueled by Ramen; Gong
- Member of: Phantom Planet
- Formerly of: Phases; Blackblack; Mark Ronson & The Business Intl.

Alexander Greenwald (born October 9, 1979) is an American musician and actor. Prior to his music career, he began his professional career as a teen actor with both live-action and animated roles in films like The Halloween Tree (1993) and No Dessert, Dad, till You Mow the Lawn (1994), before primarily transitioning to a music career shortly after, and has been the frontman and rhythm guitarist of the California rock band Phantom Planet since their inception in 1994. Greenwald has also been a member of Blackblack (under the moniker Clark Schädelkopf) and the indie pop supergroup Phases and is a frequent collaborator of the British musician, DJ and producer Mark Ronson. Greenwald released a solo album, Yo, in 2014 and played a minor role in then-fianceé Brie Larson's 2017 film Unicorn Store.

== Life and career ==
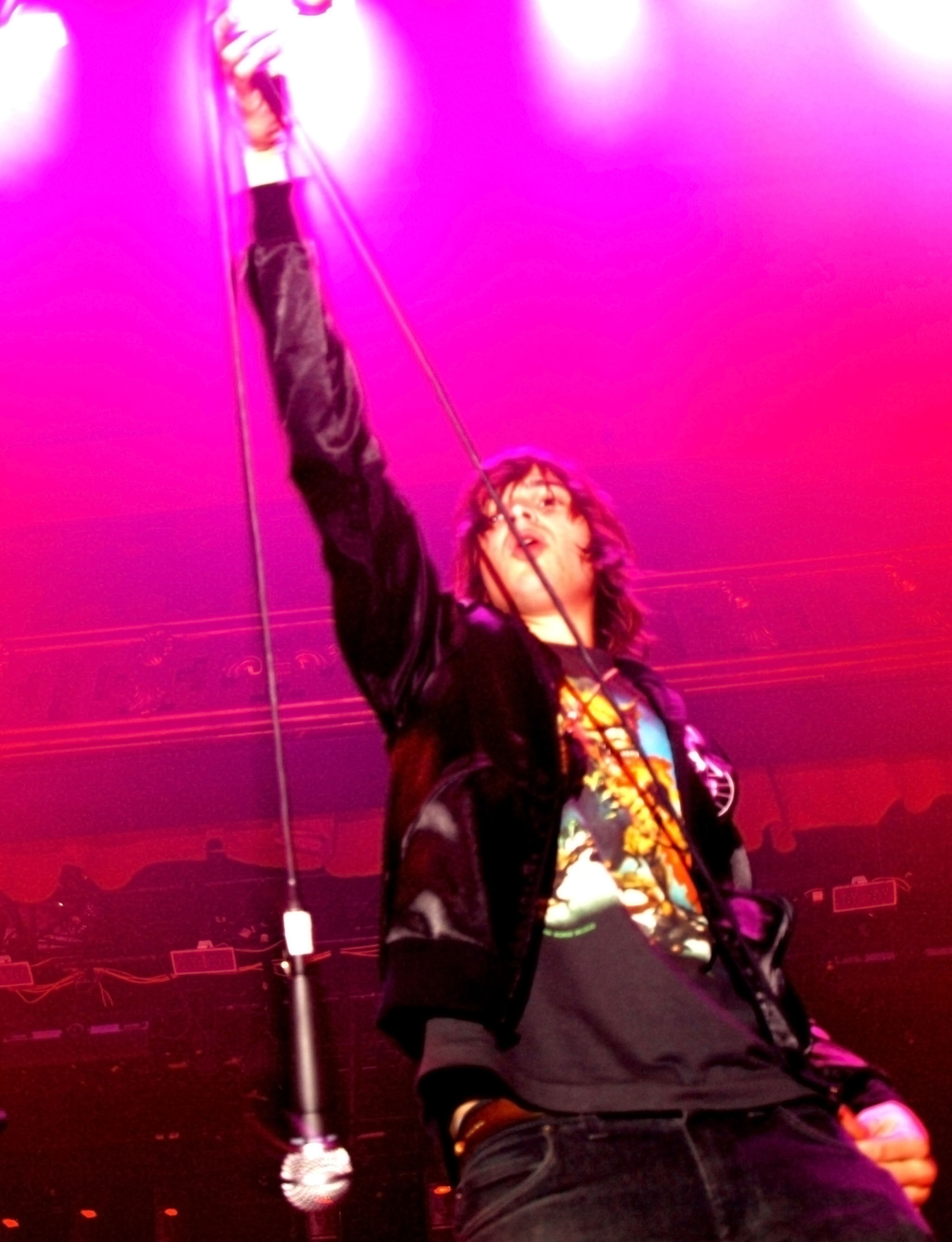
Greenwald performing with Phantom Planet in October 2008

In 1994, Greenwald formed Phantom Planet (named after the 1961 B-movie The Phantom Planet) in his teens at a Los Angeles Pizza Hut with four friends – guitarist Darren Robinson, bassist Sam Farrar (who is the son of Australian musicians John Farrar and Pat Carroll), guitarist Jacques Brautbar, and drummer Jason Schwartzman, who is a member of the Coppola family. The band is best known for producing the song "California", which was used as the theme song of the teen drama The O.C., which lasted four seasons. Phantom Planet went on hiatus in 2008, which was followed by a series of one-off reunions from 2011 to 2013, before permanently reuniting in 2019. The band released their comeback album, Devastator, through Greenwald's self-made label, Gong Records, in 2020.

In 2006, he and Phantom Planet bandmate Sam Farrar collaborated with the British DJ and record producer Mark Ronson, to cover the Radiohead song, "Just". The cover appears on the Radiohead tribute album Exit Music: Songs with Radio Heads (where he is solely credited as the featured performer), and was later re-issued on Ronson's album of cover versions, Version, now crediting Phantom Planet themselves as the featured artists. He appeared with Ronson at the 2007 Glastonbury Festival where he climbed up on to the lighting rig of the John Peel stage during the performance of "Just", and also sang "California". In 2010, he collaborated once again with Ronson on the album "Record Collection", on which Greenwald shares writing credits on six out of the eleven tracks. He became part of Ronson's band, The Business Intl. for this record. He was also a member of Los Angeles band Blackblack, under the moniker Clark Schädelkopf, until 2007. At live shows, he was known for 1980s-style dance moves, which were inspired from watching David Byrne of Talking Heads.

Greenwald is a vegan and has appeared in at least two ads for PETA. He told PETA his reasons for going vegan: "In college I stopped eating red meat on a bet with my girlfriend at the time. She bet she could stop smoking, and I bet that I could stop eating red meat. She started smoking again, so I won, which I'm always proud of.…I had been a vegetarian as a child for whatever reason. I guess kids sometimes follow their instincts…My friend dared me to go vegan as I was reading this book Fast Food Nation, which opened my eyes to a lot of cruelties.…Ever since then, I've been vegan and enjoyed it daily."

Greenwald co-produced and appeared on ex – Panic! at the Disco members Ryan Ross and Jon Walker's new band, The Young Veins debut record, Take a Vacation!.

He played bass and produced several tracks on The Like's second studio album Release Me.

He was the bassist, keyboardist, and secondary vocalist of the supergroup Phases (previously named JJAMZ, in which Greenwald was a guitarist and secondary vocalist until their name change in 2015). The group has been on an unofficial hiatus since late 2016, with a one-off reunion in 2021.

In February 2021, Greenwald featured on musician Sam i's single "Shake".

== JJAMZ ==
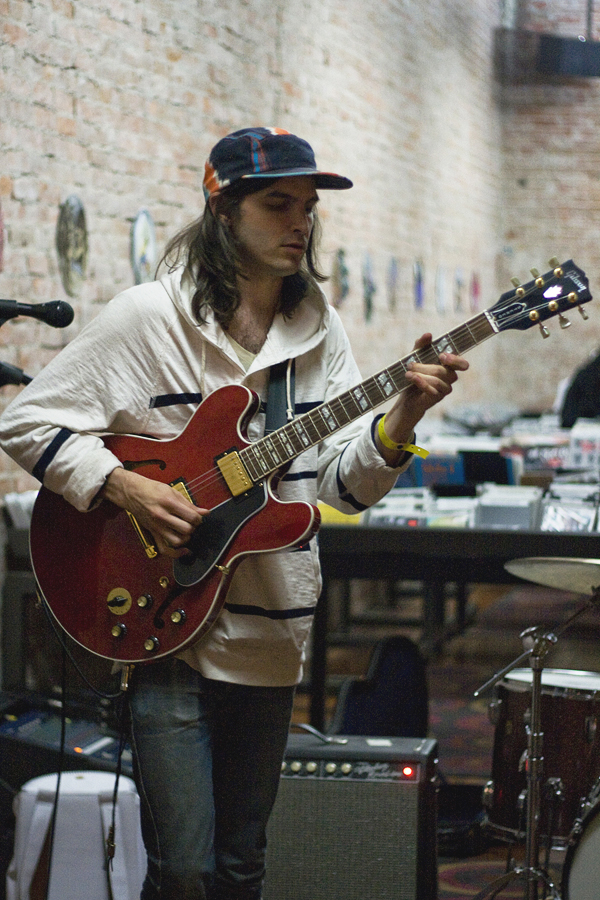
Greenwald performing in May 2010

JJAMZ was a supergroup composed of Greenwald along with James Valentine (Maroon 5), Jason Boesel (Rilo Kiley/Conor Oberst), Michael Runion (solo), and Z Berg (The Like). The group was started at karaoke night at Guys in Hollywood. The band name is an acronym, using the first letter of each member's name. The group was a means of escape from each member's respective band at the time. "JJAMZ started at an interesting time in all of our lives. We all needed some kind of escape from relationships or our other bands. It was a tumultuous time, and the lyrics just came out. It was like word vomit. I can't remember," said Z Berg in one of their first interviews as a band. The band played their first concert at the Echo Plex on January 27, 2009. The band released their debut album, Suicide Pact, on July 10, 2012. It was released through Dangerbird Records.

== Phases ==
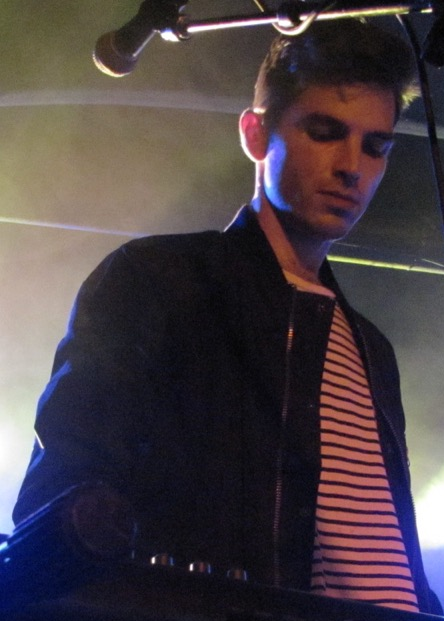
Greenwald performing with Phases at Webster Hall in 2015

Following Valentine's departure from JJAMZ, the band changed its name to Phases. Signed to Warner Bros. Records, Phases was composed of Greenwald, Z Berg, Jason Boesel, and Michael Runion.

== Mark Ronson & The Business International ==
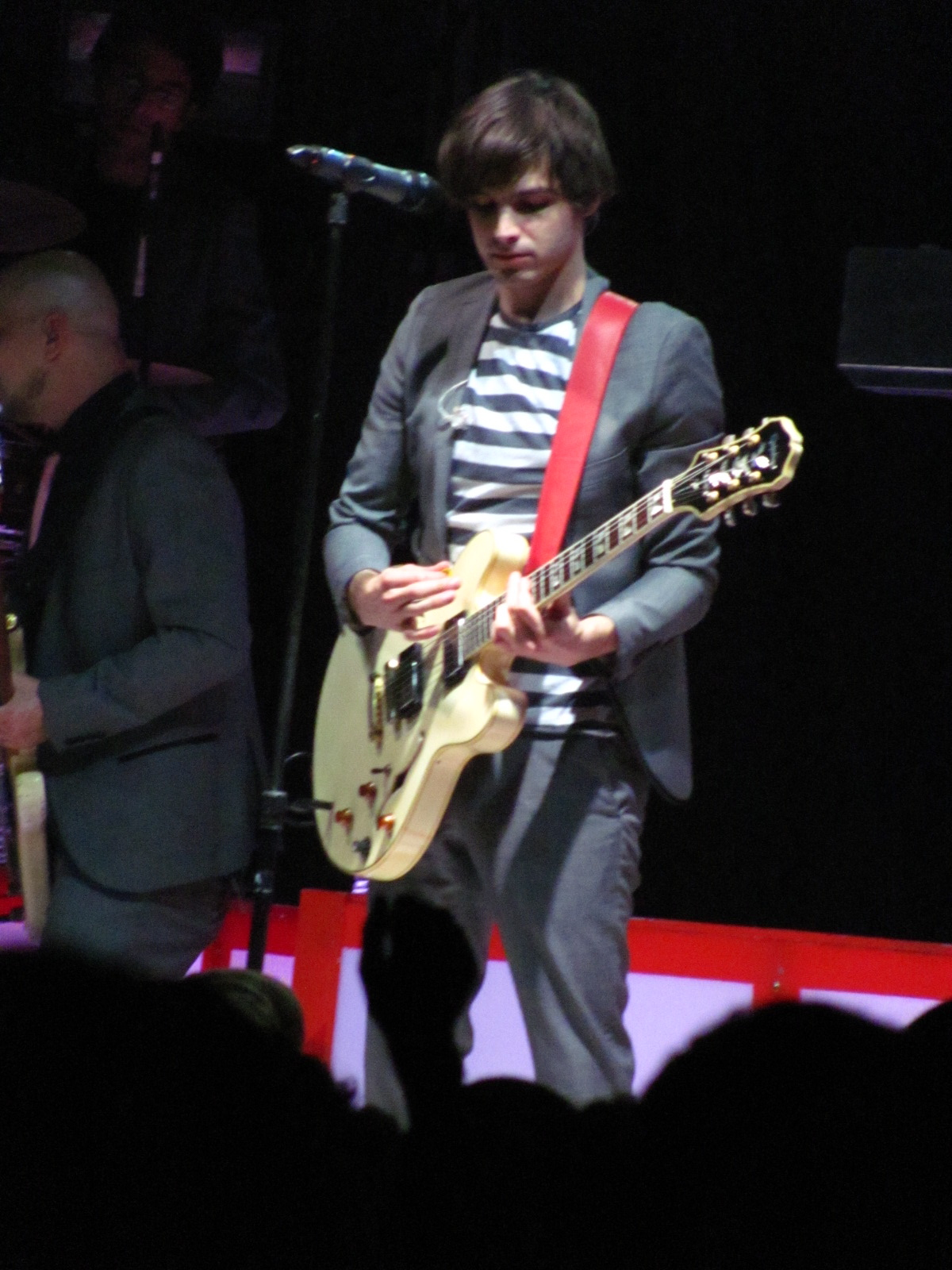
Greenwald performing with Mark Ronson & The Business Intl. at Webster Hall in October 2010

Greenwald is the executive producer and one of the musicians in The Business International. He also helped to write several of the songs on their album Record Collection. He is one of the lead singers in the song 'The Night Last Night', and appeared in the music video for "The Bike Song".

== Cameos ==
In addition to the commercials for the Gap and his appearance in the 2001 film Donnie Darko, Greenwald appeared in two music videos for the electronica band M83 – "Don't Save Us From the Flames" and "Teen Angst", the video for Uffie and Pharrell Williams' "ADD SUV", and also in videos for Mark Ronson, including the second video for "Just".

== Personal life ==
In 2013, Greenwald began a relationship with actress, singer and filmmaker Brie Larson. In May 2016, Larson's representative confirmed that the pair was engaged. They lived together in the Hollywood Hills neighborhood of Los Angeles. In a 2017 USA Today interview, Larson credited Greenwald for creating a safe space for her and for empowering her to take risks in her work. On January 10, 2019, it was reported that Greenwald and Larson had called off their engagement. In June 2020, it was confirmed that Greenwald and Australian actress Phoebe Tonkin were in a relationship, but they have since split up.

== Filmography ==
| Year | Title | Role | Notes |
|---|---|---|---|
| 1993 | The Halloween Tree | Ralph Bengstrum (voice) | TV movie |
| 1993 | Recycle Rex | (Voice) | Short |
| 1994 | A Pig's Tale | Von Hofferman | |
| 1994 | No Dessert, Dad, till You Mow the Lawn | Corby | |
| 1998 | Sabrina the Teenage Witch | Himself (Phantom Planet frontman) | Episode: And the Sabrina Goes to... |
| 2001 | Donnie Darko | Seth Devlin | |
| 2005 | Bad News Bears | State Band Member (with Phantom Planet) | |
| 2017 | Unicorn Store | The Composer | |

== Discography ==
Solo

- Yo (2014)

With JJAMZ

- Suicide Pact (2012)

With Phases

- For Life (2015)

With Phantom Planet

- Phantom Planet Is Missing (1998)
- Polaroid (1999)
- The Guest (2002)
- Negatives (2004)
- Negatives 2 (2004)
- Phantom Planet (2004)
- Raise the Dead (2008)
- Devastator (2020)

With Blackblack

- Blackblack EP 1
- Blackblack EP 2
- BlackBlack (2006)
