= Soft (band) =

American indie rock band

- Origin: New York City, New York, USA
- Genres: Indie rock, shoegazing
- Years active: 2003–present
- Label: Academy Fight Song/Silver Sleeve
- Members: John Reineck; Vincent Perini; Sam Wheeler; Dino Siampos; Chris Colley
- Website: thebandsoft.com

Soft is an American indie rock band from New York City.

== History ==
Soft formed in Brooklyn in 2003, but the group did not begin performing live until more than a year afterwards; for this reason, they were not well known on the New York music scene despite receiving critical acclaim elsewhere. Prior to forming Soft, lead singer John Reineck had previously played in a band called The Siren Six! at the University of Minnesota, and spent a year in Osaka working for a noise music record label after college. The name "Soft" was given to the group by Mickey Madden from Maroon 5, who suggested it after the group opened for one of their shows. The group also opened for such acts as Kiss, Phantom Planet, Hot Chip, and Voxtrot. After releasing several EPs and an LP in Japan, the group's debut full-length, Gone Faded, was released on October 23, 2007. The band recorded a follow-up album in early 2008 with producer Chris Coady which was released in 2011 as Dogs.

== Discography ==
- Hot Club and the Smoke Machine (2006, Japan only release)
- Gone Faded (2007)
- Dogs (2011)

== Members ==
- John Reineck – vocals
- Vincent Perini – guitar
- Sam Wheeler – guitar
- Dino Siampos – bass
- Chris Colley – drums
