= Phantom Planet Is Missing =

1998 studio album by Phantom Planet

Studio album by Phantom Planet
- Released: July 28, 1998
- Recorded: American; Hook, North Hollywood, California; Hully GullyA&M Studios, Hollywood, California; Sony Music Studios, Santa Monica, California
- Genre: Alternative rock; pop rock; power pop
- Length: 34:32
- Label: Geffen
- Producer: Mark Endert; Lee Popa; Phantom Planet; Paul Fox

Phantom Planet chronology
Phantom Planet Is Missing (1998)	Polaroid (1999)

Phantom Planet studio album chronology
Phantom Planet Is Missing (1998)	The Guest (2002)

Singles from Phantom Planet Is Missing
- 1. "So I Fall Again" Released: September 1998 (promotional)

Professional ratings
Review scores
Source	Rating
AllMusic	4/5 stars

Phantom Planet is Missing is the debut album of the American rock band Phantom Planet. It was released in 1998 on Geffen Records. The track "So I Fall Again" was released as a promotional single in September 1998 and was also included on the Geffen release Sabrina the Teenage Witch: The Album, the soundtrack album to the TV series Sabrina the Teenage Witch.

== Track listing ==
Phantom Planet Is Missing track listing
No.	Title	Writer(s)	Length
1.	"I Was Better Off"	Alex Greenwald	2:43
2.	"So I Fall Again"	Alex Greenwald/Darren Robinson/Jason Schwartzman	2:51
3.	"Recently Distressed"	Jacques Brautbar/Alex Greenwald	2:26
4.	"Can't Take It"	Alex Greenwald	3:04
5.	"The Local Black and Red"	Alex Greenwald/Jason Schwartzman	2:24
6.	"Don't Get Down"	Alex Greenwald/Jason Schwartzman	4:11
7.	"Dying of Silence"	Alex Greenwald	3:08
8.	"Down in a Second"	Alex Greenwald	2:58
9.	"Lisa (Does It Hurt You?)"	Jacques Brautbar/Alex Greenwald	3:16
10.	"Rest Easy"	Jacques Brautbar	3:08
11.	"Sleep Machine"	Jacques Brautbar/Alex Greenwald	4:24

== Personnel ==
Phantom Planet

- Alex Greenwald – lead vocals
- Sam Farrar – bass guitar, backing vocals
- Darren Robinson – lead guitar
- Jacques Brautbar – rhythm guitar, backing vocals, lead vocals on "Rest Easy"
- Jason Schwartzman – drums

Additional musicians

- Patrick Warren – keyboards

Production

- Mark Endert, Lee Pop, Phantom Planet, Paul Fox – production
- Ed Thacker and Mark Endert – mixing
- John Dunne – photographer
- Mark Endert, Lee Popa, Phantom Planet, Ed Thacker – engineering
