= Raise the Dead =

Studio album by Phantom Planet
- Released: April 15, 2008
- Recorded: 2007–2008
- Studio: Zeitgeist
- Genre: Alternative rock, garage rock
- Length: 43:07
- Label: Fueled by Ramen
- Producer: Tony Berg

Phantom Planet chronology
Phantom Planet (2004)	Raise the Dead (2008)	Devastator (2020)

Singles from Raise the Dead
- 1. "Do the Panic" Released: March 10, 2008; 2. "Dropped" Released: October 30, 2008

Professional ratings
Review scores
Source	Rating
AbsolutePunk.net	83%
AllMusic	4/5 stars
Blender	2.5/5 stars
Entertainment Weekly	B+
Rolling Stone	3.5/5 stars

Raise the Dead is the fourth studio album by rock band Phantom Planet. It was released on April 15, 2008. The CD includes reworked versions of "Leader" and "Geronimo", both of which appeared on the Limited Edition Tour EP, as well as a reworked version of "Do the Panic", which originally appeared on the band's 'bootleg' fanclub CD Phantom Planet: Negatives. This was also the band's final studio album during their initial run before disbanding later that same year, before reuniting temporarily in 2012, and permanently in 2019, with the latter reunion producing the comeback album Devastator (2020).

Early on in the recording process Phantom Planet's contract with Epic Records expired, which left them searching for a new record label. Soon after this, they signed to Fueled by Ramen. On January 20, 2008, Phantom Planet posted a bulletin on their Myspace page to announce that the official release date would be April 15, 2008. Fueled by Ramen re-released a teaser trailer and stated that the first single from the album would be a reworking of "Do the Panic". The second single was "Dropped". The video, directed by Eric Wareheim, was released in December 2008. The band also recorded "Geronimo" with Dust Brothers in 2005.

In an interview with RaggedMag, vocalist Alex Greenwald explained that "all bands are kind of their own cult, you know, but we want to take it to a new level. We really like the show Lost, and even though it's totally fiction, there's this air of mystery that's lacking in a lot entertainment these days. I really like mystery in things, and what a little bit of enigma brings out of people and their imaginations...a band is about community, and within itself it is a brotherhood; it's companionship. But a band can't be anything without the people to love it. Our goal will be to recruit and befriend as many people as possible with our message."

== Track listing ==
All tracks are written by Alex Greenwald, except "Geronimo" composed by Greenwald and Sam Farrar.

Raise the Dead track listing
No.	Title	Length
1.	"Raise the Dead"	4:27
2.	"Dropped"	3:27
3.	"Leader"	2:49
4.	"Do the Panic"	3:34
5.	"Quarantine"	3:26
6.	"Ship Lost at Sea"	3:33
7.	"Demon Daughters"	4:26
8.	"Geronimo"	2:38
9.	"Too Much, Too Often"	3:29
10.	"Confess"	3:07
11.	"Leave Yourself for Somebody Else"	3:12
12.	"I Don't Mind"	4:57

iTunes deluxe edition
No.	Title	Length
13.	"Ivory Daggers"	2:29
14.	"From This Day On" (originally appeared on Phantom Planet EP)	4:32
15.	"What Are You Waiting For"	3:37

== Personnel ==
=== Musicians ===
Phantom Planet

- Alex Greenwald – lead vocals, rhythm guitar
- Sam Farrar – bass guitar, backing vocals
- Darren Robinson – lead guitar, backing vocals
- Jeff Conrad – drums

Additional musicians

- Children's Choir – vocals on "Leader"

=== Production ===
- Tony Berg – producer
- Stephen Marcussen – mastering
- Awesome "Shawn" Everett – mixing

== Charts ==
Chart performance for Raise the Dead
Chart (2008)	Peak position
US Billboard 200	119
