= Polaroid =

Polaroid most often refers to:

- Polaroid Corporation, an American company known for its instant film and cameras
  - Instant cameras, including Polaroid-branded cameras
  - Instant film, including Polaroid-branded film
- Polaroid B.V., a Dutch manufacturer of instant film and cameras, owner of Polaroid Corporation's brand and intellectual property

Polaroid may also refer to:

== Music ==
- Polaroid (album), by Phantom Planet
- Polaroids: A Greatest Hits Collection, a compilation album by Shawn Colvin
- "Polaroid" (Jonas Blue, Liam Payne and Lennon Stella song), 2018
- "Polaroid" (Keith Urban song), 2020
- "Polaroid", a 2015 song by Imagine Dragons from Smoke + Mirrors
- "Polaroid", a 2022 song by (G)I-dle from I Never Die
- "Polaroid de locura ordinaria", a 1988 song by Fito Páez
- "Polaroid", a song from the 1999 PlayStation game Vib-Ribbon

== Other uses ==
- Polaroid (polarizer), a type of synthetic plastic sheet used to polarize light
- Polaroid Eyewear, with glare-reducing polarized lenses made from Polaroid's polarizer
- Polaroid (film), a 2019 American horror film directed by Lars Klevberg

== See also ==
- Betina Polaroid, Brazilian drag queen
- Poloroid or Danielle "Dan" Rowe, singer-songwriter
- Polar (disambiguation)
