= Phantom Planet EP =

EP by Phantom Planet
- Released: 2007
- Genre: Rock
- Length: 13:41
- Label: Fueled by Ramen

Phantom Planet chronology
Phantom Planet (2004)	Phantom Planet EP (2007)	Raise the Dead (2008)

Phantom Planet EP is a limited-edition tour EP by the American rock band Phantom Planet. It features three songs later included on their studio album Raise the Dead (2008), as well as one b-side. The EP was released during the band's 2007 West Coast tour with Maroon 5, was sold at shows and through the Fueled by Ramen webstore, and was later made available as a digital download. The album versions differ slightly from the EP recordings.

== Track listing ==
No.	Title	Length
1.	"Leader (EP Version)"	2:53
2.	"Geronimo (EP Version)"	2:47
3.	"Too Much To Often (EP Version)"	3:31
4.	"From This Day On (EP Version)"	4:30
