= Devastator (album) =

Studio album by Phantom Planet
- Released: June 18, 2020
- Recorded: 2019–2020
- Length: 42:50
- Label: Gong
- Producer: Tony Berg

Phantom Planet chronology
Raise the Dead (2008)	Devastator (2020)	Devastator (Remixes, Pt. 1) (2020)

Singles from Devastator
- 1. "Balisong" Released: May 7, 2019; 2. "Party Animal" Released: September 13, 2019; 3. "Time Moves On" Released: March 13, 2020; 4. "Only One" Released: April 30, 2020

Devastator is the fifth studio album by American rock band Phantom Planet. It was released on June 18, 2020 by Gong Records and preceded by the singles "Balisong", "Party Animal", "Time Moves On" and "Only One". This is their first studio album in 12 years since Raise the Dead (2008). The album was originally scheduled to be released on May 8, 2020, but was pushed back to June 19, due to the COVID-19 pandemic. The release was later moved up one day earlier, as a sign of respect to the Black Lives Matter movement so it would not fall on the same day as Juneteenth. Devastator is also Phantom Planet's last album with longtime drummer Jeff Conrad, who left the band in 2024 after a total of twenty years as the band's drummer.

== Track listing ==
Devastator track listing
No.	Title	Length
1.	"Balisong"	3:40
2.	"Party Animal"	3:27
3.	"Only One"	4:10
4.	"Leave a Little Light On"	4:03
5.	"Time Moves On"	4:30
6.	"Through the Trees"	4:08
7.	"Torture Me"	3:58
8.	"Dear Dead End"	3:23
9.	"Waiting for the Lights to Change"	4:42
10.	"Gold Body Spray"	2:49
11.	"ROTK"	4:00
Total length:		42:50

== Personnel ==
=== Phantom Planet ===
- Alex Greenwald – lead vocals, rhythm guitar, keyboards, programming
- Sam Farrar – bass guitar, backing vocals, keyboards
- Darren Robinson – lead guitar, backing vocals
- Jeff Conrad – drums, percussion

=== Production ===
- Tony Berg – production
- Patricia Sullivan – mastering
- Shawn Everett – mixing
- Will Maclellan – engineering, mixing
- Joseph Lorge – engineering, mixing
