= Sabrina the Teenage Witch: The Album =

Soundtrack album by various artists
- Released: October 27, 1998
- Genre: Pop; alternative rock
- Length: 56:54
- Label: Geffen
- Producer: Absolute; Timmy Allen; Ben Folds Five; Larry Campbell; Chumbawamba; Delgado; Mark Endert; Neil Ferguson; Richard Gottehrer; Johnny Jam; Tore Johansson; Michael Mangini; Max Martin; Claus Norreen; Denniz Pop; Søren Rasted; Veit Renn; Ralph Sall; Caleb Southern; Matthew Wilder; Eric Foster White

Singles from Sabrina the Teenage Witch: The Album
- 1. "So I Fall Again" Released: September 1998 (promotional)

Sabrina the Teenage Witch: The Album is a soundtrack album for the television series Sabrina The Teenage Witch, released on October 27, 1998, by Geffen Records. The album mainly contains music by contemporary pop and alternative rock artists, such as the Spice Girls, Sugar Ray, and Britney Spears. Most of the songs on the soundtrack were either featured in the series or are by artists that made appearances in the series. The album also includes series actress Melissa Joan Hart's cover of Blondie's "One Way or Another". The album was preceded by the release of the promotional single "So I Fall Again" by Phantom Planet in September 1998, having previously appeared on the band's debut album Phantom Planet Is Missing released in July earlier that year.

The album was a commercial success, being certified Gold by the RIAA in the United States and double Platinum in Canada, and selling over 700,000 copies in those countries combined.

== Background ==
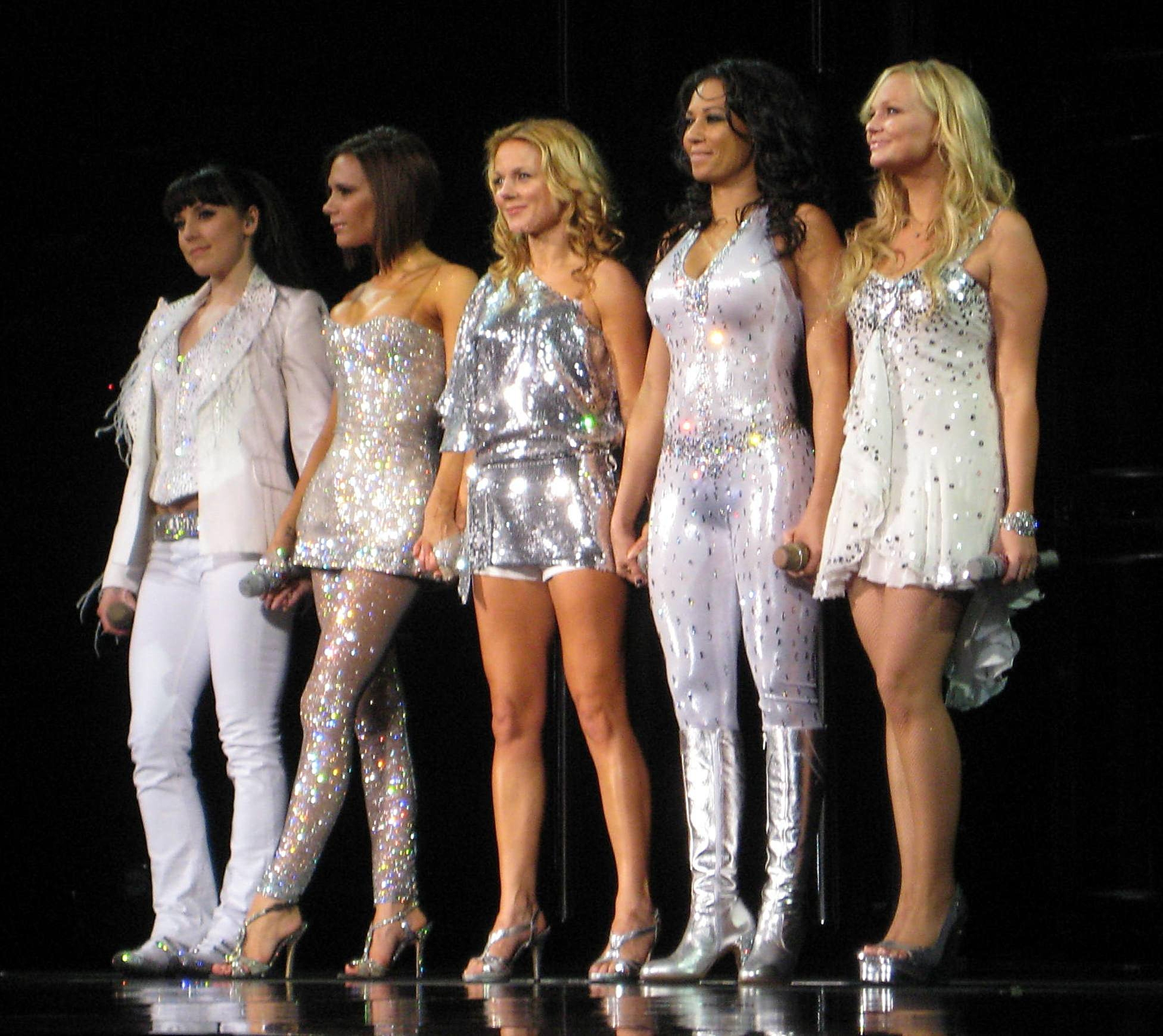
The Spice Girls (pictured in 2008) perform the opening song to the soundtrack, "Walk of Life".

Sabrina the Teenage Witch: The Album was first announced by MTV on August 27, 1998. The track list was revealed a few weeks later on September 15, 1998, the sequencing of which was slightly modified prior to its release. Geffen Records Artists and repertoire executive Craig Coburn headed the project, which generally consists of music by pop and alternative rock artists. The album includes a number of songs that were previously unreleased, including a cover of "Abracadabra" by Sugar Ray, a remix of "Hey, Mr. DJ (Keep Playin' This Song)" by the Backstreet Boys, and "Soda Pop" by Britney Spears. The opening track to the album is "Walk of Life" by the Spice Girls, which had previously only been available in Europe as the b-side to their 1997 single "Too Much"; Coburn said the label was "thrilled" to have the song on the soundtrack. It also includes "Doctor Jones (Metro's 7" Edit)" by Aqua, which likewise had previously only been available in Europe. Melissa Joan Hart's cover of "One Way or Another", which was used in the Season 2 episode "The Band Episode", is also included. In addition to Hart, the song features background vocals by series cast members Nate Richert and Lindsay Sloane.

The album was preceded by the release of the single "So I Fall Again" by Phantom Planet in September 1998; the band performed the song on the show in the Season 3 episode "And the Sabrina Goes to..." which aired that November. The album was promoted through radio promotions and giveaways. One giveaway prize was a trip to see Phantom Planet perform at Universal Studios Hollywood with their performance being hosted by Hart. Another promotion for the album was the "Sabrina Sing-A-Long Sweepstakes" in which the grand prize was a trip to Hollywood to have a song professionally recorded. The sweepstakes was advertised in the Sabrina book series, the Archie comic books, and Sabrina CD-ROM games. The album tied-in with the third season of the show. The overarching plot of the season was for Sabrina to collect a number of clues to solve her "family secret" and the eighth clue was included as an audio interlude on the release.

== Critical reception ==
Sabrina the Teenage Witch: The Album received mostly positive reviews from music critics. AllMusic described the album as a "sugar-coated collection". They wrote that europop was well-represented on the release, calling "Walk of Life" by the Spice Girls "some serious dub", and noted the inclusion of "interesting" cover songs. Richard Harrington from The Washington Post praised Sugar Ray's cover of "Abracadabra", calling it the "obvious cover of the year with MTV and radio exposure clearly in mind". Harrington described the album as "a mix of bright chirpy dance-pop and pop-rock".

In a mixed review, Rob Brunner from Entertainment Weekly described Sabrina the Teenage Witch: The Album as "bubbly ephemera" and went on to note "all this wholesome cheer would be strictly taboo in even the most good-natured teen coven." He criticized Matthew Sweet's cover of "Magnet & Steel", calling it "less than enchanting". In a retrospective review, Chuck Eddy from Spin included the album on a list of "essential teen-pop soundtracks", and described "Soda Pop" by Britney Spears as "possibly her most preadolescent ditty ever".

== Commercial reception ==
Sabrina the Teenage Witch: The Album peaked at number 71 on the Billboard 200 chart in the issue dated December 12, 1998, and spent 16 weeks on the chart. In Canada, the album peaked at number 7 on the RPM Top 100 Albums chart in the issue dated February 1, 1999. It remained in this position for two weeks and spent a total of 36 weeks on the chart. The album appeared at number 50 on the RPM year-end charts in 1999. The album was certified Gold by the RIAA in the United States on December 7, 1998. In Canada, the album was certified Platinum on January 21, 1999 and double Platinum on March 12, 1999.

== Track listing ==
No.	Title	Writer(s)	Performer(s)	Length
1.	"Walk of Life"	Spice Girls; Andy Watkins; Paul Wilson	Spice Girls	4:16
2.	"Abracadabra"	Steve Miller	Sugar Ray	3:43
3.	"Hey, Mr. DJ (Keep Playin' This Song)" (Radio Mix)	Timmy Allen; Larry Campbell; Jolyon Skinner	Backstreet Boys	3:51
4.	"One Way or Another"	Debbie Harry; Nigel Harrison	Melissa Joan Heart	3:29
5.	"Kate"	Ben Folds; Darren Jessee; Anna Goodman	Ben Folds Five	3:13
6.	"Show Me Love" (Radio Edit)	Robyn; Max Martin	Robyn	3:29
7.	"Giddy Up"	'N Sync; Veit Renn	'N Sync	4:09
8.	"Slam Dunk (Da Funk)"	Denniz Pop; Martin; Jake Schulze; Herbie Crichlow	Five	3:37
9.	"Magnet & Steel"	Walter Egan	Matthew Sweet	4:10
10.	"So I Fall Again"	Alex Greenwald; Darren Robinson; Jason Schwartzman	Phantom Planet	2:51
11.	"I Know What Boys Like"	Chris Butler	Pure Sugar	3:53
12.	"Smash"	Charlotte Caffey; Jane Wiedlin; The Murmurs	The Murmurs	2:35
13.	"Doctor Jones" (Metro's 7" Edit)	Anders Øland; Søren Rasted; Claus Norreen; René Dif	Aqua	3:37
14.	"Soda Pop"	Mikey Bassie; Eric Foster White	Britney Spears	3:43
15.	"Amnesia" (Radio Remix)	Chumbawamba	Chumbawamba	3:12
16.	"Blah, Blah, Blah"	Nina Persson; Peter Svensson	The Cardigans	3:12

== Charts ==
=== Weekly charts ===
Weekly chart performance for Sabrina The Teenage Witch: The Album
Chart (1998–1999)	Peak position
Canadian Albums (RPM)	7
US Billboard 200	71

=== Year-end charts ===
1999 year-end chart performance for Sabrina The Teenage Witch: The Album
Chart (1999)	Peak position
Canadian Albums (RPM)	50

== Certifications and sales ==
Certifications and sales for Sabrina The Teenage Witch: The Album
Region	Certification	Certified units/sales
Canada (Music Canada)	2× Platinum	200,000^{^}
United States (RIAA)	Gold	500,000^{^}
^{^} Shipments figures based on certification alone.
