= OMFGG – Original Music Featured on Gossip Girl No. 1 =

Soundtrack album by various artists
- Released: 2 September 2008
- Recorded: Various dates
- Genre: Indie pop, indie rock, electronic, alternative dance
- Length: 48:35
- Label: Atlantic

OMFGG – Original Music Featured on Gossip Girl No. 1 is the soundtrack to The CW television series Gossip Girl, including music featured throughout its first season. It was released digitally on September 2, 2008 (one day after the second season premiere), followed by a CD release on October 28.

== Track listing ==
No.	Title	Artist(s)	Length
1.	"Sour Cherry"	The Kills	3:06
2.	"Do You Wanna"	The Kooks	4:03
3.	"Do the Panic"	Phantom Planet	3:33
4.	"Feeling Better"	The Teenagers	3:03
5.	"One Week of Danger" (Demo Version)	The Virgins	3:38
6.	"Got Your Number"	Nadia Oh featuring Space Cowboy	3:05
7.	"Crimewave"	Crystal Castles vs. Health	4:18
8.	"Fight Song"	The Republic Tigers	3:47
9.	"Cities in Dust"	Junkie XL	4:17
10.	"We Started Nothing"	The Ting Tings	4:26
11.	"Breakfast in NYC"	Oppenheimer	2:23
12.	"Three Wishes"	The Pierces	3:42
13.	"Hard to Live in the City"	Albert Hammond Jr.	5:14

iTunes Store bonus tracks
No.	Title	Artist	Length
14.	"Everytime"	Lincoln Hawk	2:55
15.	"Glamorous"	Constance Billard a Cappella Choir	1:52
