= Version (album) =

Studio album by Mark Ronson
- Released: 16 April 2007
- Recorded: 2005–2007
- Studios: Allido Sound (New York City); Metropolis (London); Sarm West (London); Daptone (New York City); MCP Pacific View
- Genres: Pop soul; funk; Motown sound
- Length: 43:53
- Labels: Allido; Columbia; Sony BMG
- Producer: Mark Ronson

Mark Ronson chronology
Here Comes the Fuzz (2003)	Version (2007)	Record Collection (2010)

Singles from Version
- 1. "Stop Me" Released: 2 April 2007; 2. "Oh My God" Released: 16 July 2007; 3. "Valerie" Released: 15 October 2007; 4. "Just" Released: 15 February 2008

Version is the second studio album by British musician, DJ and producer Mark Ronson, first released on 16 April 2007 through Allido and Columbia Records. It is an album of cover versions (Note: Interspersed with three original instrumental interlude tracks by Ronson.) featuring a retro-inspired sound that Ronson considers to be reminiscent of Motown and Stax releases. The album cost more than £870,000 to launch. Version reached number 2 on the UK Albums Chart and has sold 105,584 copies as of January 2015.

== Reception ==
=== Critical ===
Professional ratings
Review scores
Source	Rating
AllMusic	3/5 stars
DIY	4/5 stars
The Guardian	4/5 stars
IGN	(9/10)
Line of Best Fit	(60%)
NME	(favourable)
Okayplayer	4.5/5 stars
Pitchfork	(3.3/10)
Rolling Stone	3/5 stars
Stylus Magazine	(B)

Critical response to the album was generally positive. Alexis Petridis of The Guardian claimed "He really hit commercial paydirt in the world of gobby, femme-fronted British pop, working on Lily Allen's Alright, Still and Amy Winehouse's Back To Black. Both appear on his second album, which, reasonably enough, sees Ronson largely abandoning rap. In its place comes the musical formula that served him so well on Winehouse's hit single Rehab – an affectionate pastiche of a 60s soul revue's brass-laden sound. As the album's title suggests, the formula is applied to cover versions of unlikely alt-rock tracks." Priya Elan of NME with praise said "A collection of covers of modern classics, his choices are faultless and his sense of fun is very apparent...for its irresistible sense of fun, ‘Version’ shouldn't be ignored." John Murphy of MusicOMH wrote "Version is destined to become one of the great party albums of the summer – just playing it once is guaranteed to cheer you up. There may be a few too many blaring brass sections at times, but Ronson's superb productions skills means he just about gets away with it. One of the more intriguing albums of the year, watch out for Ronson's star to rise even more over the next few months."

Mike Gadd of Okayplayer commented "Loose, funky, and soaked in soul, Version is not only Mark Ronson's best release yet, it is perhaps the best release of the year. Devoid of amusing adaptations and with tongue-in-cheek remixes nowhere in sight, Version is hardly Ronson getting his Weird Al on, but it's not a stuffy and serious selection of songs, either. It's just one of the world's best DJs getting busy - wiping the dust off, mixing things up, and reintroducing us to some old (and new) favorites." James Cobb of Stylus declared "on its own merits, Version is one of the most vibrant, invigorating works of pop music to pass by my ears in a while." Rob Sheffield of Rolling Stone gave the album three-out-of-five stars, calling Version "an audacious set of similar left-field covers...turned into dance-soul tracks."

Despite the praise, the album inspired a number of mixed reviews. Rich Hughes of Line of Best Fit gave it a 60% rating, saying that "whilst it was an admirable project and some of the results here are genuinely great, the misses just seem to dominate it." Michelle Dhillon called the album "a conglomeration of obvious singles, littered with distinctly horrible numbers that are better ignored."

In February 2008, Ronson received a BRIT Award for Best British Male Solo Artist over favourite Mika. He also performed a medley of 3 songs from the album, the most acclaimed being "Valerie" in which Amy Winehouse appeared. After the ceremony, Version soared from 22 to 4 in the UK Albums chart.

=== Commercial ===
Version debuted at number 2 in the UK. Overall, the album has spent 45 weeks in the UK Top 75, with 10 weeks in the top 10. In June 2019, the album was certified triple platinum in the UK for sales of over 900,000 units. BBC Radio 1 listed the album as the 12th most successful of 2007 in the UK, outperforming the likes of Justin Timberlake, Foo Fighters, Nelly Furtado and Lily Allen. Version peaked at No. 129 on the Billboard 200. As of 2010, the album has sold 65,000 copies in United States.

The album was supported by the success of single "Stop Me", which charted at number 2 in the UK, top 5 of the US Dance charts, and in the top 40 of Italy and Australia. Upon its release, the album managed to crack into the World Top 40, charting at 29. Ronson's next single, "Oh My God" with Lily Allen, became his second top 10 single, peaking at 8 in the UK. "Valerie", Ronson's third single, also peaked at number 2 in the British charts, kept out of the top spot by the Sugababes. It has spent a dozen weeks in the top 10 and has sold well over 300,000 copies. The song ended the year as the ninth biggest seller, behind number 1's "Bleeding Love", "Umbrella", "Grace Kelly" among others. "Valerie" also charted in the Switzerland and New Zealand charts and even managed to top the Dutch Top 40 for four consecutive weeks, keeping Leona Lewis from the top spot. Ronson released "Just", featuring Alex Greenwald and Sam Farrar of Phantom Planet, as the fourth and final single from the album. The song was quickly added to BBC Radio 1's "A-List".

== Track listing ==
No.	Title	Writer(s)	Original artist	Length
1.	"God Put a Smile upon Your Face" (featuring the Daptone Horns)	Chris Martin; Will Champion; Guy Berryman; Jonny Buckland	Coldplay	3:12
2.	"Oh My God" (featuring Lily Allen)	Ricky Wilson; Andrew White; Simon Rix; Nick Baines; Nick Hodgson	Kaiser Chiefs	3:35
3.	"Stop Me" (featuring Daniel Merriweather)	Morrissey; Johnny Marr; Holland–Dozier–Holland	The Smiths and The Supremes	3:53
4.	"Toxic" (featuring Ol' Dirty Bastard and Tiggers)	Cathy Dennis; Christian Karlsson; Pontus Winnberg; Henrik Jonback; Russell Jones (add.)	Britney Spears	4:05
5.	"Valerie" (featuring Amy Winehouse)	Dave McCabe; Russell Pritchard; Sean Payne; Abi Harding; Paul Molloy; Boyan Chowdhury	The Zutons	3:39
6.	"Apply Some Pressure" (featuring Paul Smith)	Duncan Lloyd; Paul Smith	Maxïmo Park	3:36
7.	"Inversion"	Mark Ronson	Original	1:47
8.	"Pretty Green" (featuring Santigold)	Paul Weller; Santi White (add.)	The Jam	3:16
9.	"Just" (featuring Phantom Planet)	Thom Yorke; Jonny Greenwood; Colin Greenwood; Ed O'Brien; Philip Selway	Radiohead	5:20
10.	"Amy" (featuring Kenna)	Ryan Adams	Ryan Adams	3:32
11.	"The Only One I Know" (featuring Robbie Williams)	Martin Blunt; Tim Burgess; Jon Brookes; Rob Collins; Jonathan Baker	The Charlatans	4:00
12.	"Diversion"	Ronson	Original	1:19
13.	"L.S.F. (Lost Souls Forever)" (featuring Kasabian)	Sergio Pizzorno; Christopher Karloff	Kasabian	3:30
14.	"Outversion"	Ronson	Original	1:50

Digital deluxe edition bonus tracks
No.	Title	Writer(s)	Original artist	Length
15.	"Pistol of Fire" (featuring D. Smith)	Caleb Followill; Nathan Followill; Angelo Petraglia	Kings of Leon	2:57
16.	"No One Knows" (featuring Domino Kirke)	Josh Homme; Mark Lanegan	Queens of the Stone Age	4:37
17.	"You're All I Need to Get By" (featuring Wale and Tawiah)	Clifford Smith; Robert Diggs; Nickolas Ashford; Valerie Simpson	Method Man and Mary J. Blige	3:10

Japanese edition bonus track
No.	Title	Writer(s)	Original artist	Length
15.	"Stop Me" (featuring Daniel Merriweather) (Kissy Sellout remix)	Morrissey; Marr; Holland-Dozier-Holland	The Smiths and The Supremes	5:36

== Personnel ==
- Mark Ronson – guitar (tracks 1, 3, 4, 6–10 and 12–14), beats (tracks 1–4, 8, 9, 12 and 14), bass (tracks 1, 2, 4, 8 and 10), clavinet (tracks 2, 3, 10, 11 and 14), organ (tracks 1, 4, 6 and 11), percussion (tracks 7, 9 and 10), piano and handclaps (track 7), production, recording (tracks 1, 2, 4 and 7–14), recording assistance (tracks 3, 5 and 6)
- Dave Guy – trumpet (tracks 1, 2 and 4–14)
- Neal Sugarman – tenor saxophone (tracks 1, 2 and 4–14)
- Sam Koppelman – percussion (tracks 1–4, 6, 8 and 11–14), drums (tracks 1 and 8)
- Ian Hendrickson-Smith – baritone saxophone (tracks 1, 2, 4, 5 and 8–14)
- Alex Gale – bass (tracks 2, 12 and 13)
- Chris Elliott – string arrangements (tracks 3, 5 and 6), piano (track 6)
- Boguslaw Kostecki – violin (tracks 3, 5 and 6)
- Cathy Thompson – violin (tracks 3, 5 and 6)
- Chris Tombling – violin (tracks 3, 5 and 6)
- Emlyn Singleton – violin (tracks 3, 5 and 6)
- Everton Nelson – violin (tracks 3, 5 and 6)
- Gavyn Wright – violin (tracks 3, 5 and 6)
- Perry Montague-Mason – violin (tracks 3, 5 and 6)
- Rita Manning – violin (tracks 3, 5 and 6)
- Tom Pigott-Smith – violin (tracks 3, 5 and 6)
- Warren Zielinski – violin (tracks 3, 5 and 6)
- Bruce White – viola (tracks 3, 5 and 6)
- Garfield Jackson – viola (tracks 3, 5 and 6)
- Peter Lale – viola (tracks 3, 5 and 6)
- Rachel Bolt – viola (tracks 3, 5 and 6)
- Homer Steinweiss – drums (tracks 5, 6 and 11)
- Michael Tighe – guitar (tracks 2 and 4), vocals (track 4)
- Stuart Zender – bass (tracks 3 and 6)
- Thomas Brenneck – guitar (tracks 5 and 11)
- Binky Griptite – guitar (tracks 5 and 11)
- Nick Movshon – bass (tracks 5 and 11)
- Cochemea Galecum – baritone saxophone (tracks 6 and 7)
- Chris Scianni – guitar (tracks 12 and 13)
- Jordan Galland – piano and electric piano (tracks 12 and 13)
- The Daptone Horns – horns (track 1)
- Lily Allen – vocals (track 2)
- Daniel Merriweather – vocals (track 3)
- Ben Chappell – cello (track 3)
- Dave Daniels – cello (track 3)
- Martin Loveday – cello (track 3)
- Ol' Dirty Bastard – vocals (track 4)
- Alia-Marie – backing vocals (track 4)
- Cenophia Mitchell – backing vocals (track 4)
- Amy Winehouse – vocals (track 5)
- Questlove – percussion (track 5)
- Paul Smith – vocals (track 6)
- Matt Allchin – guitar (track 6)
- Santigold – vocals (track 8)
- Alex Greenwald – vocals and guitar (track 9)
- Sam Farrar – bass and recording (track 9)
- Kenna – vocals (track 10)
- Robbie Williams – vocals (track 11)
- Tom Meighan – vocals (track 13)
- Sergio Pizzorno – guitar and backing vocals (track 13)
- Christopher Karloff – guitar (track 13)
- Chris Edwards – bass (track 13)
- Ian Matthews – drums (track 13)
- Raymond Angry – clavinet (track 14)
- Derek Pacuk – recording (tracks 1, 2, 4 and 7–14), recording assistance (tracks 3, 5 and 6)
- Dom Morley – recording (tracks 3, 5 and 6)
- Gabriel Roth – recording (track 5)
- Ian Gore – recording assistance (tracks 3, 5 and 6)
- Rohan Onraet – recording assistance (tracks 3, 5 and 6)
- Taz Mattar – recording assistance (tracks 3, 5 and 6)
- John Hanes – additional Pro Tools engineering (tracks 1–4, 7, 8, 10 and 12–14)
- Tim Roberts – engineering assistance (tracks 1–4, 7, 8, 10 and 12–14)
- Serban Ghenea – mixing (tracks 1–4, 7, 8, 10 and 12–14)
- Tom Elmhirst – mixing (tracks 5, 6 and 11)
- Russell Elevado – mixing (track 9)
- Dan Parry – mixing assistance (tracks 5 and 6)
- Andy Marcinkowski – mixing assistance (track 6)
- Steef Van De Gevel – mixing assistance (track 9)
- Matt Paul – mixing assistance (track 11)

== Charts ==
=== Weekly charts ===
Chart (2007)	Peak position
Dutch Albums (Album Top 100)	44
Irish Albums (IRMA)	21
Italian Albums (FIMI)	93
Scottish Albums (Official Charts)	4
Swiss Albums (Schweizer Hitparade)	51
UK Albums (Official Charts)	2
US Billboard 200	129
US Heatseekers Albums (Billboard)	3

=== Year-end charts ===
Chart (2007)	Position
UK Albums (OCC)	12
Chart (2008)	Position
UK Albums (OCC)	46

== Certifications ==
Region	Certification	Certified units/sales
Ireland (IRMA)	Platinum	15,000^{^}
New Zealand (RMNZ)	Platinum	15,000^{‡}
United Kingdom (BPI)	3× Platinum	900,000^{‡}
^{^} Shipments figures based on certification alone.^{‡} Sales+streaming figures based on certification alone.

== Release history ==
Country	Date
United Kingdom	16 April 2007
United States	10 July 2007
Brazil	22 July 2008
