= Do the Panic =

Single by Phantom Planet

from the album Negatives and Raise the Dead
- Released: March 10, 2008
- Recorded: Fueled by Ramen, LLC.
- Genre: Garage rock, alternative rock
- Length: 3:34 (Raise the Dead version); 3:25 (Negatives version)
- Label: Fueled by Ramen
- Songwriters: Alex Greenwald, Jason Schwartzman
- Producer: Tony Berg

Phantom Planet singles chronology
| "Just" (2008) | "Do the Panic" (2008) | "Dropped" (2008) |

Music video
- "Do the Panic" on YouTube

"Do the Panic" is a song by the American rock band Phantom Planet, which first appeared in the 2001 film Don's Plum and was first released in 2004 on their album Negatives. The song was co-written by frontman Alex Greenwald and then-drummer Jason Schwartzman. In March 2008, the song was re-released with different lyrics on their album Raise the Dead and also as a single. The 2008 version also featured in a first season episode of Gossip Girl, as well as its soundtrack OMFGG and was used as part of the Fox Broadcasting Company's fall 2008 ad campaign. The song also appears in EA's NHL 09 and for the TV spots for 50/50.

The music video premiered in early May 2008. It is a horror movie spoof, showing the band members missing several body parts. This video also includes a short audio clip from a remixed version of "Leader" playing before the actual song kicks in.

In early 2008, Rolling Stone gave the song and its accompanying album a rating of 3.5/5 stars, commenting "Raise the Dead gives its macabre subjects (and its lighter ones) an oddly upbeat spin. Jumping from Bowie glam to disco punk, the band tosses in synths, arch backing coos and riffing saxes for songs that are both expansive and strange." It was number 71 on Rolling Stone's list of the 100 Best Songs of 2008.

== Do the Panic EP ==
| No. | Title | Length |
|---|---|---|
| 1. | "Do the Panic" | 3:34 |
| 2. | "Ivory Daggers" | 2:29 |
| 3. | "What You Waiting For" | 3:37 |

== Music video ==
The music video for the song, directed by Mike Myerburg, features the band performing in a log cabin. Throughout the video, band members are seen running through the woods outside, only to have their limbs hacked off by an unseen killer. As each band member is killed, the band shots show that member now missing from the performance until only singer Alex Greenwald is left. However, the limbs that had been hacked off by the killer come back to life to play the rest of the song with Greenwald.

== Weekly charts ==
2008 weekly chart performance for "Do the Panic"
| Chart (2008) | Peak position |
|---|---|
| Czech Republic Modern Rock (IFPI) | 10 |
