= Pat Carroll (singer) =

Australian singer (born 1946)

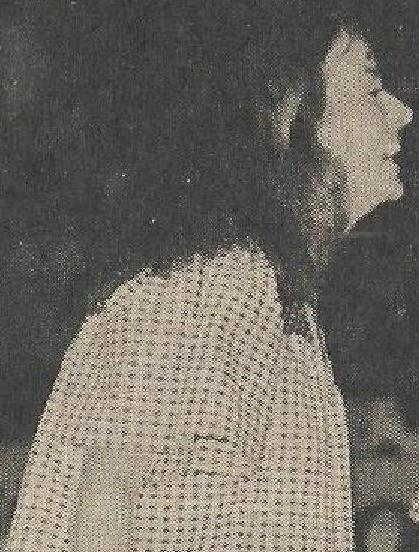
- Carroll performing in 1972
- Born: 1946 (age 79–80); Melbourne, Victoria, Australia
- Occupation: Singer
- Spouse: John Farrar (m. 1969)
- Children: 2; including Sam Farrar
- Musical career
- Genres: Pop
- Years active: 1954–present
- Labels: W&G, Interfusion

Pat Carroll (born 1946) is an Australian singer in the 1960s and early 1970s, she is probably best known for her television appearances and her collaboration with Olivia Newton-John.

== Biography and career ==
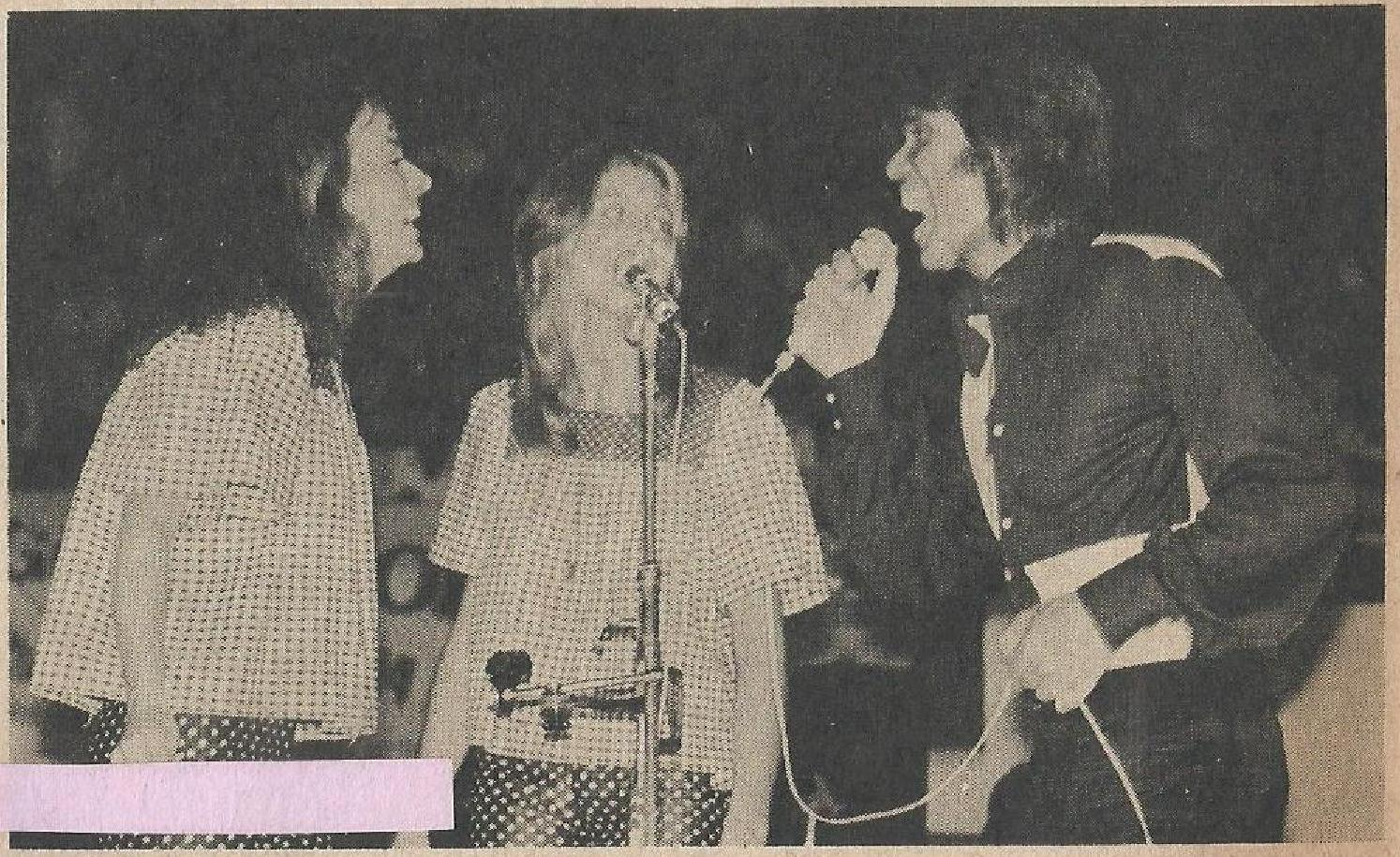
Carroll (left) performing with Olivia Newton-John (centre) and Cliff Richard (right) in 1972

Carroll was born in Melbourne, Victoria began her entertainment career at age eight when she started taking singing and dancing lessons. Appearances on children's TV shows followed by the time she was eleven years old. She continued by appearing in musical comedy shows such as Carnival and Bye Bye Birdie.

This led to appearing on national Australian pop TV shows such as Bandstand and The Go!! Show when in her mid-teens. Her first 45 single "He's My Guy" was released when she was 18.

In the mid-1960s Carroll and her friend Olivia Newton-John formed a singing duo called Pat and Olivia. Having won a song contest in Melbourne, they travelled to the United Kingdom, where they achieved some success on TV and in clubs. After a period of performing there, Carroll's visa expired, forcing her to return to Australia where she married in 1969 ex-Strangers member, John Farrar.

Carroll released a number of singles with W&G Records and Interfusion during the 1960s and early 1970s most of which failed to chart. Her most successful single in Australia was her cover of Dana's 1970 Eurovision winner "All Kinds of Everything". However Carroll's best known single is "To the Sun" on account of its featuring Cliff Richard on backing vocals.

At about 1970, Farrar quit the Strangers and, with Carroll, returned to London. The two renewed their acquaintance with Newton-John. During 1970s and 1980s, Carroll often sang backing vocals on Newton-John's albums and singles, many of which were written and produced by Farrar.

Currently living in Malibu, California (US) with husband John Farrar: her first son Sam Farrar (born 29 June 1978) is the bass player of the American bands Phantom Planet and Maroon 5. Her second son, Max Farrar, is the keyboardist/guitarist of the rock 'n' roll band Azura. Carroll is the mother-in-law of former Agent Sparks member Stephanie Eitel, who is married to Sam.

== Discography ==
=== Extended plays ===
List of EP, with selected details
Title	EP details
The Many Faces of Pat Carroll	Released: 1965; Format: 7" Vinyl; Label: W&G (WG-E-2408)
Requests	Released: 1965; Format: 7" Vinyl; Label: W&G (WG-E-2559)

=== Singles ===
List of singles, with selected chart positions
Year	Title	Peak chart positions
Year	Title	AUS
1964	"He's My Guy"/"He Love Me Too"	-
1965	"Where Have You Been?"/"That's All You Do"	-
1965	"I Know (You Don't Love Me No More)"/"Chained to a Memory"	-
1965	"Why Do Fools Fall in Love?"/"The End of the World"	-
1965	"Here I Am" / "Did He Call Today Mama?"	-
1965	"You're No Good" / "Don't Come Running Back to Me"	-
1966	"Eddie My Love"/"I Only Have Eyes for You"	-
1966	"He's a Rebel" / "Talk About Love"	-
1970	"All Kinds of Everything"/"In Your World"	28
1972	"To the Sun"/"Out of My Mind"	-
1973	"Now I'm Stuck on You" / "I'm Not Ready"	95
1974	"Curly Headed Rooster" / "To the Sun"	-
