= The Siren Six! =

American rock band

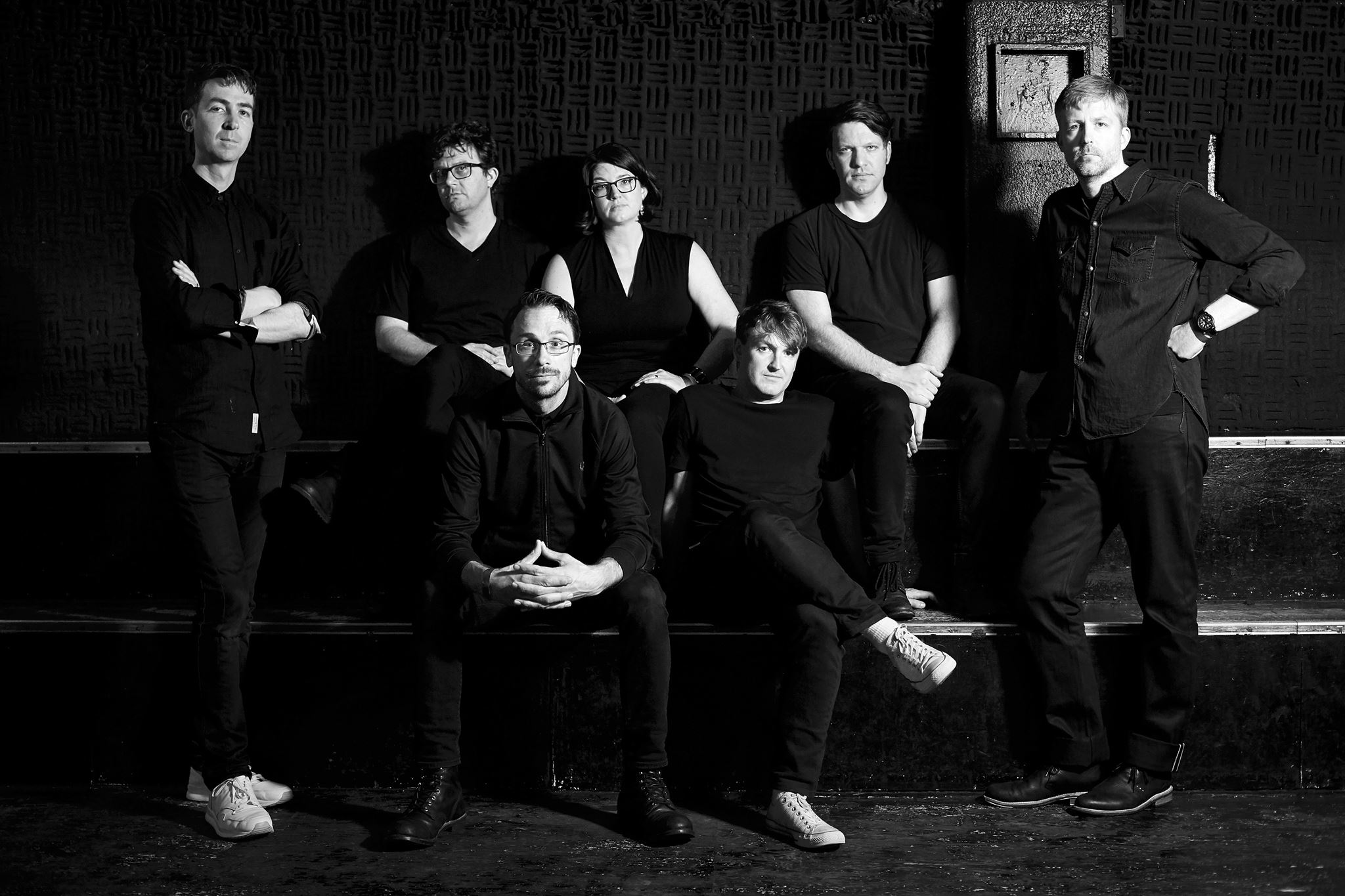
- 20 year anniversary reunion in 2017; From left to right: Conrad, Staniszewski, McIntosh, Breen, Reineck, Bott, Matheny .

Background information
- Origin: Minneapolis, Minnesota, United States
- Genres: Ska, alternative rock, indie rock
- Years active: 1994-2000, 2017-2018
- Labels: Jumpstart, Kingpin

The Siren Six! was an American rock band formed in Minneapolis, Minnesota, who were active from 1994 to 2000. The band reunited in Minneapolis in 2017 for their first show in 20 years and continued performing into 2018 before queitly disbanding again shortly after.

== Biography ==
The Siren Six! initially formed under the name Stinkfish in Minneapolis around 1994, consisting of vocalist/guitarist Nate Bott, keyboardist Frank Staniszewski, drummer Jeff Conrad, bassist Tim Resudek, trombonist Kevin Matheny and saxophonist John Reineck. After building up a loyal following on the Midwest ska circuit, Stinkfish released their sole LP ...Does It Again in 1995 on the band's self-run label Mr. White Records. Shortly afterwards, Resudek left the band, and, following the addition of Jacy McIntosh, Stinkfish officially changed their name to The Siren Six!.

Signing to Minneapolis-based ska label Kingpin Records, home to such bands as Animal Chin and The Pacers, The Siren Six! recorded their debut album The Voice With a Built-In Promise in 1996. Citing the Pixies, Elvis Costello, The Jam and The Selecter among their influences, The Siren Six!'s music stood in contrast to the then-popular ska punk sound, combining 2-Tone-style ska with heavy indie rock and Mod influences and a focus on introspective lyricism, a combination Kingpin Records marketed the band with as "2tone/mod/emoska".

Following a national tour with Slow Gherkin, the band recorded their follow-up album, the EP Young and Professional, in early 1998. Unlike the overtly ska-based sound of their debut, Young and Professional featured a more prominent focus on rock and power pop, though still retained a distinct ska influence. In the summer of 1999, The Siren Six! relocated to Los Angeles, California in the hopes of landing a major record deal. However, heightened tensions within the band eventually led to their break-up the following year.

Since their disbandment, members of The Siren Six! have moved on to numerous musical projects. Bott and Staniszewski went on to play in the Los Angeles-based pop rock band Big City Rock from 2001 to 2008, before forming another group called The Remainers in 2009. Jeff Conrad was also a member of Big City Rock from 2001 to 2003, when he left to replace Jason Schwartzman in Phantom Planet. Since 2003, Reineck has fronted the New York indie rock band Soft, while McIntosh has played in several national touring bands in the Twin Cities from 2000-2005 including End Transmission, Askeleton and Ela, before forming his current project THEMES in 2005. McIntosh also recently played with The Velvet Teen.

In 2007, Conrad released a trailer on his YouTube account for a prospective Siren Six! documentary entitled Six Is One, chronicling the band's move from Minneapolis to Los Angeles. On June 26, 2018, the 47-minute documentary was released for free on YouTube.

In May 2017, The Siren Six! announced a "One Night Only" reunion show in Minneapolis at The 7th Street Entry on August 26, 2017, to support the 20th Anniversary Re-releases of the band's previous catalogue on Jump Start Records. The show quickly sold out, so another show was added earlier the same evening. Shortly after, the band announced two additional shows in California in late August, one in San Francisco and another in Pomona, both to be supported by Slow Gherkin.

== Discography ==
As Stinkfish

- ...Does It Again (1995, Mr. White Records)

As The Siren Six!

- The Voice With a Built-In Promise (1996, Kingpin Records) (2017, Jumpstart Records)
- Young and Professional EP (Oct. 13, 1998, Kingpin Records) (2017, Jumpstart Records)

Non-album tracks

- 1999 - The Radiolistener Remixes - "You Can Get It If You Really Want" (Jimmy Cliff)
- 1999 - Where Is My Mind? A Tribute to the Pixies - "The Holiday Song" (Black Francis)

== Band members ==
- Nate Bott - vocals, guitar
- Frank Staniszewski - keyboards
- Jeff Conrad - drums
- John Reineck - saxophone, vocals
- Jacy McIntosh - bass guitar
- Mara Breen - trombone, vocals
- Kevin Matheny - trombone, vocals

Former members

- Jeremy Tappero - bass guitar
- Tim Resudek - bass guitar (Stinkfish)
