= Phantom Planet (album) =

Studio album by Phantom Planet
- Released: January 6, 2004
- Recorded: Tarbox Road Studios, Cassadga, New York
- Genre: Alternative rock, garage rock, shoegaze
- Length: 35:32
- Label: Epic
- Producer: Dave Fridmann

Phantom Planet chronology
Live at The Troubadour (2003)	Phantom Planet (2004)	Bootleg! Live 2004 (2004)

Singles from Phantom Planet
- 1. "Big Brat" Released: October 21, 2003

Professional ratings
Review scores
Source	Rating
AllMusic	3.5/5 stars
Pitchfork	7.3/10
Rolling Stone	3/5 stars
Spin	6/10

Phantom Planet is the self-titled third studio album by the American rock band Phantom Planet, released on January 6, 2004. The album marked a change in the band's sound, shifting from radio-friendly pop rock to garage rock, comparable to the sound of the Strokes. Produced by Dave Fridmann, it is their first album to feature drummer Jeff Conrad (formerly of The Siren Six! and Big City Rock).

During the recording of the album, drummer and co-founder Jason Schwartzman left the band to pursue his acting career.

The music video for album's single, "Big Brat" cuts between scenes of an urban performance of the song to the band shooting a low budget zombie film in the relative location. The actual zombie film being shot was used as an alternate music video for the song available to fans on the band's website.

== Recording and production ==
The album was Phantom Planet's first without drummer Jason Schwartzman, who announced midway through the sessions that he was leaving to pursue acting full-time. "He finally made the adult decision between the two sides of him," Greenwald said of his friend, with whom he co-founded the group at age thirteen. "It was a little strange at first, but there's no bad blood. We're still best friends." Schwartzman, the star of several films, including Rushmore, The Darjeeling Limited, Funny People, and television shows like Bored to Death, can be heard on half the album's tracks, while the rest feature new drummer Jeff Conrad.

== Songs ==
The song "By the Bed" is about Alex's grandmother, and what she told him on her deathbed, and the song "Jabberjaw" deals with anger and frustration.

Alex Greenwald commented on "Jabberjaw" in Nylon magazine:

There are references to this one girl- that's what "Jabberjaw" is about. She wouldn't stop complaining about how a guest spot on a TV show was going to ruin her and how she didn't want to turn out like me- credibility ruined by being in a Gap commercial. It infuriated me. And I drove home livid and wrote an angry song about it.

== Track listing ==
All tracks are written by Alex Greenwald, except "You're Not Welcome Here" composed by Greenwald and Jason Schwartzman.

Phantom Planet track listing
No.	Title	Length
1.	"The Happy Ending"	3:20
2.	"Badd Business"	2:18
3.	"Big Brat"	3:21
4.	"1st Things 1st"	2:53
5.	"Making a Killing"	2:43
6.	"You're Not Welcome Here"	3:30
7.	"By the Bed"	3:41
8.	"Knowitall"	4:03
9.	"Jabberjaw"	3:16
10.	"After Hours"	2:46
11.	"The Meantime"	3:43
Total length:		35:32

Japanese bonus track
No.	Title	Length
12.	"The Living Dead" (originally appeared on Stubbs the Zombie: The Soundtrack)	3:26
13.	"Stiffs" (live)	2:23

== Personnel ==
=== Musicians ===
Phantom Planet

- Alex Greenwald – lead vocals, guitar, bass
- Sam Farrar – bass guitar, backing vocals, guitar, drums (tracks 3 and 8)
- Jacques Brautbar – rhythm guitar, bass, backing vocals
- Darren Robinson – lead guitar
- Jason Schwartzman – drums (tracks 1, 2, 4, 6, 7 and 9)
- Jeff Conrad – drums (tracks 5, 10 and 11)

Additional musicians

- Dean Keller – saxophone on "Big Brat" and "You're Not Welcome Here"
- Bill Racine – additional saxophone on "Big Brat"

=== Production ===
- Dave Fridmann – producer
- Rob Bronco – artwork
- Skullhead & Clark, Brandy Flower – artwork
- Mike Myerburg – photography

== Charts ==
Chart performance for Phantom Planet
Chart (2004)	Peak position
Australian Albums (ARIA)	122
US Billboard 200	95
