= Blackblack =

American-British rock band (2004–2008)

BlackBlack
- Origin: Los Angeles, California, United States
- Genres: Pop; indie rock
- Years active: 2004–2008
- Label: None
- Past members: Diva Dompe; Lola Dompe; Alex Greenwald
- Website: BlackBlack

BlackBlack was an American-British rock band from Los Angeles, California, consisting of Diva Dompe (vocals/bass), Lola Dompe (drums), and Clark Schädelkopf (guitar).

== Background ==
Diva Dompe started the band in 2004 with her sister Lola and then-boyfriend Alex Greenwald, who performed as his alter-ego "Clark Schädelkopf" in the context of the band. Schädelkopf means "skullhead" in German. The Dompe sisters are both daughters of former Bauhaus drummer Kevin Haskins.

They have channeled their fantastical and sci-fi leanings into their shows. Prepping for past gigs included dressing as if they were starring in the Ice Capades, crafting massive Native American headdresses, and making vats of theatrical blood in the Dompe family kitchen for a Carrie-themed summertime barbecue at The Echo in Echo Park.

Many people believed that they got their name from the caffeinated Japanese gum, BlackBlack, but Clark has said that the meaning is "blacker than black."

Some criticized BlackBlack because they thought that it was a random side project for the already successful Alex Greenwald, but they have steadily gained recognition, especially in Los Angeles and Japan.

The band came under criticism in the late 2000's for reportedly performing in blackface, although the band claims that they painted their skin to perform as 'shadows' and didn't intend to be racially offensive.

The band, especially the Dompe sisters, are often noted for their quirky and constantly shifting fashion choices, going so far as to appear on the front page of the Urban Outfitters website.

== Music ==
BlackBlack has a moody, gloomy sound, reminiscent of The Velvet Underground and Joy Division. Clark Schädelkopf tells ElleGirl "we're not Goth, but we do have to fight it."

Some of their musical influences consist of contemporary bands such as Deerhoof, Lightning Bolt and Blonde Redhead. A staple and likely the most commented on feature of the band's live shows is their cover of the Misfits song "Skulls".

They have toured Japan in the summer of 2006 sponsored by X-Girl. In January 2007 they supported Deerhoof during their west coast tour.

Diva and Lola have appeared in music videos for the electronic band M83.

== Discography ==
BlackBlack have released two independent EPs as well as a full-length album in Japan which combines the two EPs. The album had a limited vinyl release in 2012.

=== Albums ===
- Blackblack - Mathom Records – 23 August 2006

=== Singles and EPs ===
- Blackblack EP 1 - 16 June 2005
1. "Royal Dragon"
2. "Sophia"
3. "Honey In Your Ears"
4. "Firefly"
5. "I Wish I Were A Scientist"
6. "Algorythyx and Gurantaxtaxq"
- Blackblack EP 2 - 2006
1. "Emerald Forest"
2. "Ogre Mountain"
3. "The Energy Song"
4. "The Most! The Best! The Greatest! Forever!"
5. "The Long Boat"
6. "Skulls" – cover song of the Misfits
7. "We, The Grimlocks"
- "Waiting For Magic" 2009 Single

=== Appearances ===
- Perfect As Cats a tribute to The Cure on Manimal Vinyl Records Oct 2008
