= The Guest (album) =

Studio album by Phantom Planet
- Released: February 26, 2002
- Recorded: 1999–2001
- Studio: Sunset Sound Factory, Hollywood, California, mastered at Gateway Mastering
- Genre: Alternative rock; pop rock; power pop
- Length: 42:56; 57:23 (reissue)
- Label: Epic
- Producer: Mitchell Froom; Tchad Blake

Phantom Planet chronology
Polaroid (1999)	The Guest (2002)	Live at The Troubadour (2003)

Singles from The Guest
- 1. "Hey Now Girl" Released: 2001; 2. "California" Released: January 28, 2002; 3. "Always On My Mind" Released: November 19, 2002; 4. "Lonely Day" Released: December 24, 2002

Professional ratings
Review scores
Source	Rating
AllMusic	4/5 stars
Pitchfork	7.3/10
Rolling Stone	2.5/5 stars

The Guest (originally titled Phantom Planet Was Here) is the second studio album by American rock band Phantom Planet, released on February 26, 2002 by Epic Records. It was reissued in November 2003 with four additional bonus tracks, music videos, photos, and lyrics scanned from the notebook in which the album was originally written.

The album produced the band's breakthrough hit, "California", which became the theme song to the Fox TV series, The O.C., in August 2003. Its music video aired on MTV2 in mid-2002.

The track "Lonely Day" is also featured on the Smallville and Laguna Beach soundtracks.

The figure seen running across the photo on the album cover is Australian musician Ben Lee.

== Track listing ==
All tracks are written by Alex Greenwald, except where noted.

The Guest track listing
No.	Title	Writer(s)	Length
1.	"California"	Greenwald, Jason Schwartzman, Joseph Meyer, B.G. De Sylva	3:14
2.	"Always On My Mind"		3:27
3.	"Lonely Day"	Greenwald, Schwartzman	3:40
4.	"One Ray of Sunlight"		4:43
5.	"Anthem"		4:21
6.	"In Our Darkest Hour"	Greenwald, Adam Schlesinger	3:02
7.	"Turn, Smile, Shift, Repeat"		5:22
8.	"Hey Now Girl"		2:35
9.	"Nobody's Fault"		3:23
10.	"All Over Again"	Jacques Brautbar, Greenwald, Schwartzman	4:19
11.	"Wishing Well"		4:19
12.	"Something Is Wrong"		4:21
Total length:			42:56

Bonus tracks on 2003 remastered version
No.	Title	Writer(s)	Length
13.	"California" (demo)	Greenwald, Schwartzman	3:16
14.	"Always On My Mind" (London version)		3:22
15.	"The Guest" (live at the Troubadour)	Greenwald, Brautbar, Sam Farrar, Darren Robinson, Schwartzman	3:43
16.	"This Is What You Get" (demo)		4:08
Total length:			57:23

Bonus disc
No.	Title	Writer(s)	Length
13.	"The Guest" (demo)	Greenwald, Brautbar, Farrar, Robinson, Schwartzman	3:44
14.	"Do the Panic" (live)	Greenwald, Schwartzman	3:03
15.	"California" (live)	Greenwald, Schwartzman	3:19

== Personnel ==
Phantom Planet

- Alex Greenwald – lead vocals, guitar, keyboards
- Sam Farrar – bass, backing vocals
- Jacques Brautbar – guitar, keyboards, backing vocals
- Darren Robinson – guitar
- Jason Schwartzman – drums

Additional musicians

- Adam Schlesinger – lyrics on "In Our Darkest Hour"

=== Production ===
- Tchad Blake – production, recording, mixing
- Jacquie Blake – engineering
- Bob Ludwig – mastering
- Mitchell Froom – production
- Detourists – programming

== Charts ==
Chart performance for The Guest
Chart (2002)	Peak position
Australian Albums (ARIA)	133
Austrian Albums (Ö3 Austria)	42
US Billboard 200	133
