= California (Phantom Planet song) =

2002 single by Phantom Planet

Single by Phantom Planet

from the album The Guest
- Released: January 28, 2002
- Genre: Alternative rock; indie rock
- Length: 3:14 (album version); 3:17 (demo version)
- Label: Epic; Daylight
- Songwriters: Jason Schwartzman; Joseph Meyer; B.G. De Sylva
- Producers: Mitchell Froom; Tchad Blake

Phantom Planet singles chronology
"Hey Now Girl" (2001)	"California" (2002)	"Always on My Mind" (2002)

Music video
- "California" on YouTube

"California" is a song by American rock band Phantom Planet. It was released as a single from their second album The Guest in 2002. The song is about driving on U.S. Route 101, traveling to see a concert. Both the song and the band received major attention when it became the theme song on the Fox television show The O.C., and it soon became a top-10 hit in Austria, Ireland, Italy, and the United Kingdom.

== Song information ==
The estates of Al Jolson and his songwriting team are co-credited for "California", presumably because the title and chorus bear strong resemblances to his own "California, Here I Come". Some websites refer to the Phantom Planet song as a cover of the Jolson tune. Some parts of the song, particularly the piano solos at the beginning and end, are similar to the Jolson song, but still contain several differences in melody. It also bears some thematic and melodic resemblance to Joni Mitchell's "California" from her 1971 album Blue.

The song was re-recorded in 2005 by Phantom Planet and re-released as "California 2005", a much mellower version of the song than the original. "California 2005" had its debut in the second episode of The O.C.'s third season, and is featured on Music from the OC: MX-5. Although normally this version of the song runs as the title song for The O.C., it was switched out for the Mates of State's cover version in a special episode where everything in the show took place in an alternate universe, hence a different song for the title sequence.

The band released another re-recording of the song as a non-album single in May 2023 to capitalize on nostalgia for The O.C..

== Music video ==
The music video for "California" was directed by Roman Coppola, the cousin of the band's then-drummer Jason Schwartzman who co-wrote the song, and documents the band on tour, intercut with footage of the song dubbed over live performances of it at various tour stops. Coppola would later work with the band again months later on the music video for "Lonely Day" (also from The Guest), the band's last single and video with Schwartzman before he left the band in mid-2003 to focus on his acting career.

== Track listings ==
EP

No.	Title	Length
1.	"California" (Tchad Blake Mix)	3:14
2.	"Always on My Mind" (London Version)	3:16
3.	"The Living Dead"	3:28
4.	"Stiffs"	2:37
5.	"California" (Demo)	3:15

Single

No.	Title	Length
1.	"California" (Jack Joseph Puig Mix)	3:18
2.	"The Guest"	3:44
3.	"Do the Panic" (Live)	3:03
4.	"California" (Live)	3:19

== Charts ==
=== Weekly charts ===
2002 weekly chart performance for "California"
Chart (2002)	Peak position
Australia (ARIA)	115
UK Singles (Official Charts)	83
US Alternative Airplay (Billboard)	35

2004–2005 weekly chart performance for "California"
Chart (2004–2005)	Peak position
Austria (Ö3 Austria Top 40)	3
Germany (GfK)	13
Ireland (IRMA)	10
Italy (FIMI)	2
Scottish Singles Sales (Official Charts)	7
Switzerland (Schweizer Hitparade)	17
UK Singles (Official Charts)	9

=== Year-end charts ===
2004 year-end chart performance for "California"
Chart (2004)	Position
Italy (FIMI)	50

2005 year-end chart performance for "California"
Chart (2005)	Position
Austria (Ö3 Austria Top 40)	30
Europe (Eurochart Hot 100)	96
Germany (Media Control GfK)	57
UK Singles (OCC)	90

== Certifications ==
Certifications and sales for "California"
Region	Certification	Certified units/sales
United Kingdom (BPI)	Gold	400,000^{‡}
United States (RIAA)	Gold	500,000^{^}
^{^} Shipments figures based on certification alone.^{‡} Sales+streaming figures based on certification alone.

== Release history ==
Release dates and formats for "California"
Region	Date	Format(s)	Label(s)	Ref.
United States	January 28, 2002	Alternative; triple-A radio	Epic; Daylight	
United States	March 18, 2002	Hot adult contemporary radio	Epic; Daylight	
United States	April 29, 2002	Contemporary hit radio	Epic; Daylight	
United Kingdom	May 6, 2002	7-inch vinyl; CD	Epic; Daylight	
Australia	May 20, 2002	CD	Epic; Daylight	
United Kingdom (re-release)	March 7, 2005	CD	Epic; Daylight	
