= Jacques Brautbar =

American photographer and musician (born 1979)

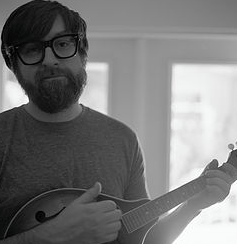
- Brautbar in 2016
- Born: March 14, 1979 (age 47); Los Angeles, California, U.S.
- Occupations: Composer; Musician; Photographer
- Years active: 1994–present

Jacques Brautbar (born March 14, 1979) is an American composer, musician, and photographer, formerly of rock band Phantom Planet. While with the band, he collaborated on the song "California", which was the theme song to the show The O.C.

== Biography ==
Brautbar was born in Los Angeles on March 14, 1979. He began his career in music as founder, guitarist, arranger, and songwriter for Phantom Planet. While a full-time band member, he collaborated on three singles: "Lonely Day," "Big Brat," and "California" which was the theme song to the show The O.C. He also accompanied the band on their American, European, and World tours, as well as their frequent television performances on The Tonight Show with Jay Leno, Late Night with Conan O’Brien, and Late Show with David Letterman. He left the band in 2004.

After years with Phantom Planet, he signed a publishing deal with Sony/ATV Publishing, penning and producing hundreds of songs— from hip-hop to pop to country— alongside such talents as Julia Michaels and Rachel Platten, and landing dozens of high-profile syncs for companies like NBC, Ferrero Rocher, and Apple. During this time, he attended USC Thornton School of Music to complete his music degree. After graduating from the program, Brautbar was selected to attend the Sundance Institute's Composer Lab at Skywalker Ranch, and procured an additional music position for the HBO series, Animals. Brautbar has since worked as an additional writer for Netflix' Insatiable, and Amazon's Lorena and Absentia.

In 2012, he co-produced and co-wrote the album Beneath The Noise for Jasmine Ash with former Phantom Planet bandmate Sam Farrar.

In 2016, Brautbar attended Sundance with the documentary Bad Reputation and was slated to appear at South by Southwest in 2020 with his film For Madmen Only.

In 2024, Brautbar returned to SXSW with his score for Bob Trevino Likes It. The film won both the Narrative Audience and Narrative Jury Awards at the festival.

== Filmography ==
- Without a Home (2009)
- Random Acts of Violence (2013)
- Suitable (2017)
- The Fringes (2018)
- Ravage (2019)
- Kings of Beer (2019)
- Team Marco (2019)
- For Madmen Only: The Stories of Del Close (2020)
- Wicked Games (2021)
- Supercool (2021)
- Phobias (2021)
- Black as Night (2021)
- Lovely Jackson (2022)
- It Ain't Over (2022)
- Give Me an A (2022)
- Devil's Workshop (2022)
- A Rose for Her Grave: The Randy Roth Story (2023)
- Thine Ears Shall Bleed (2023)
- Skywalkers: A Love Story (2024)
- How to Come Alive With Norman Mailer (2024)
- Bob Trevino Likes It (2024)
- The Astronaut (2025)
- The Big Cheese (2025)
- Stop! That! Train! (2026)
