= Big City Rock =

American pop rock band (2001–2008)

- Origin: Los Angeles, California United States
- Genres: Rock, power pop
- Years active: 2001–2008
- Label: Atlantic
- Past members: Nate Bott; Frank Staniszewski; Jason Lautenschleger; Kaumyar; Timothy Resudek; Andrew Barr; Jeff Conrad

Big City Rock was an American pop rock band based in Los Angeles, California, United States, who were signed to Atlantic Records. Their music type is self-described as "energetic, anthemic pop" with "an uplifting sound", with keyboards, guitar, and drums. Due to shifts in the band's membership, the remaining members of the group created a new band called The Remainers.

== History ==
Tim Resudek, Frank Staniszewski, Jeff Conrad and Nate Bott, who grew up together in Madison, Wisconsin started a ska-punk band in eighth grade named Stinkfish. Bott, Conrad and Staniszewski later started another band, The Siren Six!, when they moved to Minneapolis, Minnesota. Siren Six! broke up in 2000 after they moved to California to try to get signed to a music label. Big City Rock started when Resudek was asked to join Staniszewski, Conrad and Bott in Los Angeles, California. In 2003, drummer Jeff Conrad left to join the band Phantom Planet, and was replaced by Kaumyar. In March 2004 guitarist Andy Barr, who had played with Kaumyar before, joined also in 2004. Signed to Atlantic in late 2004 after having opened for Gratitude, Rooney, Phoenix, and Maroon 5, in 2005, the band relocated to New York City to record their debut album at Stratosphere Studios.

Big City Rock's debut album was released on Atlantic Records in March 2006 and generated critical acclaim. Blender magazine gave the album 3.5 stars proclaiming it "... like the Killers without the self-consciousness, powered by exquisitely engineered hooks that are nearly impossible to forget." And placing the song "All of the Above" at the number 10 slot of their annual Top 100 Singles chart.

Throughout 2006, Big City Rock toured across the country, supporting acts like Morningwood, Rock Kills Kid, Under The Influence of Giants, Sugarcult, Head Automatica, Diamond Nights, The Rocket Summer, Jason Mraz, and The Click Five.

In 2008, Big City Rock underwent personnel changes and began writing their follow-up album to Big City Rock.

In August 2009, Big City Rock's remaining members created a new band with a new Facebook page, entitled The Remainers.

== Final band members ==
- Nate Bott - Vocals, guitar
- Frank Staniszewski - keyboards, vocals
- Jason Lautenschleger - bass guitar
- Kaumyar - drums, percussion

=== Former members ===
- Timothy Resudek - bass
- Andrew Barr - guitars
- Jeff Conrad - drums (later of Phantom Planet)

== Discography ==
- Big City Rock (2003)
  1. "Do You Know What You Want"
  2. "Here for Each Other"
  3. "Human"
  4. "Only If You Want Me To"
  5. "Better Place"
- Big City Rock (2004)
  1. "Do You Know What You Want"
  2. "Human"
  3. "Here for Each Other"
  4. "Better Place"
  5. "All the Way [Acoustic]"
  6. "Sink"
  7. "They Won't Mind"
  8. "Different Face"
- Big City Rock (2006)
  1. "Sink"
  2. "All of the Above"
  3. "As Soon As I Find Out"
  4. "I Believe In You"
  5. "Human"
  6. "Kind"
  7. "Better Place"
  8. "Shelter"
  9. "They Won't Mind"
  10. "Touch The Horizon"

== Trivia ==
- The band recorded a cover of the song "Black Betty" for the 2007 film TMNT.
- The band also recorded a cover of Silent Night during the 2007 holiday season and released it as a single.
- "All of the Above" from Big City Rock was featured on the 2006 Bionicle: Free the Band website, as well as songs from Undertones, Over It, Carbon Leaf, and a few others.
- "Human" was used in the 2006 Warren Miller Movie "Off The Grid" - It was used in a section about 2 skiers (Kevin Bramble and Monte Meier) with disabilities (one paralyzed from the waist down, and one missing one leg) Heliskiing in the Alaskan Cugache mountain range.

== Equipment ==
Frank Staniszewski uses a Nord Lead 2 synth, MicroKORG and Yamaha S90 as well as using Hammond B3 organs and various grand pianos in the studio.

Nate Bott uses Fender Deville amplifiers with no effects pedals. He uses Fender Stratocaster and Fender Jaguar guitars.

Jason Lautenschleger uses Ampeg amplifiers and Ampeg cabinets and plays Fender Precision and Music Man Stingray basses

Kaumyar plays Pearl Drums and Zildjian cymbals with the exception of his Paiste Hi-Hats.
