= Sam Farrar =

American musician and producer (born 1978)

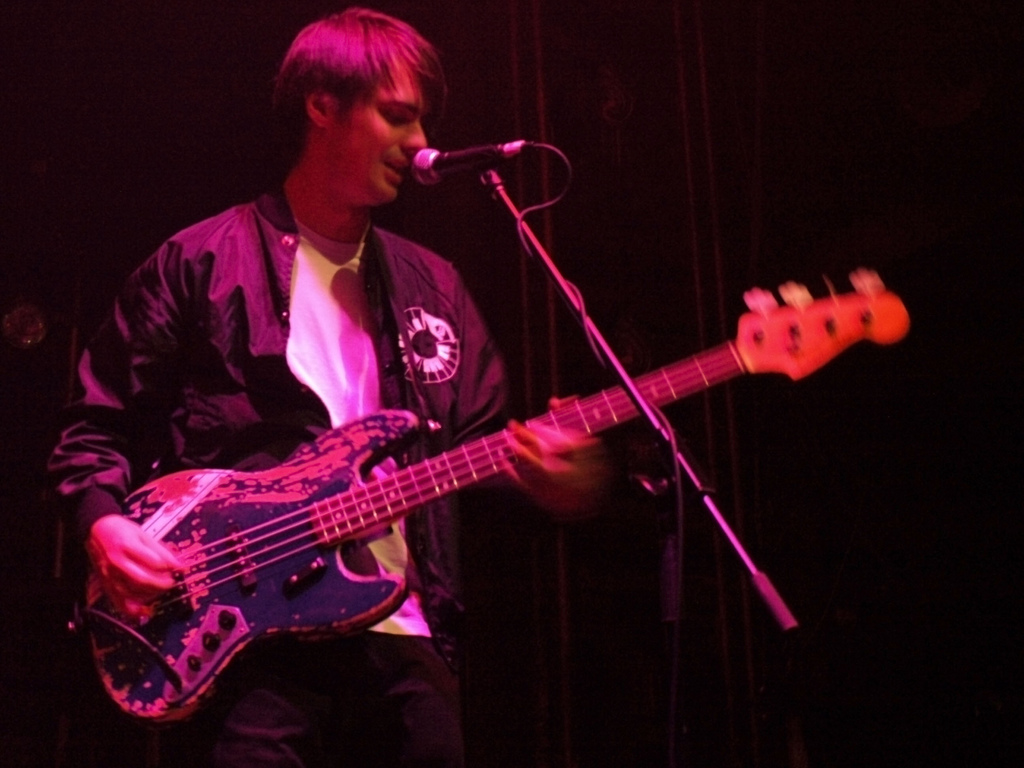
- Farrar performing with Phantom Planet in October 2008
- Born: Sam John Farrar; June 29, 1978 (age 48); Los Angeles, California, U.S.
- Occupations: Guitarist; record producer
- Spouse: Stephanie Eitel (m. 2007)
- Children: 2
- Parents: John Farrar (father); Pat Carroll (mother)
- Musical career
- Genres: Pop
- Instruments: Bass; keyboards; guitar; percussion; sampler; vocals
- Years active: 1994–present
- Labels: Epic; Fueled by Ramen
- Member of: Phantom Planet; Maroon 5
- Formerly of: Operation Aloha; Bubble and Strife
- Website: samfarrar.com

Sam John Farrar (born June 29, 1978) is an American musician who is the primary bass guitarist for the pop band Maroon 5, having joined the band in 2016. A frequent collaborator with the band since the 1990s, he joined as a touring member in 2012 and was promoted to bass guitarist in 2020. He has also been the bassist for the rock band Phantom Planet since their formation in 1994.

== Career ==
=== 1994–2012: Phantom Planet and other side projects ===
Farrar is the bass guitar player for the American rock band Phantom Planet. He also joined the band Operation Aloha with members of Gomez and Maroon 5. He and his wife, Stephanie, have started their own music project, called Bubble and Strife.

=== 2012–present: Maroon 5 ===
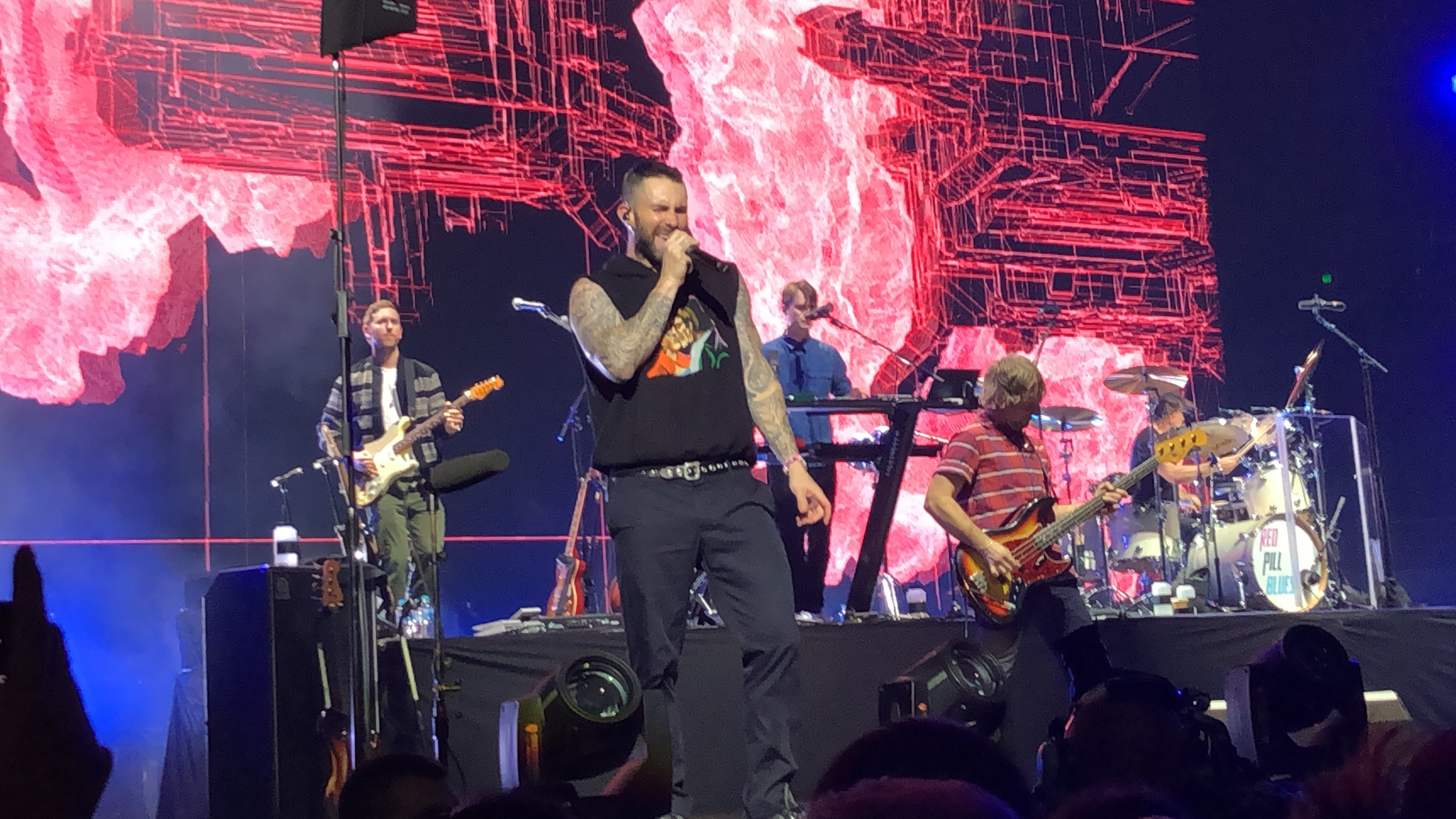
Farrar (back; left) performing with Maroon 5 in Sydney, Australia in February 2019

In 2012, Farrar became a touring member of Maroon 5, playing various instruments, including guitars, occasional bass guitar, percussion and additional keyboards, singing backing vocals and providing samples and other special effects (using the MPC).

A longtime collaborator of the band, he co-wrote and co-produced a few of the band's songs on almost all of their studio albums and also remixed one of their songs, which is called "Woman", on Call and Response: The Remix Album, released in 2008. On August 31, 2012 – during a show in Argentina on the Overexposed Tour – Farrar filled-in for Mickey Madden on the bass guitar for the first time since 2001. He subsequently filled-in for Madden on the next few shows of the tour.

After touring with the band for the next couple of years, Farrar was named an official member in late 2017, with the release of Red Pill Blues. He replaced Madden as bassist in 2020.

== Personal life ==
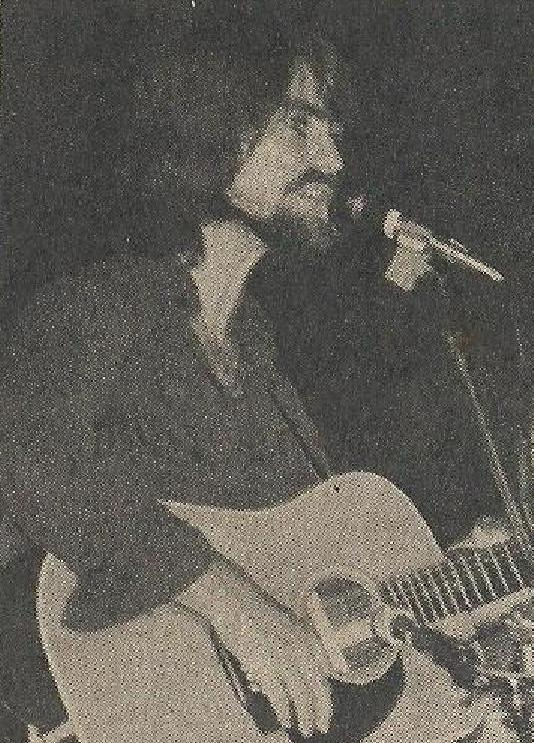
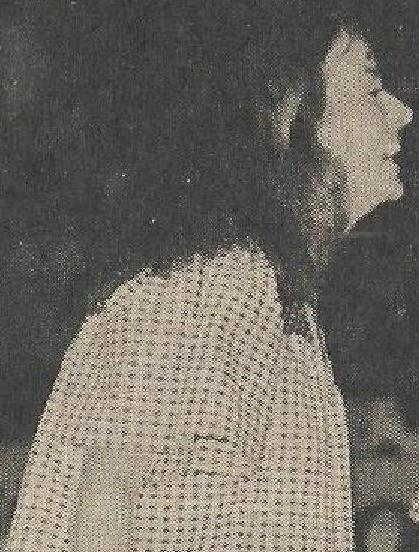
Farrar's parents, John Farrar (left) and Pat Carroll (right) performing in 1972

Farrar was born in Los Angeles, California, to Australian parents. His father, John Farrar, was a member of The Shadows and also carved a successful songwriting career, penning many of Olivia Newton-John's big hits as well as producing nearly every one of her albums during her most successful years. His mother, Pat Carroll, was a successful Australian pop singer in the 1960s. He attended The Buckley School.

Farrar married Stephanie Eitel in 2007, formerly a member of the band Agent Sparks. Their daughter was born in 2009, and their son in 2014. He is the older brother of musician, composer and producer Max Farrar, who is the keyboardist and guitarist of the rock band Azura, and whose work also ranges from The Script to Lewis Capaldi.

== Discography ==
With Hanson

- Underneath (2004)

With Operation Aloha

- Operation Aloha (2009)

With Sara Bareilles

- Kaleidoscope Heart (2010)
- Once Upon Another Time (EP) (2012)

With Bubble and Strife

- My Lifetime for Blondes (EP) (2011)

With Jasmine Ash

- Beneath the Noise (2012)

With John Travolta and Olivia Newton-John

- This Christmas (2012)

With Oh Land

- Wish Bone (2013)

With Tony Lucca

- With the Whole World Watching (2013)

With Rozzi Crane

- Rozzi Crane (EP) (2013)
- Space (EP) (2015)
- Time (EP) (2015)

With Shoffy

- Lenses (2018)
- Cool Again (2020)

With Andy Grammer

- Naive (2019)

With Yuna

- Rogue (2019)

With SuperM

- Super One (2020)

With Duncan Laurence

- Small Town Boy (2020)

With Band of Horses

- Things Are Great (2022)

With Mandy Moore

- In Real Life (2022)

=== Maroon 5 ===
As an outside collaborator

- Songs About Jane (2002) – programming ("She Will Be Loved")
- It Won't Be Soon Before Long (2007) – production
- Call and Response: The Remix Album (2008) – remix of a song ("Woman")
- Hands All Over (2010) – songwriting ("Misery", "Stutter", "Don't Know Nothing", "Hands All Over" and "How")
- Songs About Jane: 10th Anniversary Edition (2012) – producing

As a touring member

- Overexposed (2012) – production and songwriting ("Ladykiller", "Fortune Teller" and "Tickets"), backing vocals, programming
- V (2014) – backing vocals ("Unkiss Me" and "This Summer" – the latter song is from the 2015 re-release of V), programming

As an official member

- Red Pill Blues (2017) – producing, keyboards, bass guitar, synthesizer, samples, lead and rhythm guitar, programming, backing vocals
- Jordi (2021) – producing, keyboards, bass guitar, synthesizer, samples, lead and rhythm guitar, programming, backing vocals
- Love Is Like (2025) – bass; additional keyboards; percussion; programming; co-producer; additional producer; engineering

=== Phantom Planet ===
- Phantom Planet Is Missing (1998)
- The Guest (2002)
- Phantom Planet (2004)
- Raise the Dead (2008)
- Devastator (2020)

== Remixes ==
2008

- "Woman" – Maroon 5 (Sam Farrar Remix)

2010

- "Unspoken" – Weezer (Sam Farrar Remix)
