= Phantom Planet =

American rock band

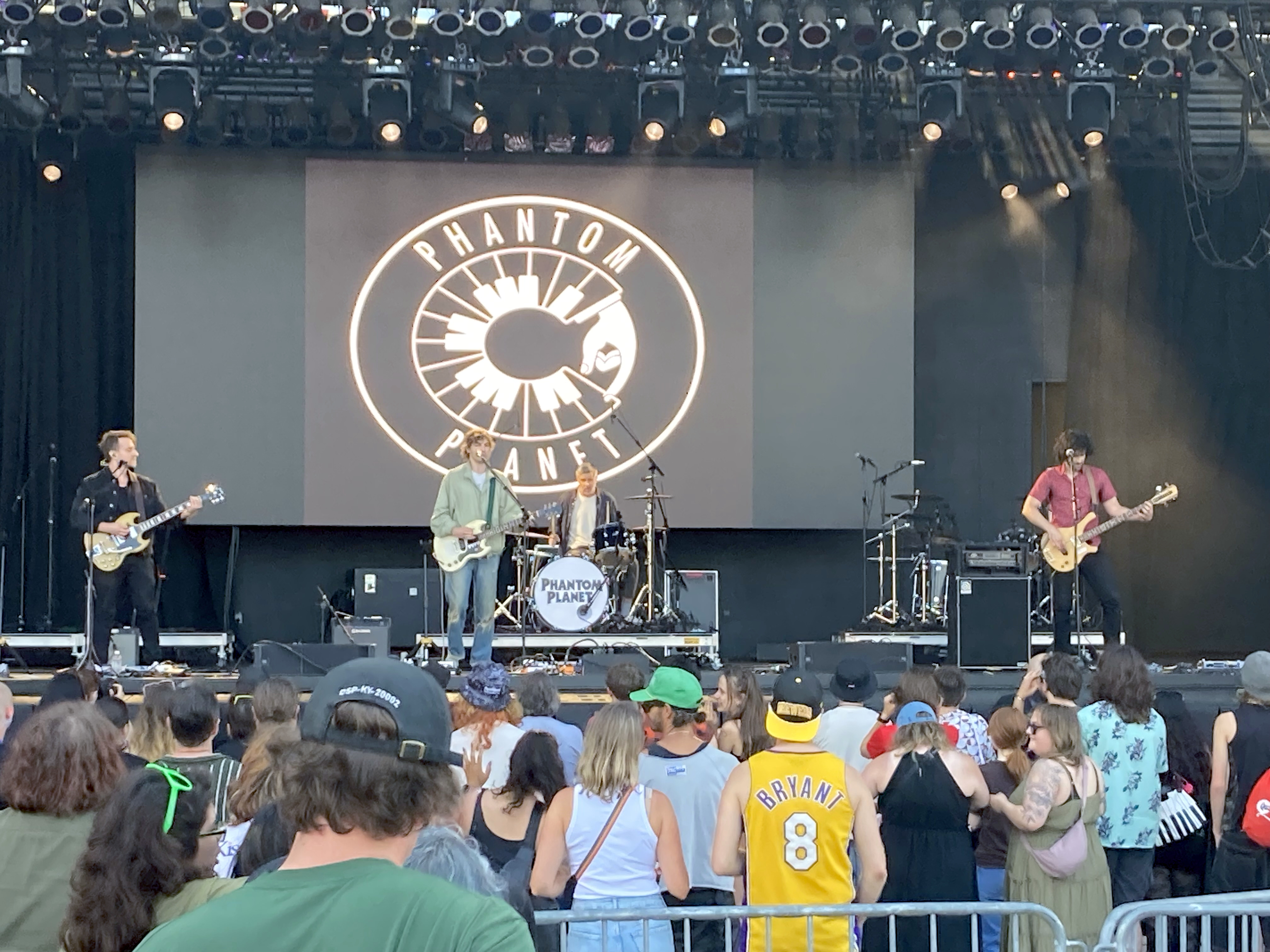
- Phantom Planet performing at Summerfest 2025. From left to right: Lead guitarist Darren Robinson, frontman/rhythm guitarist Alex Greenwald, drummer Andrew Parker, and substitute bassist Chris Lorentz.

Background information
- Also known as: Alex Greenwald & Phriends (2013)
- Origin: Los Angeles, California, U.S.
- Genres: Alternative rock; garage rock; pop rock; power pop
- Years active: 1994–2008; 2011–2013; 2019–present
- Labels: Fueled by Ramen; Daylight; Epic; MCA; Geffen; Interscope; Gong
- Spinoffs: Blackblack; Coconut Records; Phases; Operation Aloha; Mark Ronson & The Business Intl.; Bubble and Strife; Twin Terrors; Dead Honcho; Vibe Mountain; Fist Fright
- Members: Alex Greenwald; Sam Farrar; Darren Robinson; Andrew Parker
- Past members: Jason Schwartzman; Jacques Brautbar; Jeff Conrad
- Website: phantompla.net

Phantom Planet is an American rock band from Los Angeles, California, formed in 1994. The band consists of Alex Greenwald (vocals, rhythm guitar), Darren Robinson (lead guitar), Sam Farrar (bass guitar), and Andrew Parker (drums). The band is best known for their track "California", which became the theme song for the TV series The O.C. Jason Schwartzman, now primarily an actor, was a founding member of the band, serving as the band's drummer until 2003.

On November 25, 2008, the band announced in a blog entry on their website that they were going on "hiatus" and would "not be playing any more live shows or making any new records, indefinitely." They played their last pre-hiatus show on December 12, 2008, in Los Angeles.

The band reunited for a series of one-off performances between 2011 and 2013, before permanently reuniting in 2019 and announcing that their hiatus was over.

== History ==
=== Early years and Phantom Planet Is Missing (1994–1999) ===
Phantom Planet was formed at a Los Angeles Pizza Hut in 1994 and was named after a 1961 B-movie called The Phantom Planet. While still in their teens, the group played frequently in and around the Hollywood area, finally catching the eye of Geffen Records executives. Phantom Planet signed with Geffen in 1997 and released their debut album, Phantom Planet Is Missing in 1998. The album did not impact any major charts. The album was followed by the release of the promotional single "So I Fall Again" in September 1998, which was also released to promote the soundtrack Sabrina the Teenage Witch: The Album.

=== The Guest and Phantom Planet (2002–2004) ===
Shortly thereafter Geffen Records folded into Universal as part of a major record industry merger, and within a few years Phantom Planet had signed with Epic Records. Charlotte Froom, the daughter of producer Mitchell Froom, caught the band's show at a time when the group was looking for a producer to record their second effort. Froom approached her father to produce the group, and after meeting with Phantom Planet, he agreed. Froom also brought in engineer Tchad Blake to work on the record.

The Guest was released in 2002. The group toured for almost 18 months both as a headliner and an opening act, and in late 2002 the band got the opportunity to open for one of their collective idols, Elvis Costello. The Guest got an extra boost when the record's song "California" was chosen as the theme song for the Fox Network's hit TV series The O.C.. As a result, the record was reissued in late 2003 with bonus tracks and a new cover.

The band's eponymous third album in 2004 marked a change in both the band's sound and lineup. Ditching their radio-friendly pop rock, the band moved towards a garage rock sound. Lead singer Alex Greenwald said it was an intentional choice: "I especially loved bands, like The Beatles, that changed with every single record they made. That's been our plan from the get-go. We want our records to be like experiments. We want to have fun with the music. People can hear when you're not having fun." In the middle of recording the album, founding member and drummer Jason Schwartzman abruptly left the band in May 2003 to focus on his acting career. He was replaced by former Siren Six! and Big City Rock drummer Jeff Conrad, who helped record the remainder of the album. Phantom Planet was released to mixed reviews from critics. Shortly after the album's release, co-guitarist Jacques Brautbar left the band to pursue a career in photography. The band performed "Big Brat", the album's lone single, on the Late Show with David Letterman.

=== Raise the Dead and hiatus (2007–2008) ===
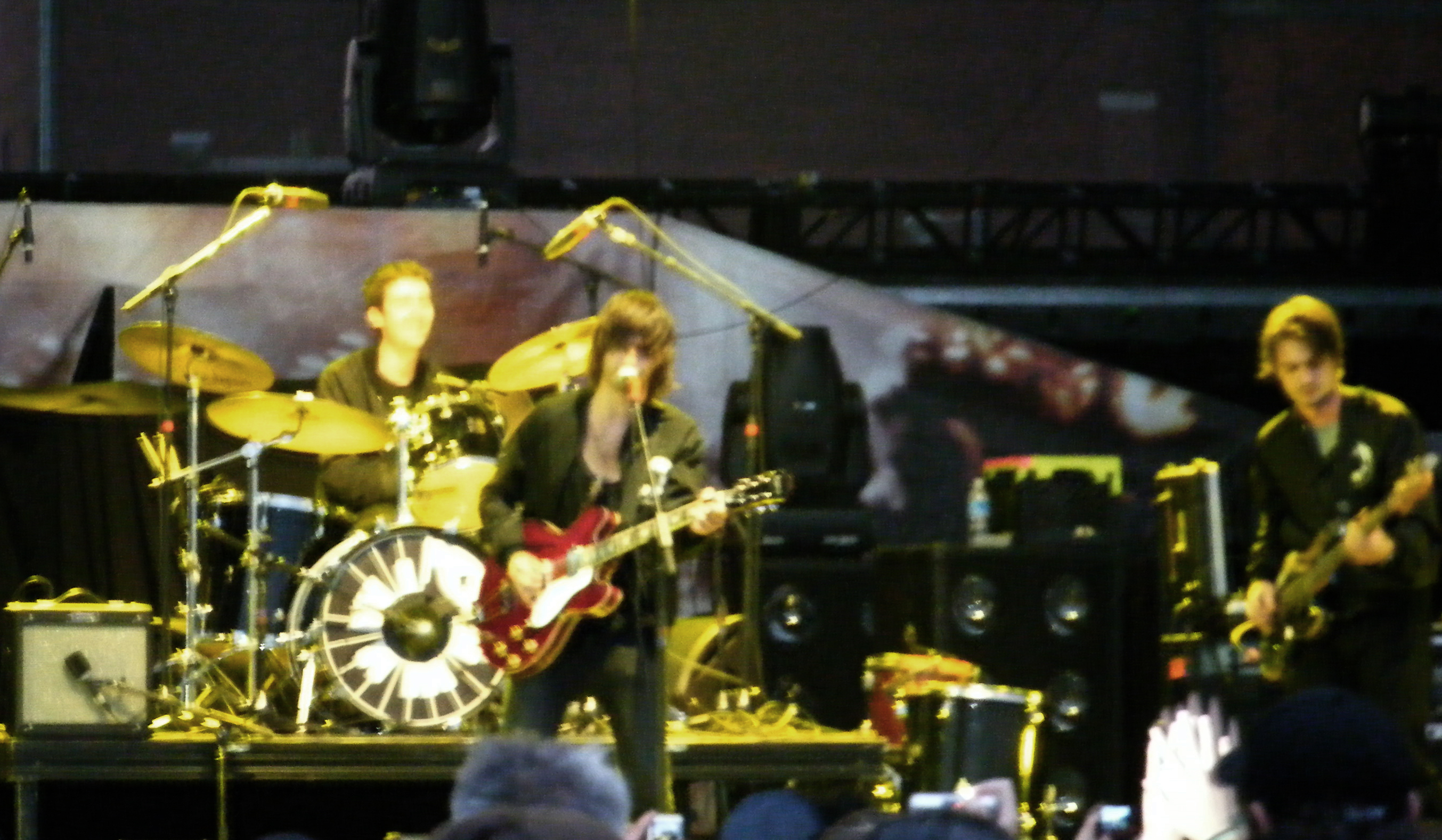
Phantom Planet performing in August 2008

Early on in the recording process of their fourth studio album, Phantom Planet's contract with Epic Records expired and they signed to Fueled by Ramen. Raise the Dead was released on April 15, 2008. When describing the new record, Greenwald described it as "a concept record. If The Beatles had Sgt. Pepper's and The Rolling Stones had Their Satanic Majesties Request, we have our 'Leader.' We're concocting it, but at the same time we're following it." The first single from the album was "Do the Panic".

On November 25, 2008, Phantom Planet announced in a blog entry on their website that they would be going on hiatus and playing their last show December 12, 2008 at The Troubadour in Los Angeles.

=== First reunion (2011–2013) ===
On December 20, 2011, Phantom Planet posted a video of them rehearsing the song "Knowitall". Along with this upload, they announced that they would reunite for a few shows, and possibly even record an EP. In late January 2012, the band announced their first reunion show, June 13, at The Troubadour in Los Angeles. On January 31, they announced the addition of a second Troubadour show to be played June 14, 2012. Former member of the band, Jacques Brautbar, joined them for songs at the June 13 show.

In August 2013, the band, under Alex Greenwald & Phriends, performed a new song titled "Balisong", which ended up being on Greenwald's solo album and later released in 2019 as a single by the full band. This performance did not have bassist Sam Farrar because he was touring with Maroon 5. He was replaced by former Jamiroquai bassist Stuart Zender.

=== Second reunion, Devastator, and Jeff Conrad's departure (2019–2023) ===
A Phantom Planet Instagram account was created on January 19, 2019, indicating that the band could be reforming. Additionally, band members posted the logo on their personal social media accounts. It was confirmed that the band played a small secret private show January 19, 2019, at No Name on Fairfax in Los Angeles.

On March 18, 2019, the band officially announced "Hiatus. Over." They announced their first "public" show in over seven years at Hanson's "Hop Jam" Music and Beer Festival in Tulsa, Oklahoma on May 19, 2019. Before that event, they scheduled three shows across Southern California.

On May 7, the band officially released their first song in 11 years, "Balisong". The song was a reworked version of a track previously released on Greenwald's solo album. In March 2020, Phantom Planet announced the release of their fifth album Devastator on May 8, 2020, and their first album in 12 years since Raise the Dead (2008). However, the album was delayed to June 19, due to the then-COVID-19 pandemic. It was later pushed again one day earlier June 18, as a way of showing respect and support to the Black Lives Matter movement. Sometime after 2024, longtime drummer Jeff Conrad quietly left the band and was replaced by Andrew Parker, having been a member of Robinson's side project Fist Fright and an occasional touring drummer with the band since 2022. Since 2022, Chris Lorentz has filled in for Farrar on bass on select tour dates when he is performing with Maroon 5.

=== Continued activity and upcoming sixth studio album (2023–present) ===
In May 2023, the band released a re-recording of "California" as a non-album single and in November released their first new material since 2020, a Christmas single titled "Maybe You Still Call it Christmas". This was soon followed by a series of other singles including "Drive On" in April 2024 and "Riding the Wave" in September (featuring the former and a sped-up version as a B-side). In November 2024, the band released a remix of "Maybe You Still Call it Christmas" featuring Canadian singer Sarah McLachlan, followed by a Christmas EP also titled Maybe You Still Call it Christmas, featuring the title track alongside a cover of Mariah Carey's "All I Want for Christmas Is You" and the remix featuring McLachlan, among others. In May 2025, the band made a guest appearance on a new version of the 2005 hit "Catch My Disease" titled "Catch My Disease 2025" by Australian actor and singer Ben Lee (who appears on the original artwork for The Guest), followed by the single "Friction" in October 2025, as well as "Yesterday's Dead" and "Never Apart" in 2026. As of 2026, the band is working on their sixth studio album.

== Side projects and related work ==
Original drummer, Jason Schwartzman, a member of the Coppola family and now primarily working as an actor, began his acting career while still a member of the band, making his film debut in the 1998 Wes Anderson film Rushmore. Schwartzman left the band in 2003 to focus on his acting career but has made occasional musical contributions, including forming the project Coconut Records in 2007, which released two albums in 2007 and 2009 respectively. Schwartzman's cousin, filmmaker Roman Coppola also directed two music videos for the band during their The Guest era, "California" and "Lonely Day", the latter of which was the band's last single and video with Schwartzman.

From 2004 to 2008, Greenwald, under the moniker Clark Schädelkopf, had a side project named Blackblack consisting of him and his then-girlfriend Diva Dompe and her sister Lola, both of whom are the daughters of former Bauhaus drummer Kevin Haskins.

In September 2009, Greenwald officially announced the tracks for his solo record. He posted the track listing and a CD mockup to his Twitter account. The debut solo studio album by Greenwald, Yo, was released on May 5, 2014.

Greenwald has co-produced and appeared on ex–Panic! at the Disco members, Ryan Ross and Jon Walker's post-Panic band, The Young Veins lone album, Take a Vacation!. He has also produced a few tracks on the band The Like's second album. More recently, Greenwald recorded with Mark Ronson & the Business Intl, playing guitar, keyboards, and singing on the album.

Greenwald was a member of the indie pop supergroup Phases. He is also helping fellow band member Darren Robinson in his side project Twin Terrors.

Farrar joined a band called Operation Aloha with members of Gomez and Maroon 5. Operation Aloha's self-titled, lone album was released on May 12, 2009. It was recorded over a period of 30 days in Maui, Hawaii.

In 2011, Farrar formed the project Bubble and Strife with fellow musician and his wife Stephanie Eitel, formerly of Agent Sparks.

Since 2012, Farrar is touring with Maroon 5 (of whom he was prior a frequent collaborator with) – as an additional band member – on guitars, occasionally on the bass guitar, percussion, backing vocals, turntables and providing samples and other special effects (using the MPC). He co-wrote and co-produced a few of the band's songs on almost all of their studio albums and also remixed one of their songs, which is called "Woman", on Call and Response: The Remix Album, released in 2008. On August 31, 2012 – during a show in Argentina on the Overexposed World Tour – Farrar filled-in for Mickey Madden on the bass guitar for the very first time. He subsequently filled-in for Madden on the next few shows of the tour. In 2016, he has become an official member.

Robinson went on tour with the band Miniature Tigers in early 2009. He also toured as member of singer/songwriter John Graney's Southern California surf band The Californian, in the summer of 2009. The band then included John Graney (vocals), himself (guitar and vocals), Jonathan Price (guitar, keys, and vocals), Wendy Wang (bass and vocals), Mike Hopkins (drums).

Robinson has three projects, Twin Terrors, Dead Honcho, which has songs uploaded to SoundCloud, and Fist Fright with Andrew Parker, which currently has three songs posted on Bandcamp.

Former drummer Jeff Conrad has a project called Vibe Mountain.

== In popular culture ==
The band has opened for many well-known artists, including Guns N' Roses, Sting, Elvis Costello, Incubus, Guided by Voices, Blink-182, The Zombies, The Hives, Sloan, American Hi-Fi, Maroon 5, Ludacris, Panic! at the Disco, The Rocket Summer, Hanson and Paramore.

Phantom Planet has appeared on Sabrina the Teenage Witch, performing "So I Fall Again". They have also appeared on American Dreams, playing British rock band The Zombies and performing "Tell Her No" in the episode "A Clear and Present Danger". The song "Lonely Day" appeared in the television series Smallville. They have appeared in the 2005 film Bad News Bears, playing as a fictional "skate" band called The Bloodfarts. In 2005, they covered the CSNY track "Our House" for the movie The Chumscrubber. Phantom Planet also performed a cover of Jackson Browne's "Somebody's Baby" for Not Another Teen Movie. "Big Brat" was also introduced in the soundtrack to the video game Driver 3 and featured in an episode from the first season of One Tree Hill, as well as used in the film The Amazing Spider-Man. Greenwald and Farrar appeared on a Funk/R&B cover of Radiohead's "Just" by British musician, DJ and producer Mark Ronson for the 2006 Radiohead tribute album Exit Music: Songs with Radio Heads, where it was released as the album's sole single, although Greenwald (a frequent collaborator of Ronson's) is solely credited as the featured performer in this release, and performed moderately well in the UK Charts. Ronson's cover of "Just" featuring Greenwald and Farrar was re-issued in February 2008, now crediting the whole band as the featured performers, as the fourth and final single from Ronson's 2007 studio album of cover versions, Version, and performed slightly better in the UK Charts than its initial release. Farrar also contributed to the Hanson album Underneath, on the song "Lost Without Each Other". In 2008, "Raise the Dead" was featured in an episode from the second season of Gossip Girl and "Do the Panic" was featured on the Gossip Girl soundtrack, OMFGG – Original Music Featured on Gossip Girl. Their music has been heard frequently on television, most notably "California", as the theme song for the popular TV show The O.C., and the songs "Do the Panic" and "Dropped" in various commercials.

== Band members ==
Current

- Alex Greenwald – lead vocals, rhythm guitar, keyboards, occasional bass (1994–2008, 2011–2013, 2019–present)
- Sam Farrar – bass, backing vocals, occasional guitar and keyboards (1994–2008, 2011–2012, 2019–present), drums (2003–2004)
- Darren Robinson – lead guitar, backing vocals (1994–2008, 2011–2013, 2019–present)
- Andrew Parker – drums (2024–present; touring 2022–2024)

Touring

- Stuart Zender – bass (2013)
- Chris Lorentz – bass (2022–present; fills in when Farrar is performing with Maroon 5)

Former

- Jason Schwartzman – drums, percussion (1994–2003)
- Jacques Brautbar – rhythm and lead guitar, keyboards, backing vocals, occasional bass (1994–2004, 2012)
- Jeff Conrad – drums, percussion (2004–2008, 2011–2013, 2019–2024)

== Discography ==
- Phantom Planet Is Missing (1998)
- The Guest (2002)
- Phantom Planet (2004)
- Raise the Dead (2008)
- Devastator (2020)

== Filmography ==
Phantom Planet filmography
Year	Title	Role	Notes
1998	Sabrina the Teenage Witch	Themselves	Episode: "And the Sabrina Goes to..."
2004	American Dreams	The Zombies	Episode: "A Clear and Present Danger"
2005	Bad News Bears	The Bloodfarts	
