= List of track-for-track cover albums =

Type of cover album

A track-for-track cover album (also called a track-by-track tribute, song-for-song remake, and full-album cover) is an album that covers most or all songs on one album, usually in the same order as the original. This is distinct from a new or live version performed by the original artist, which is usually called a remake, re-recording, self-cover, or an album in full performance. This is also different from cover albums and anthologies, where songs from multiple artists and albums are included together.

== Notable examples ==
Two of the earliest "track-for-track" cover records are both versions of Abbey Road by the Beatles. The first is George Benson's The Other Side of Abbey Road, a jazz reimagining of songs from the album, recorded just 26 days after Abbey Road's release. The album features Herbie Hancock, Freddie Hubbard, Ron Carter, and Idris Muhammad. The second is Booker T. & the M.G.'s McLemore Avenue, a mostly instrumental cover album. The cover art for McLemore Avenue shows Booker T. and three band members crossing McLemore Avenue, in an homage to the original cover art. Neither album exactly duplicates the order of the original tracks, though both albums only feature tracks from Abbey Road. McLemore Avenue was released in April 1970, coinciding with the official breakup of the Beatles.

Camper Van Beethoven released a track-for-track cover of Fleetwood Mac's Tusk in 2003.

The Vitamin String Quartet has released many cover versions of rock and pop artists, including a track-for-track cover of Radiohead's OK Computer.

Beck Hansen's project, Beck's Record Club, has featured multiple track-for-track covers of albums by artists like the Velvet Underground and INXS. These albums are single-session covers, i.e. all recorded on the same day by artists gathered together in the same place.

== Major track-for-track cover albums ==
| Year | Cover artist | Cover album | Original album | Label | Notes |
|---|---|---|---|---|---|
| 1970 | George Benson | The Other Side of Abbey Road | The Beatles – Abbey Road (1969) | A&M | Recorded just 26 days after Abbey Road's release with Herbie Hancock, Freddie Hubbard, Ron Carter and Idris Muhammad under Creed Taylor's production; Benson sings as well as plays guitar, condensing the 17 tracks into 10 cuts that mostly follow the original sequence as a string of mini-medleys. |
| 1970 | Booker T. & the M.G.'s | McLemore Avenue | The Beatles – Abbey Road (1969) | Stax | Instrumental Memphis-soul homage covering 14 of 17 tracks, arranged into three medleys plus a standalone "Something." Tracks are re-sequenced rather than presented in original order. Steve Cropper overdubbed his parts without ever having heard the source LP. |
| 1988 | Laibach | Let It Be | The Beatles – Let It Be (1970) | Mute | Slovenian industrial-collective rendering in militaristic-choir style; omits the title track and replaces "Maggie Mae" with a German folk medley. "Across the Universe" features Anja Rupel of Videosex. |
| 1992 | Big Daddy | Sgt. Pepper's | The Beatles – Sgt. Pepper's Lonely Hearts Club Band (1967) | Rhino | Released for the 25th anniversary; all 13 tracks rendered in original order in the styles of late-1950s/early-1960s pop performers (Coasters, Johnny Mathis, Jerry Lee Lewis, Dion, Paul Anka, Elvis Presley) and a Buddy Holly-style closing "A Day in the Life". |
| 1993-2000 | Various artists | Ramones covers series | 8 Ramones studio albums (1976-1984) | Selfless Records | Limited edition track-for-track remakes of Ramones albums by various punk acts on Selfless Records. Covering bands included Screeching Weasel, The Mr. T Experience, and The Queers |
| 2001 | Luther Wright and the Wrongs | Rebuild the Wall | Pink Floyd – The Wall (1979) | Back Porch / Wolfe Island | Canadian band recasts all 26 tracks of the Floyd double LP as a bluegrass song cycle in full original sequence, with banjo, fiddle, pedal steel and farmyard effects; Sarah Harmer guests on "Mother". Roger Waters reportedly gave enthusiastic approval. |
| 2003 | Camper Van Beethoven | Tusk | Fleetwood Mac – Tusk (1979) | Pitch-A-Tent / Cooking Vinyl | Song-for-song double-LP remake in original order, recorded in 2001 as the band's reunion test-run and released with a false back-story claiming a 1987 origin. Lindsey Buckingham praised the record; the title track is stretched to triple length with sitar and marching band. |
| 2003 | Easy Star All-Stars | Dub Side of the Moon | Pink Floyd – The Dark Side of the Moon (1973) | Easy Star | Track-for-track dub-reggae version preserving the original's continuous segues and the unofficial Wizard of Oz synchronicity. Guests include Frankie Paul, Gary "Nesta" Pine, Corey Harris and Dr. Israel. Charted on Billboard's Reggae chart for over seven years. |
| 2005 | Petra Haden | Petra Haden Sings: The Who Sell Out | The Who – The Who Sell Out (1967) | Bar/None | Entirely a cappella reinterpretation of all 14 tracks in original order, including instrumental parts and the mock-radio jingles, built on a TASCAM 488 8-track Portastudio given to Haden by Mike Watt. Pete Townshend publicly praised it as "a gift." |
| 2006 | Easy Star All-Stars | Radiodread | Radiohead – OK Computer (1997) | Easy Star | Track-for-track reggae/ska/dub reading in original sequence, with vocal turns from Toots and the Maytals, Horace Andy, Citizen Cope, Israel Vibration, Sugar Minott and Morgan Heritage. Thom Yorke praised it from the stage; Jonny Greenwood called it "truly astounding." |
| 2007 | Dirty Projectors | Rise Above | Black Flag – Damaged (1981) | Dead Oceans | David Longstreth's from-memory reconstruction of every song in original sequence, having not heard Damaged in 15 years. |
| 2007 | Rufus Wainwright | Rufus Does Judy at Carnegie Hall | Judy Garland – Judy at Carnegie Hall (1961) | Geffen | Live cover of songs from Garland's signature comeback performance |
| 2009 | Easy Star All-Stars | Easy Star's Lonely Hearts Dub Band | The Beatles – Sgt. Pepper's Lonely Hearts Club Band (1967) | Easy Star | Complete reggae/dub reading of Sgt. Pepper's in original order with guests including Steel Pulse, Sugar Minott, Bunny Rugs (Third World), Matisyahu, U-Roy, The Black Seeds and Michael Rose. |
| 2009 | Various Artists | The Velvet Underground & Nico | The Velvet Underground – The Velvet Underground & Nico (1967) | Self-released | Various artists from Argentina collaborated to produce a cover of the record. Some songs are in English, others have been translated to Spanish. These bands played a number of concerts in Buenos Aires to celebrate the release of the album, which was made available online for free. |
| 2009 | Beck's Record Club | Beck's Record Club: The Velvet Underground & Nico | The Velvet Underground – The Velvet Underground & Nico (1967) | Self-released (beck.com) | The inaugural session was recorded in a single day in June 2009 with Beck joined by Nigel Godrich, Joey Waronker, Brian LeBarton, Bram Inscore, Giovanni Ribisi, Chris Holmes and Icelandic singer Þórunn Antonía Magnúsdóttir; all eleven tracks were covered in their original album sequence and trickled out as weekly videos on beck.com. |
| 2009 | Beck's Record Club | Beck's Record Club: Songs of Leonard Cohen | Leonard Cohen – Songs of Leonard Cohen (1967) | Self-released (beck.com) | The second installment was tracked in a single day with Devendra Banhart, MGMT's Ben Goldwasser, Andrew VanWyngarden, and Will Berman, Wolfmother's Andrew Stockdale, Little Joy's Binki Shapiro, plus returning regulars Brian LeBarton and Bram Inscore; the ten tracks were posted in original album order one per week starting in November 2009. |
| 2009/2010 | The Flaming Lips, Stardeath and White Dwarfs, Henry Rollins and Peaches | The Dark Side of the Moon | Pink Floyd – The Dark Side of the Moon (1973) | iTunes (digital) / Warner Bros. (CD/vinyl) | Track-for-track cover in original sequence, released digitally on 22 December 2009 and as a physical edition on Record Store Day 2010. Rollins recites the spoken-word interludes; Peaches handles "The Great Gig in the Sky." |
| 2010 | Beck's Record Club | Beck's Record Club: Oar | Skip Spence – Oar (1969) | Self-released (beck.com) | Recorded in a single day in June 2009 at Sunset Sound Studios with Wilco (including Jeff Tweedy, Nels Cline and Tweedy's son Spencer Tweedy), Feist, Jamie Lidell, session drummer James Gadson and Brian LeBarton, with weekly videos rolled out on beck.com from late 2009 through 2010 in the original album order. |
| 2010 | Beck's Record Club | Beck's Record Club: Yanni Live at the Acropolis | Yanni – Yanni Live at the Acropolis (1994) | Self-released (beck.com) | The fifth and final Record Club was recorded in a single session at Sunset Sound Studios on June 13, 2010, with Beck, Sonic Youth's Thurston Moore (who improvised lyrics over the originally instrumental "Santorini") and members of Tortoise performing a doctored, complete cover of Yanni's 1994 PBS concert album, with the tracks released in original order, one per week on beck.com. |
| 2010 | Various Artists | Let it Be Revisited | The Beatles – Let it Be (1970) | Mojo | A CD containing interpretations of the songs by Beth Orton, Phosphorescent, Judy Collins, Wilko Johnson, the Besnard Lakes, John Grant and the Jim Jones Revue, among others. |
| 2012 | Castle Face & Friends (Various Artists) | The Velvet Underground & Nico | The Velvet Underground — The Velvet Underground & Nico (1967) | Castle Face Records, Universal | Features covers from Thee Oh Sees, Ty Segall, Kelley Stoltz, Warm Soda, and other artists affiliated with Castle Face Records. |
| 2012 | Easy Star All-Stars | Easy Star's Thrillah | Michael Jackson – Thriller (1982) | Easy Star | Track-for-track reggae reimagining of Thriller in original order, with guests including Steel Pulse, Mojo Morgan (Morgan Heritage), Cas Haley, Michael Rose and Luciano. |
| 2012 | Jasper Patrick Leach | White Light/White Heat | The Velvet Underground – White Light/White Heat (1968) | Self-released (Bandcamp) | Lo-fi DIY cover of all six tracks in original order, recorded July-November 2012 in Berkeley, California "on various broken equipment" by multi-instrumentalist Jasper Leach. |
| 2014 | The Flaming Lips & Fwends | With a Little Help from My Fwends | The Beatles – Sgt. Pepper's Lonely Hearts Club Band (1967) | Warner Bros. | Track-by-track cover in original order featuring Miley Cyrus, Moby, My Morning Jacket, J Mascis, Tegan and Sara, Maynard James Keenan, MGMT's Ben Goldwasser, Foxygen, and Phantogram, among others; proceeds donated to the Bella Foundation. |
| 2015 | Ryan Adams | 1989 | Taylor Swift – 1989 (2014) | PAX-AM / Blue Note | Track-by-track cover in original sequence, recast in alt-country and Smiths-inflected rock arrangements; positive reviews in Rolling Stone and Pitchfork and an endorsement from Swift herself. |
| 2016 | Train | Train Does Led Zeppelin II | Led Zeppelin — Led Zeppelin II (1969) | Atlantic | Full-album live cover of the album, proceeds went to San Francisco charity Family House |
| 2018 | Angélique Kidjo | Remain in Light | Talking Heads - Remain in Light (1980) | Kravenworks | Track-for-track reimagining of Talking Heads album, produced by Jeff Bhasker |
| 2021 | Various artists | I'll Be Your Mirror: A Tribute to The Velvet Underground & Nico | The Velvet Underground & Nico – The Velvet Underground & Nico (1967) | Verve | Track-for-track tribute in original order curated for the album's reissue and the Todd Haynes documentary. Participants include Michael Stipe, St. Vincent, Thomas Bartlett, Sharon Van Etten and Angel Olsen, Iggy Pop and Matt Sweeney, Bobby Gillespie, Kurt Vile, Thurston Moore, Courtney Barnett and Fontaines D.C. |
| 2023 | Easy Star All-Stars | Ziggy Stardub | David Bowie – The Rise and Fall of Ziggy Stardust and the Spiders from Mars (1972) | Easy Star | Track-for-track reggae reimagining in original order, plus a bonus "All the Young Dudes" closer. Guests include Macy Gray, Steel Pulse, Maxi Priest, Fishbone, The Skints and instrumental contributions from Alex Lifeson and Vernon Reid. Released 21 April 2023. |
