= Ticklah vs. Axelrod =

Album by Victor Axelrod

Studio album by Ticklah
- Released: September 18, 2007
- Genre: Reggae, Dub
- Label: Easy Star Records
- Producer: Victor Axelrod a.k.a. Ticklah, Michael Goldwasser

Ticklah chronology
Polydemic (1998)	Ticklah vs. Axelrod (2007)	Hi-Fidelity Dub Sessions: Roots Combination (2001)

Ticklah vs. Axelrod is the third full-length solo album released September 2007 on Easy Star Records by musician, producer, engineer and DJ, Victor Axelrod a.k.a. Ticklah of New York City. The album features guest vocals by reggae stars Mickey General and Rob Symeonn, Tamar-kali (of the documentary film Afro-Punk), Mayra Vega (vocalist on Antibalas' "Che Che Colé") and Vinia Mojica (best known for her work with De La Soul and A Tribe Called Quest). This album features instrumental contributions from members of Antibalas, Easy Star All-Stars and Dub Is A Weapon as well as fellow New York dub musician/producer Victor Rice. Ticklah vs. Axelrod was recorded and engineered at Don't Trip Studios in Brooklyn, New York. The final track "Nine Years" was featured in an episode of Breaking Bad.

== Song composition ==
Ticklah has created his own kind of dub record with Ticklah vs. Axelrod. The dub production is obvious in its heavy use of dub effects and experimentation employing heavy reverb, delay and effects (especially on the instrumentals "Two Face" and "Descent") however, Ticklah also approaches each song composition, paying close attention to each individual component of reggae music to craft each song: rhythm, melody, harmonies, arrangement and sound. There are also unique dub twists found within the album; The melody on “Answer Me” was inspired by a simple piano piece by the innovative 20th-century Russian composer Vladimir Rebikov. A ska twist can be heard in the Latin track, "Mi Sonsito," as well as a reggae interpretation of another Eddie Palmieri Latin classic "Si Hecho Palante."

Professional ratings
Review scores
Source	Rating
Allmusic	4/5 stars

== Track listing ==
1. Two Face
2. Want Not (featuring Tamar-Kali)
3. Scratch To Win
4. Mi Sonsito (featuring Mayra Vega)
5. Rescue Me (featuring Mikey General)
6. Pork Eater (featuring Rob Symeonn)
7. Nature Loving Dub
8. Descent
9. Si Hecho Palante (featuring Mayra Vega)
10. Answer Me
11. Queen Dub (featuring Rob Symeonn)
12. Deception (featuring Vinia Mojica)
13. Nine Years

== Vinyl releases ==
There have been two 7" single vinyl releases from this album. The first single released in 2008 of “Rescue Me” (featuring the vocals of Mikey General) has an unreleased, non-album dub version of the song on the B-side, called “Rockers Salvation.” The second single released in 2009 is a limited edition pressing of "Pork Eater" (featuring Easy Star vocalist Rob Symeonn) with an instrumental version on the B-side.
