= Dubber Side of the Moon =

Studio album by Easy Star All-Stars
- Released: October 26, 2010
- Genre: Dub, Dubstep, Ambient dub
- Label: Easy Star Records
- Producer: Original Tracks by Michael G and Ticklah. Remixes by Dubmatix, 10 Ft. Ganga Plant, Groove Corporation, Dubphonic, The Alchemist, Dreadzone, Kalbata, Adrian Sherwood & Jazzwad, Victor Rice, Border Crossing, Mad Professor, Michael G, J.Viewz

Easy Star All-Stars chronology
Easy Star's Lonely Hearts Dub Band (2009)	Dubber Side of the Moon (2010)	First Light (2011)

Dubber Side of the Moon is the second dub reggae tribute to the Pink Floyd album, The Dark Side of the Moon by New York–based band Easy Star All-Stars. The album features bass-heavy dub remixes by prominent dub producers of its predecessor, Easy Star Records' 2003 release Dub Side of the Moon. Dubber Side of the Moon debuted at #2 on the Billboard Reggae charts.

== Reviews ==
Professional ratings
Review scores
Source	Rating
Allmusic	link
The Independent	link
Music News	link
Glide Magazine	link
contactmusic.com	link

"Great effort. Great remixes. Great album." – Music News

"This second re-imagining rightly uses its predecessor as a launch pad while keeping the Floyd's uniquely ambivalent overall mood, but allows the re-mixers ideas to take flight." – Angus Taylor, BBC Music

"A highly desirable set of beatmakers and dub masters are handling the remixes here..." – David Jeffries, All Music

== Track listing ==
1. "Speak to Me/Breathe (In The Air)" (Dubmatix Remix)
2. "On the Run" (10 Ft. Ganja Plant Remix)
3. "Time" (Groove Corporation Remix)
4. "The Great Gig in the Sky" (Dubphonic Remix)
5. "Money" (The Alchemist Remix)
6. "Us and Them" (Dreadzone Remix)
7. "Any Colour You Like" (Kalbata Remix)
8. "Brain Damage" (Adrian Sherwood & Jazzwad Remix)
9. "Eclipse" (Victor Rice Remix)

Bonus tracks

10. "Step It Pon The Rastaman Scene" (Border Crossing Remix)
11. "Money" (Mad Professor Remix)
12. "Time Version" (Michael G Easy Star All-Stars Remix)
13. "On The Run" (J.Viewz Remix)
