= Dub Side of the Moon =

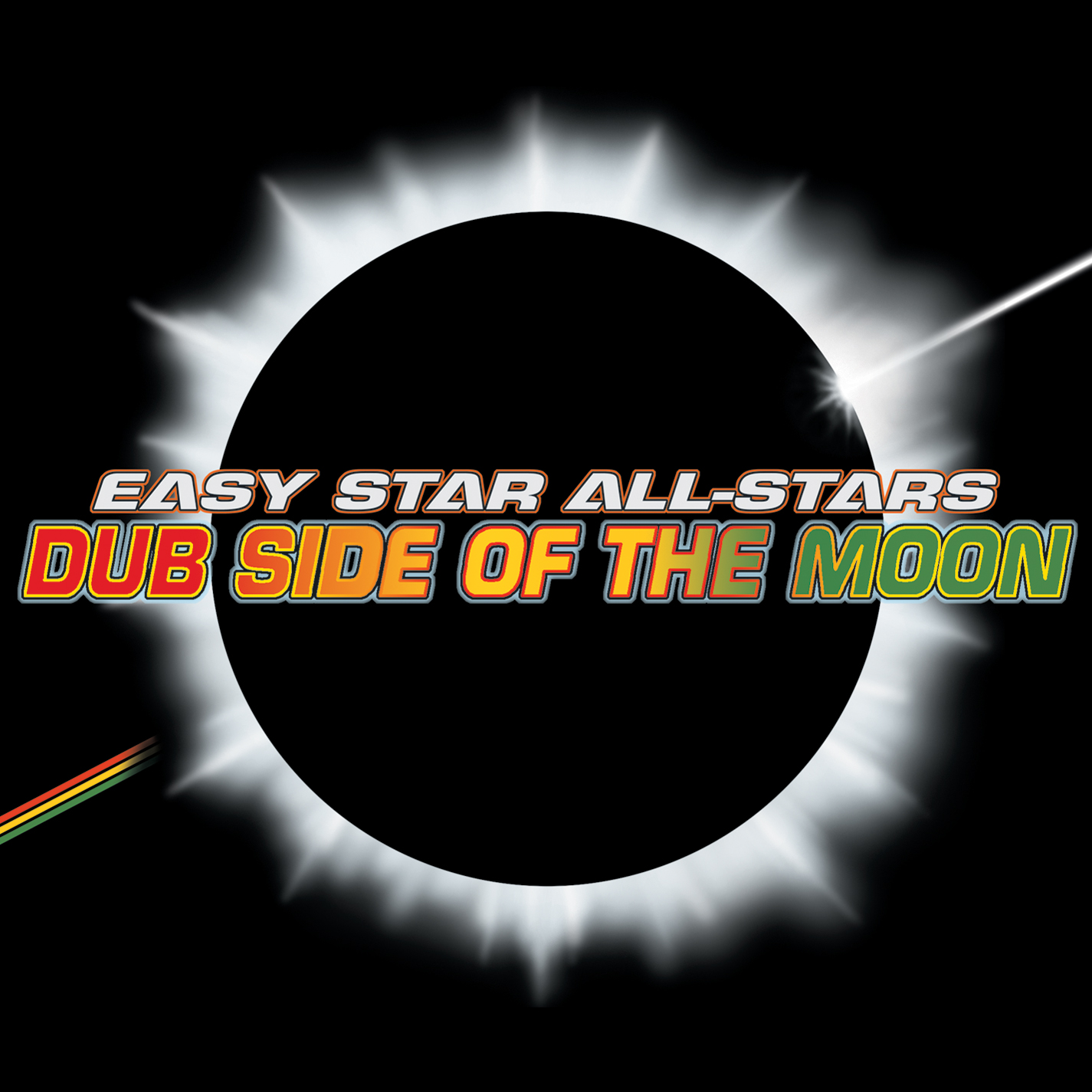

Studio album by Easy Star All-Stars
- Released: 18 February 2003
- Genre: Reggae, dub
- Length: 58:04
- Label: Easy Star Records
- Producer: Michael G and Ticklah

Easy Star All-Stars chronology
| Dub Side of the Moon (2003) | Radiodread (2006) |

"Money"
Money audio sample

Dub Side of the Moon is a dub reggae track-for-track tribute to the 1973 Pink Floyd album The Dark Side of the Moon by the American reggae band Easy Star All-Stars. Easy Star All Stars released Dub Side of the Moon: Special Anniversary Edition, on CD and vinyl, on September 16, 2014.

== Release details ==
Included with the liner notes are instructions on how to synchronize the album with the 1939 film The Wizard of Oz and produce a variation of the perceived "Dark Side of the Rainbow" effect. The album has sold over 85,000 copies thus far and Easy Star All-Stars have been regularly touring in support of the album. Artist and Drummer Patrick Dougher performed on the recording but did not tour with the band.

A DVD of a live performance of Dub Side of the Moon was released by the Easy Star label in July 2006.

In 2010 the album was remixed in a bass-heavy dub style and reissued as Dubber Side of the Moon Easy Star All Stars released Dub Side of the Moon: Special Anniversary Edition on September 16, 2014.

== Track listing ==
| No. | Title | Performer | Length |
|---|---|---|---|
| 1. | "Speak to Me" / "Breathe (In the Air)" | Sluggy Ranks | 3:52 |
| 2. | "On the Run" | | 3:23 |
| 3. | "Time" | Corey Harris and Ranking Joe | 6:58 |
| 4. | "The Great Gig in the Sky" | Kirsty Rock | 4:25 |
| 5. | "Money" | Gary "Nesta" Pine and Dollarman | 6:26 |
| 6. | "Us and Them" | Frankie Paul | 7:55 |
| 7. | "Any Colour You Like" | | 3:38 |
| 8. | "Brain Damage" | Dr. Israel | 4:07 |
| 9. | "Eclipse" | The Meditations | 1:52 |
| 10. | "Time (Alternative Version)" (bonus track) | | 3:38 |
| 11. | "Great Dub in the Sky" (bonus track) | | 4:21 |
| 12. | "Step It Pon the Rastaman Scene" (bonus track) | Ranking Joe | 4:02 |
| 13. | "Any Dub You Like" (bonus track) | | 3:22 |
