= Full-album performance =

Concert type

A full-album performance (also called an album-in-full or complete album concert) is a concert that features a recording artist performing one of their own albums in its entirety, usually in the original track order. Such concerts are commonly staged to mark an album's anniversary or to present an artistically significant work as a continuous whole.

The format was popularized in the mid-2000s by the British concert series Don't Look Back, organized by the promoters of the All Tomorrow's Parties festival, and by the end of the decade had become a recognized trend in live music.

Commentators generally trace the practice to the touring performances of the Beach Boys' album Pet Sounds given by Brian Wilson from 2000 onward, which the critic Dorian Lynskey credited with "helping establish the practice, now ubiquitous, of playing classic albums in full." The trend has also drawn criticism from some musicians, who have variously characterized it as nostalgic, complacent, or artistically regressive.

== Origins and popularisation ==
=== Brian Wilson and Pet Sounds ===
Brian Wilson began performing the Beach Boys's 1966 album Pet Sounds from beginning to end around 2000. Lynskey dated the start of these performances to 2001. A 2002 performance at London's Royal Festival Hall was issued on the live album Brian Wilson Presents Pet Sounds Live. Wilson revived the format for a 50th-anniversary world tour in 2016, again performing the record in sequence. Lynskey wrote that Wilson's Pet Sounds concerts helped establish a now-common concert practice.

=== Don't Look Back ===
The Don't Look Back series, curated by the promoters of All Tomorrow's Parties, invited established acts to recreate a single celebrated album in full. An Associated Press feature in 2008 identified the series as "the trendsetter in getting bands to play their classic albums" and quoted the promoter Barry Hogan, who framed the concept as a celebration of the album rather than a marketing device. NME later wrote that the series had "popularized" the format, asking acts such as Sonic Youth, Dinosaur Jr., The Lemonheads and Belle and Sebastian to perform seminal albums in full, after which "the complete album gig" became, in the magazine's description, a hallmark of cult bands with long-term followings.

Albums performed in full during the series and its associated festivals included The Stooges' Fun House, Gang of Four's Entertainment!, and Belle and Sebastian's If You're Feeling Sinister, alongside sets by Cat Power and Dinosaur Jr. At an All Tomorrow's Parties event in 2010, performers played complete albums including Iggy and the Stooges' Raw Power (1973), Sleep's Holy Mountain, Mudhoney's Superfuzz Bigmuff (1990), and the Sunn O))) and Boris collaboration Altar.

== Characteristics and motivations ==
Full-album performances are frequently timed to coincide with the anniversary of an album's original release. The Associated Press described the format as "part marketing gimmick, part an act of nostalgia," and as a means of staging "communal celebrations of the album as an art form." Because the format requires an artist to perform an entire record–including songs rarely played live–reviewers have treated the ability to sustain a complete album, or several in succession, as a demanding undertaking. A 2023 Variety review noted that recreating "two, three or even four classic albums in their entirety for a run of back-to-back concerts" had once been regarded as a "Herculean feat."

Some performances expand the recorded material with additional staging or musicians. Lou Reed performed his 1973 album Berlin in full in 2006 with a roughly 35-piece ensemble and stage design by the artist and filmmaker Julian Schnabel; the production was explicitly associated with the Don't Look Back model of presenting a celebrated album in its entirety.

== Critical reception ==
The trend has been the subject of debate among musicians and critics. NME canvassed several artists who objected to the format: Dave Grohl called it "presumptuous" and "lazy," Bloc Party's Kele Okereke described it as "cynical" and "cringey," and Billy Corgan of The Smashing Pumpkins called it "regressive." Defenders have framed the practice as a celebration of the album as a complete work rather than as commercial nostalgia, a view expressed by promoter Barry Hogan in connection with the Don't Look Back series.

== See also ==
- Concept album
- Concert residency
- Don't Look Back (concert series)
- Re-recording (music)
- Track-for-track cover album
