= Beck's Record Club =

American cover album project

Record Club was a musical project initiated by Beck in June 2009.

The purpose of the project was to cover an entire album by another artist in one day, using an informal and fluid collective of musicians. Albums covered were The Velvet Underground's The Velvet Underground & Nico, Leonard Cohen's Songs of Leonard Cohen, Skip Spence's Oar, INXS's Kick, and Yanni's Yanni Live at the Acropolis. Video footage of every performance has been made available on Beck's website.

== Albums covered ==
1. The Velvet Underground & Nico – The Velvet Underground (1967)
2. Songs of Leonard Cohen – Leonard Cohen (1967)
3. Oar – Skip Spence (1969)
4. Kick – INXS (1987)
5. Yanni Live at the Acropolis – Yanni (1994)

== Musicians ==
=== The Velvet Underground and Nico ===
- Nigel Godrich
- Beck Hansen
- Chris Holmes (Yum-Yum, Ashtar Command)
- Bram Inscore
- Brian LeBarton
- Thorunn Antonia Magnusdottir (Fields)
- Giovanni Ribisi
- Joey Waronker
- Yo

=== Songs of Leonard Cohen ===
- Devendra Banhart
- Will Berman (MGMT)
- Ben Goldwasser (MGMT)
- Beck Hansen
- Bram Inscore
- Brian LeBarton
- Binki Shapiro (Little Joy)
- Andrew Stockdale (Wolfmother)
- Andrew VanWyngarden (MGMT)

=== Oar ===
- Leslie Feist
- James Gadson
- Beck Hansen
- Brian LeBarton
- Jamie Lidell
- Wilco (as well as Jeff Tweedy's son Spencer on additional drums)

=== Kick ===
- St. Vincent
- Daniel Hart (longtime St. Vincent collaborator)
- Sergio Dias (of Os Mutantes)
- Angus Andrew (of Liars)
- Aaron Hamphill (of Liars)
- Julian Gross (of Liars)
- Beck Hansen
- Brian LeBarton

=== Yanni Live at the Acropolis ===
- Thurston Moore of Sonic Youth
- Tortoise
- Beck Hansen
- Various session musicians
