= First Light (Easy Star All-Stars album) =

Studio album by Easy Star All-Stars

Studio album by Easy Star All-Stars
- Released: April 5, 2011
- Genre: Reggae, dub
- Label: Easy Star Records

Easy Star All-Stars chronology
| Dubber Side of the Moon (2010) | First Light (2011) | Easy Star's Thrillah (2012) |

First Light is the fourth studio album (fifth overall) by Jamaican-American collective Easy Star All-Stars. Unlike their other albums, this is the first album that features original songs by the band.

Professional ratings
Review scores
| Source | Rating |
|---|---|
| thepier.org | Album Review on thepier.org |

== Track listing ==
1. Don’t Stop The Music
2. Break Of Dawn
3. First Light (Ramblin’ Fever)
4. One Likkle Draw (Feat. Junior Jazz and Daddy Lion Chandell) (Daddy Lion Chandell from Subatomic Sound System)
5. Something Went Wrong
6. Easy Now Star (Feat. The Meditations, Tony Tuff, and Lady Ann)
7. Universal Law
8. Paid My Dues
9. Reggae Pension
10. In The Light
11. Unbelievable (Feat. Cas Haley)
12. All The Way
13. I Won’t Stop
14. Don’t Stop Dub Music

[Bonus Tracks]

- 15. First Light (Dubmatix Remix)
- 16. Demons
