= Sgt. Pepper's (Big Daddy album) =

Studio album by Big Daddy
- Released: February 4, 1992
- Genre: Rock 'n' roll
- Length: 34:14
- Label: Rhino
- Producer: Big Daddy

Big Daddy chronology
Cutting Their Own Groove (1991)	Sgt. Pepper's (1992)	Smashing Songs of Stage and Screen (2013)

Sgt. Pepper's is a tribute album consisting of covers of the entirety of Sgt. Pepper's Lonely Hearts Club Band by The Beatles. The album was recorded by Big Daddy in 1992 and features covers which combine the lyrics and some musical elements from the original Beatles versions with stylistic elements of certain genres and musicians, mostly ones popularized in the 1950s. The album's release coincided with the 25th anniversary of the original Beatles album. It was the band's last album until 2013's Smashing Songs of Stage and Screen.

== Artwork ==
The album's cover art was directly inspired by that of Sgt. Pepper's Lonely Hearts Club Band. It was designed by Michael Bryan with direction from Geoff Gans. It prominently features an acoustic bass and the background is filled with iconic figures, mostly comedic.

== Reception ==
Sgt. Pepper's received moderately positive reception. People magazine called the album "a hoot" and said even "when the novelty fades, the tunes stand on their own blue suede shoes as music to boogie to, even when you’re 64."

== Track listing ==
All tracks are written by Lennon–McCartney except "Within You Without You", by George Harrison.

No.	Title	in the style of	Length
1.	"Sgt. Pepper's Lonely Hearts Club Band"	The Coasters	2:21
2.	"With a Little Help from My Friends"	Johnny Mathis	2:50
3.	"Lucy in the Sky with Diamonds"	Jerry Lee Lewis	2:21
4.	"Getting Better"	Skip and Flip	3:47
5.	"Fixing a Hole"	Dion DiMucci	3:04
6.	"She's Leaving Home"	Paul Anka	3:32
7.	"Being for the Benefit of Mr. Kite!"	Freddy Cannon	2:29
8.	"Within You Without You"	Ken Nordine	1:55
9.	"When I'm Sixty-Four"	Billy Ward and his Dominoes	3:20
10.	"Lovely Rita"	Elvis Presley	1:54
11.	"Good Morning Good Morning"		2:46
12.	"Sgt. Pepper's Lonely Hearts Club Band (Reprise)"	The Coasters	1:04
13.	"A Day in the Life"	Buddy Holly	5:00

== Personnel ==
According to Discogs:

Big Daddy

- Bob Wayne – lead and harmony vocals, engineering
- Marty Kaniger – lead and harmony vocals, acoustic guitar, autoharp
- Tom Lee – lead vocals, backing bass vocals, electric guitar
- Don Raymond – lead and harmony vocals
- John Hatton – lead vocals on "Being for the Benefit of Mr. Kite", backing vocals, electric bass, acoustic bass, orchestration on "With A Little Help from my Friends"
- Bob Sandman – tenor and baritone saxophone, flute
- Damon DeGrignon – drums and percussion, engineering

Additional musicians and production

- Tim Bonhomme – celesta, piano, Hammond organ and calliope
- Ed Willett – cello
- Nancy Weckwerth – French horn
- Roberta Wall – backing vocals
- Joanne Kurman-Montana – backing vocals
- Kim Wilkins – viola
- Calabria McChesney – violin
- Bette Byers – violin

== See also ==
- With a Little Help from My Fwends
- Easy Star's Lonely Hearts Dub Band
