= Radiodread =

Studio album by Easy Star All-Stars
- Released: 22 August 2006
- Genres: Reggae, ska, dub
- Length: 65:22
- Label: Easy Star
- Producer: Michael Goldwasser

Easy Star All-Stars chronology
Dub Side of the Moon (2003)	Radiodread (2006)	Until that Day (2008)

Professional ratings
Review scores
Source	Rating
Allmusic	4/5 stars
Being There	3.5/5 stars
The Independent	2/5 stars
The Observer	3/5 stars
Pitchfork Media	(7.0/10)
Rolling Stone	3/5 stars

"Karma Police"
Karma Police audio sample

Radiodread is a track-for-track cover album by the Jamaican-American reggae collective the Easy Star All-Stars that covers the English rock band Radiohead's 1997 album OK Computer in reggae, ska and dub styles. It was released on 22 August 2006 in the United States and on 28 August in the UK.

== History ==
The Radiodread producer and arranger, Michael Goldwasser, said OK Computer had elements that were well suited to reggae, such as "strong melodies, intense dynamics and trippy soundscapes", but also uncommon elements such as complex time signatures and lots of chord changes. He said, "The more we looked at it, the more we realized that this was an album we had to do." The Radiohead singer, Thom Yorke, praised it, and the lead guitarist, Jonny Greenwood, described it as "truly astounding".

The album features musicians including Toots and the Maytals, Horace Andy, Israel Vibration, Sugar Minott and Frankie Paul. The track listing is identical to OK Computer and no songs were changed, except for "Fitter Happier" (which has slightly altered lyrics to fit the style, with permission from Radiohead), and "Paranoid Android". The new lyrics are essentially the same, but phrased differently, including some Jamaican patois. For example, "God loves his children" becomes "Jah loves his children".

== Track listing ==
1. "Airbag" (featuring Horace Andy) – 5:00
2. "Paranoid Android" (featuring Kirsty Rock) – 6:27
3. "Subterranean Homesick Alien" (featuring Junior Jazz) – 4:41
4. "Exit Music (For a Film)" (featuring Sugar Minott) – 4:23
5. "Let Down" (featuring Toots & the Maytals) – 4:44
6. "Karma Police" (featuring Citizen Cope) – 4:48
7. "Fitter Happier" (featuring Menny More) – 2:20
8. "Electioneering" (featuring Morgan Heritage) – 4:34
9. "Climbing Up the Walls" (featuring Tamar-kali) – 4:56
10. "No Surprises" (featuring The Meditations) – 4:02
11. "Lucky" (featuring Frankie Paul) – 5:45
12. "The Tourist" (featuring Israel Vibration) – 4:07
13. "Exit Music (For a Dub)" – 4:39
14. "An Airbag Saved My Dub" – 4:50
15. "Dub Is What You Get" (Mad Professor/Joe Ariwa Mix) (Vinyl Only) – 4:38
16. "Lucky Dub A" (Mad Professor/Joe Ariwa Mix) (Vinyl Only) – 4:53
17. "High and Dry" (featuring Morgan Heritage) (track #15 on the Special Edition release) – 5:10

== See also ==
- Exit Music: Songs with Radio Heads
