= Easy Star's Lonely Hearts Dub Band =

Studio album by Easy Star All-Stars
- Released: April 14, 2009
- Genre: Reggae, dub
- Label: Easy Star Records

Easy Star All-Stars chronology
Until that Day (2008)	Easy Star's Lonely Hearts Dub Band (2009)	Dubber Side of the Moon (2010)

Professional ratings
Review scores
Source	Rating
AllMusic	3.5/5 stars
The Independent	4/5 stars
Rhapsody	Favorable
PopMatters	5/10

Easy Star's Lonely Hearts Dub Band is a dub reggae track-for-track tribute to the Beatles' album Sgt. Pepper's Lonely Hearts Club Band, by the Easy Star All-Stars. It was released on April 14, 2009.

== Track listing ==
1. "Sgt. Pepper's Lonely Hearts Club Band" ft. Junior Jazz
2. "With a Little Help from My Friends" ft. Luciano
3. "Lucy in the Sky with Diamonds" ft. Frankie Paul
4. "Getting Better" ft. The Mighty Diamonds
5. "Fixing a Hole (Extended Dub Mix)" ft. Max Romeo
6. "She's Leaving Home" ft. Kirsty Rock
7. "Being for the Benefit of Mr. Kite!" ft. Ranking Roger
8. "Within You Without You" ft. Matisyahu
9. "When I'm Sixty-Four (Extended Dub Mix)" ft. Sugar Minott
10. "Lovely Rita" ft. Bunny Rugs & U-Roy
11. "Good Morning Good Morning" ft. Steel Pulse
12. "Sgt. Pepper's Lonely Hearts Club Band (Reprise)" ft. Junior Jazz
13. "A Day in the Life" ft. Michael Rose and Menny More

Bonus tracks

14. "With a Little Dub from My Friends" ft. Luciano and U Roy
15. "Kaleidoscope Dub"

== See also ==
- Sgt. Pepper's (Big Daddy album)
- With a Little Help from My Fwends
