= Until That Day =

EP by Easy Star All-Stars
- Released: March 2008
- Genre: Reggae
- Length: 25:07
- Label: Easy Star Records
- Producer: Michael Goldwasser

Easy Star All-Stars chronology
Radiodread (2006)	Until That Day (2008)	Easy Star's Lonely Hearts Dub Band (2009)

Until that Day is an EP by the Easy Star All-Stars. Every track is original except for the final track, which is a dub version of their own version of Radiohead's "Climbing Up the Walls" that was featured on their last cover album Radiodread. The EP is available to download from the Easy Star records website in MP3 and in FLAC formats.

== Track listing ==
1. Got to Get Away (4:30)
2. Bed of Rose (4:02)
3. Like the Stars (4:24)
4. Until That Day (4:33)
5. The Finest (3:32)
6. Dubbing Up the Walls (4:11)
