= Skavoovie and the Epitones =

Ska band

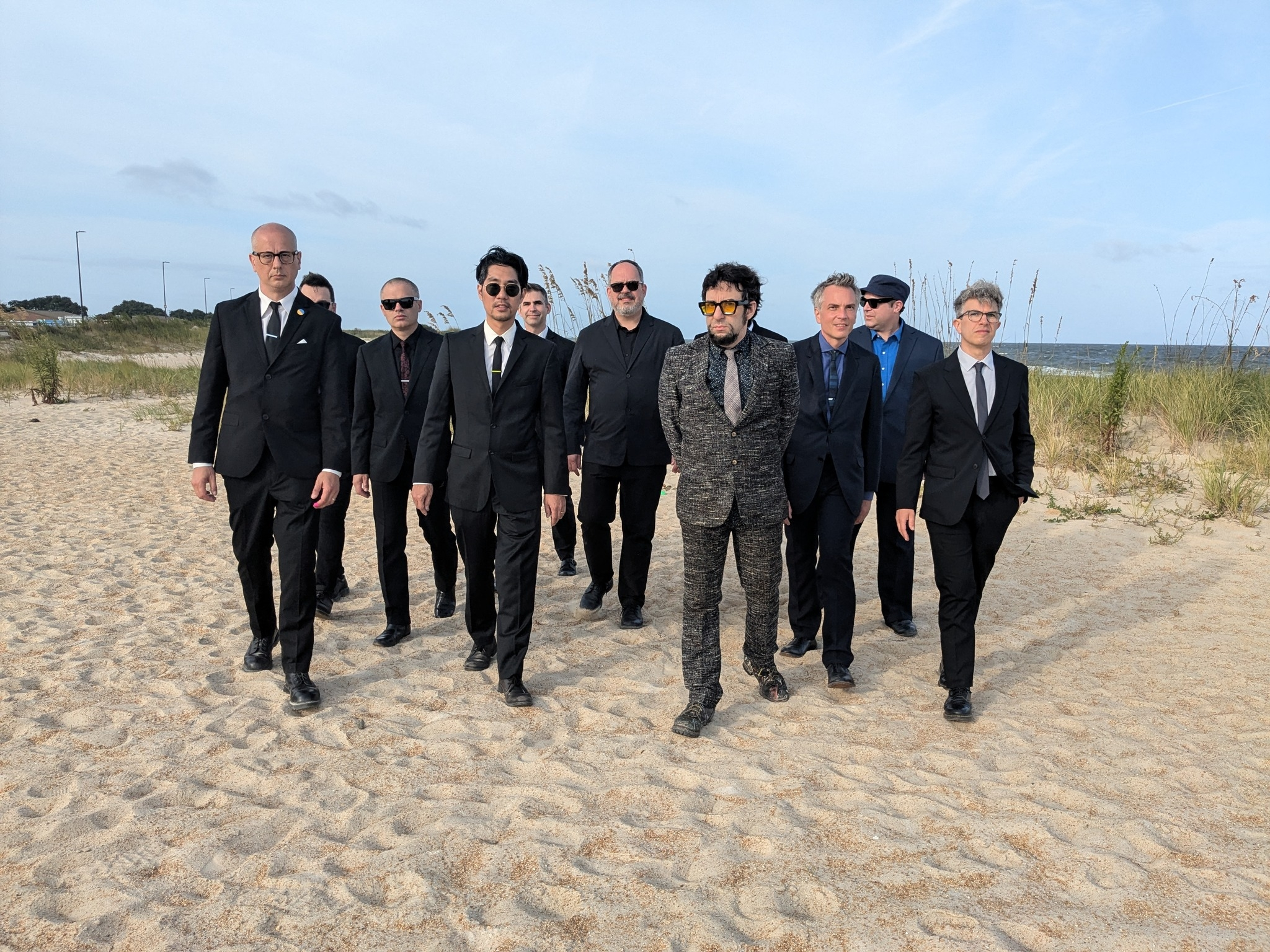

Background information
- Origin: Newton, Massachusetts
- Genres: ska
- Years active: 1994–1999, 2024
- Labels: Moon Ska Records; Shanachie Records; Ska Punk International Records
- Past members: Kevin Micka; Ansis Purins; Ethan D'Ercole; Ben Jaffe; Eric Jalbert; Eugene Cho; Ben Herson; Daniel Neely; Jon Natchez; Ben Lewis; Joe Wensink; Jesse Farber; Rob Jost

Skavoovie and the Epitones Skavoovie & The Epitones is an American ska band formed in Newton, Massachusetts, in 1992. The band is recognized for integrating traditional Jamaican ska with jazz, big band, and other musical styles. From 1992 to 1999, the band released three studio albums and appeared on multiple compilations. They played a significant role in the third-wave ska movement of the 1990s. In 2024, they reunited for a performance at the Supernova International Ska Festival, marking their first live appearance in over two decades.

== Early Years and Formation (1992–1995) ==
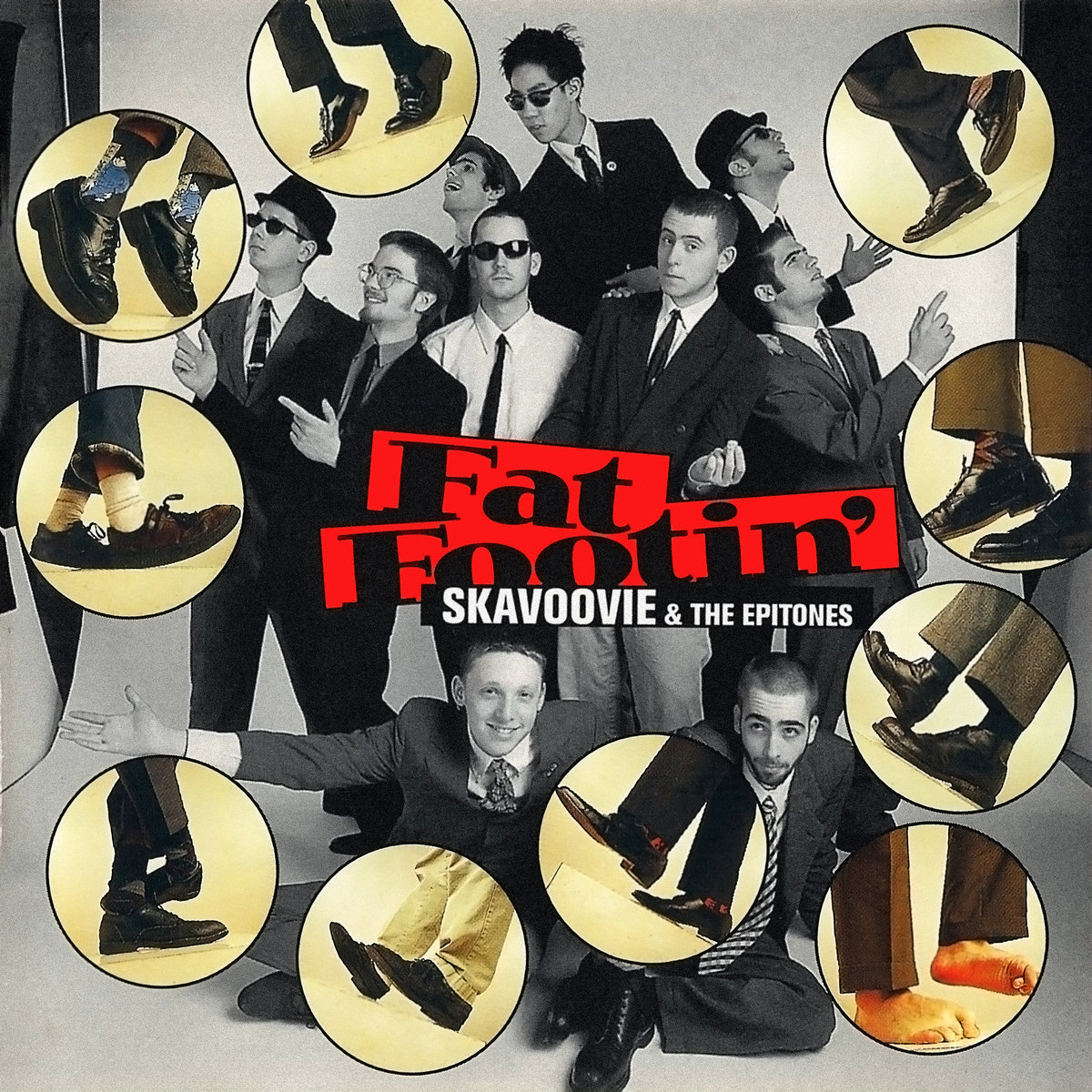

The original members of Skavoovie and the Epitones included Ansis Purins (vocals), Ben Jaffe (tenor saxophone), Eugene Cho (keyboards), Jesse Farber (trumpet), Ben Herson (drums), Rob Jost (bass), Kevin Micka (guitar), Eric Jalbert (trumpet), Joe Wensink (euphonium), and Jon Natchez (baritone saxophone). The band later expanded to include Daniel Neely (guitar), Ben Lewis (trumpet), and Ethan D'Ercole (guitar.)

== Demo Tape and Compilation Contributions (1994) ==
In 1994, the band self-released a demo tape titled An Evening with Skavoovie…. Their track "Nut Monkey" was included in the Skarmageddon compilation released by Moon Ska Records the same year. This exposure helped the band secure a recording contract with Moon Ska Records.

== Debut Album: Fat Footin' (1995) ==
The band’s debut album, Fat Footin', was released in 1995 through Moon Ska Records. It became one of the fastest-selling debuts on the label. The album combined instrumental and vocal tracks, featuring a blend of ska, jazz, and big band influences. Following the album's release, the band embarked on extensive U.S. tours.

== Second Album: Ripe (1997) ==
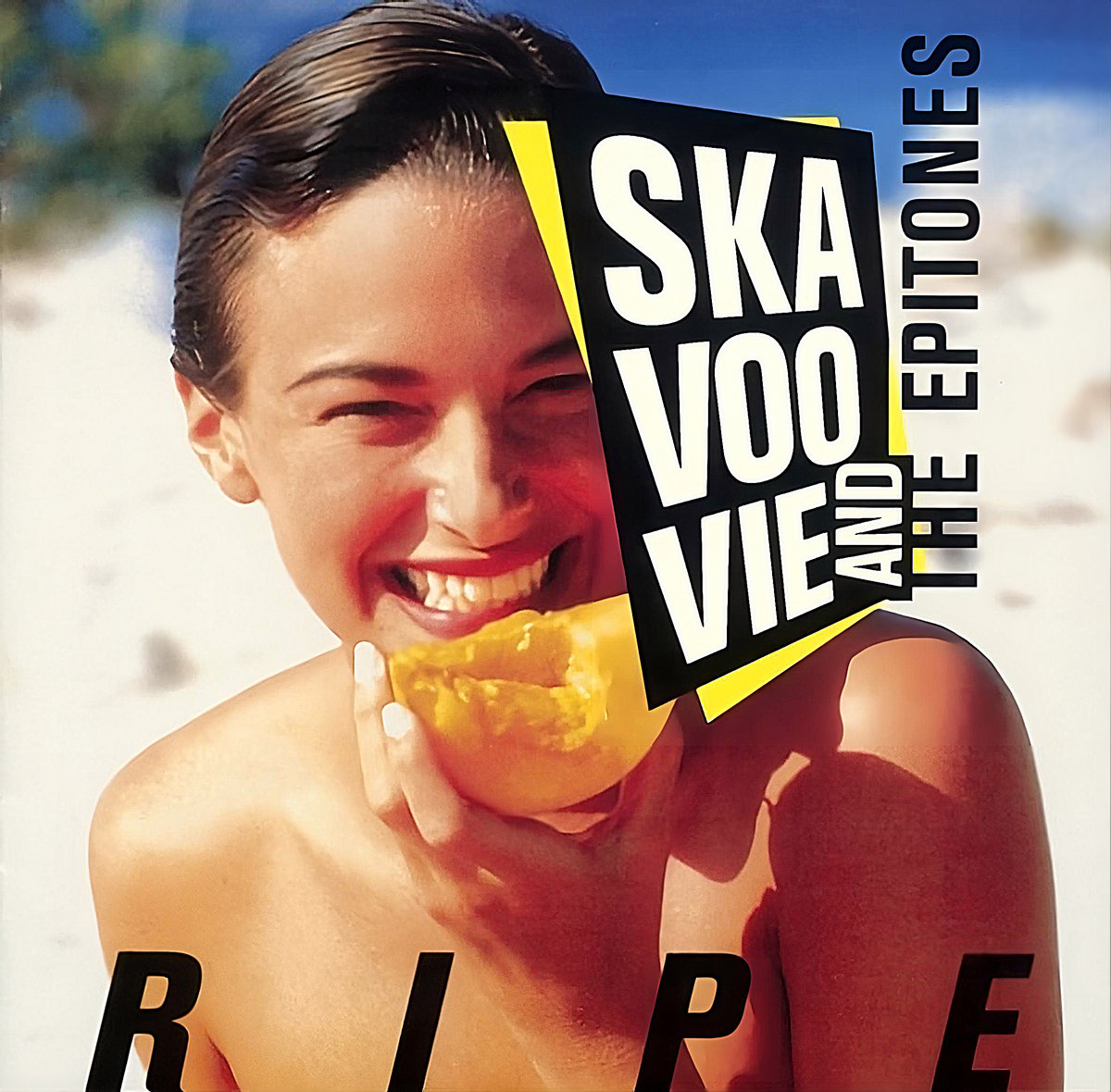

In 1997, Skavoovie & The Epitones released their second studio album, Ripe, produced by Victor Rice and engineered by Matt Ellard. This album marked a shift in the band's musical direction, incorporating elements of jazz, sci-fi themes, and unconventional song structures. The release of Ripe was supported by more national touring and the band’s first European tour.

== Final Album: The Growler (1999) and Disbandment ==
The band's third and final studio album, The Growler, was released in 1999 through Shanachie Records. The album continued the band's exploration of jazz fusion and experimental composition, further moving away from traditional ska. After their final performance in 2000, Skavoovie & The Epitones disbanded.

== Reunion at Supernova Ska Festival (2024) ==
In 2024, Skavoovie & The Epitones reunited for their first live performance in 24 years at the Supernova International Ska Festival. To coincide with the reunion, the band re-released their second album, Ripe, on digital platforms and with a double vinyl release and have plans to release live material in the future.

== Lineup ==
- Ansis Purins (Vocals)
- Ben Herson (Drums)
- Ben Jaffe (Tenor sax)
- Eugene Cho (Keyboards)
- Jesse Farber (Trumpet)
- Eric Jalbert (Trumpet)
- Joe Wensink (Euphonium)
- Ethan D'Ercole (Guitar)
- Kevin Micka (Guitar)
- Daniel Neely (Guitar)
- Ben Lewis (Trumpet)
- Jon Natchez (Flute, Alto & Baritone sax)
- Rob Jost (Bass)

== Discography ==
=== Studio albums ===
- An Evening With Skavoovie... (1994, Self-released, Cassette)
- Fat Footin' (1995, Moon Ska Records)
- Ripe (1997, Moon Ska Records; 2024, Ska Punk International)
- The Growler (1999, Shanachie Records)

=== Singles & EPs ===
- Beardman Ska (1996, Moon Ska Records, 7" Single)

=== Compilations Appearances ===
- Mash It Up Volume 3 (1994, DVS Media) – "One Mint Julep"
- Skarmageddon (1994, Moon Ska Records) – "Nut Monkey"
- Oi! / Skampilation Vol. #1 (1995, Radical Records) – "One Mint Julep"
- Ska The Third Wave (1995, Continuum Records) – "One Mint Julep"
- Skanarchy Volume 2 (1995, Elevator Music) – "She Sure Can Cook"
- Skanking Around The Internet Volume 1 (1995, Not On Label) – "One Eyed Giant"
- The Blackpool's Skampilation Volume 3 (1995, Steady Beat Recordings) – "She Sure Can Cook"
- This Are Moon Ska (1996, Moon Ska Records) – "Japanese Robot"
- Roots, Branch And Stem: Living Tradition In SKA! (1996, Stubborn Records) – "Blood Red Sky"
- Keep The Pressure On (1996, Kingpin Records) – "Hob-Nobbin'"
- SKAndalous: I've Gotcha Covered (1996, Shanachie) – "Batman Theme"
- Ska-Ville USA Volume 6 (1996, Skank Records) – "One Mint Julep"
- Ska: The Instrumentals (1997, Beloved Recordings) – "Cat Juice"
- Mash It Up Volume 4 (1997, DVS Media) – "Riverboat"
- Skankaholics Unanimous (1997, Moon Ska Records) – "Cat Juice"
- Bang - Original Movie Soundtrack (1997, Moon Ska Records) – "Riversion"
- Midnight Radio Vol. 1 (1997, Jump Start Records) – "Phobus"
- This Are Moon Ska! 2 (1997, Moon Ska Records) – "Japanese Robot"
- This Are Moon Ska (1997, Tachyon International) – "Japanese Robot"
- Up Your Ears! Volume 2 (1998, Grover Records) – "She Sure Can Cook"
- SKA The Third Wave Vol. 5 - Swing It! (1998, Beloved Recordings) – "She Sure Can Cook"
- Moon Ska, New York, U.S.A. (1998, Moon Ska Europe) – "Blood Red Sky"
- Mestres Do Ska (1998, Moon Ska Brasil) – "Blood Red Sky"
- This Are Moon Ska 3 (1998, Moon Ska Records) – "Blood Red Sky"
- Super Ripe (1998, Moon Ska Japan/Tachyon International) – Selection of tracks from first and second albums
- Roots, Branch And Stem Volume 2: Ska's Not Dead (1999, Stubborn Records) – "9 Dragons"
- Swing It! (1999, Beloved Recordings) – "She Sure Can Cook"
- Mash It Up 2000 (2000, DVS Media) – "Boyo (Live)"
- SKA...Doesn't It All Sound The Same? (2000, Moon Ska Europe) – "Fat Soul"
