= Lovely Rita =

- Cover of the Northern Songs sheet music

Song by the Beatles

from the album Sgt. Pepper's Lonely Hearts Club Band
- Released: 26 May 1967
- Recorded: 23–24 February, 7 and 21 March 1967
- Studio: EMI, London
- Genre: Psychedelia; music hall
- Length: 2:42
- Label: Parlophone
- Songwriter: Lennon–McCartney
- Producer: George Martin

"Lovely Rita" is a song by the English rock band the Beatles from their 1967 album Sgt. Pepper's Lonely Hearts Club Band. It was written mainly by Paul McCartney and credited to Lennon–McCartney. It is about a meter maid and the narrator's affection for her.

== Inspiration ==
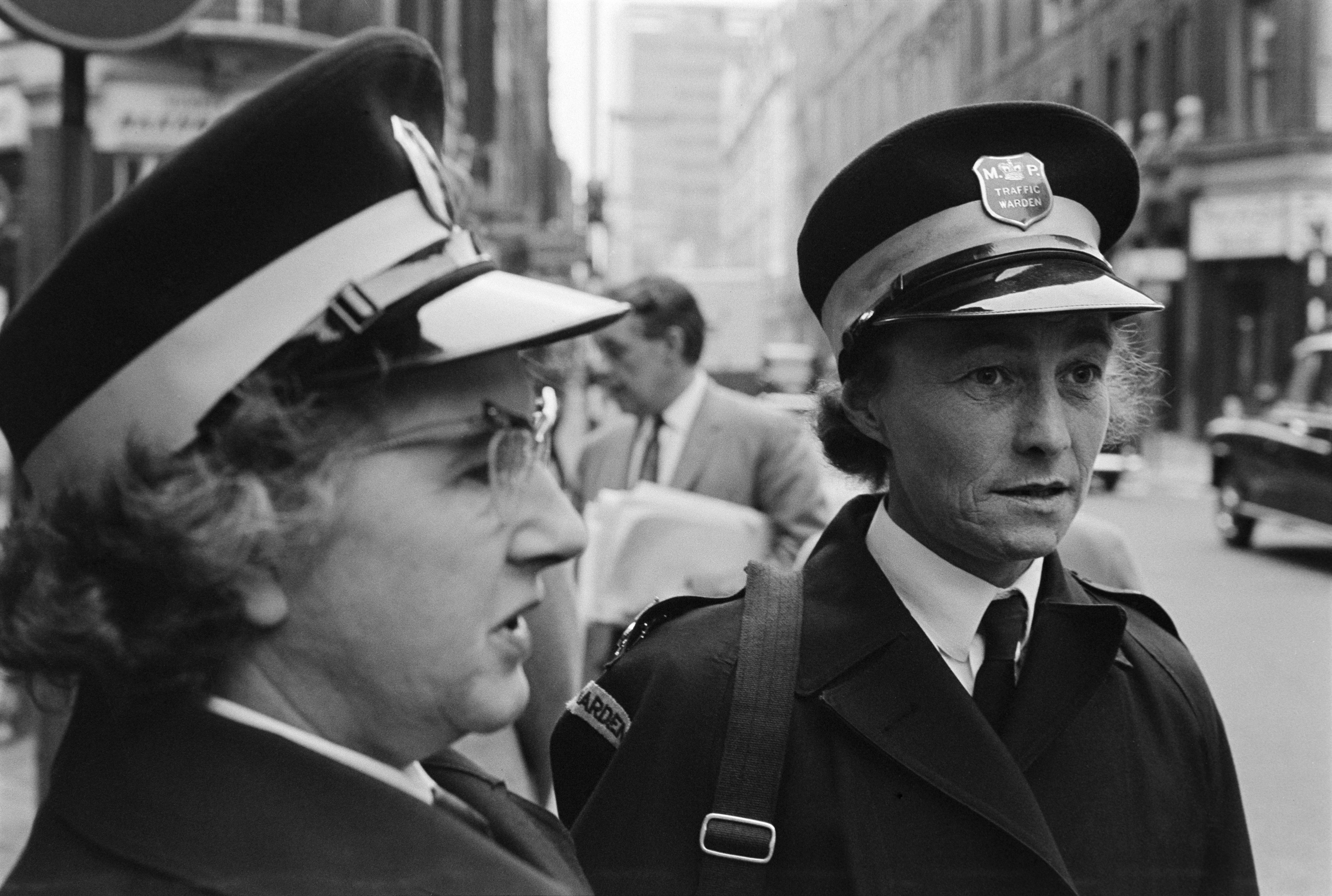
Two female traffic wardens in London, 1969

The term "meter-maid", largely unknown in the UK before the song's release, is American slang for a female traffic warden. "Lovely Rita" originates from when a female traffic warden named Meta Davies issued a parking ticket to McCartney outside Abbey Road Studios. Instead of becoming angry, he accepted it with good grace and expressed his feelings in song. When asked why he had called her "Rita", McCartney replied, "Well, she looked like a Rita to me".

In his comments to biographer Barry Miles, however, McCartney rebutted the idea that this episode inspired the song: "It wasn't based on a real person. I think it was more a question of coincidence … I didn't think, 'Wow, that woman gave me a ticket, I'll write a song about her.' Never happened like that." Author John Winn writes that McCartney's inspiration came from hearing the term "meter maid", after which he began writing the song when visiting his brother Michael in Liverpool.

According to a contemporary report on the recording of "Lovely Rita", in Beat Instrumental magazine, the lyrics were completed by McCartney and John Lennon during the session. A reproduction of the manuscript shows only the opening chorus and verse in McCartney's handwriting; the remaining lyrics appear in Beatles assistant Mal Evans' handwriting, after he and Neil Aspinall joined the two songwriters in a corner of the studio.

== Recording ==
Recording began on 23 February 1967 with eight takes required to achieve a satisfactory basic track. Using a four-track recorder, this first performance featured George Harrison's guitar on track 1, Lennon's guitar on track 2, Ringo Starr's drums on track 3, and McCartney's piano set on track 4. After those individual tracks had been combined in a reduction mix, McCartney overdubbed a bass guitar part.

The 24 February session was devoted to adding vocals. According to engineer Geoff Emerick, McCartney had told George Martin, the band's producer, that he wanted the backing vocals to replicate how the Beach Boys "might approach the song". The Beatles were visited in the studio that evening by Tony Hicks of the Hollies, American musicians David Crosby and Shawn Phillips, and the brother of Ravi Shankar, Harrison's sitar teacher. Also present was Leslie Bryce, a photographer from Beatles Monthly. McCartney recorded his lead vocal with the tape speed reduced, so that his voice sounded at a higher pitch when the speed was corrected. Bryce took photos of Lennon, McCartney, Harrison and Crosby grouped around a microphone, and the Beat Instrumental report stated that the backing vocals were recorded that night with Crosby's participation. Phillips later supported this and said that he too sang backing vocals with the three Beatles. However, Phillips' recollection is not supported by others, who say the group vocals were instead overdubbed on 7 March.

The session was led by Lennon and recorded with heavy tape echo. Enjoying the lighthearted session, the Beatles also added percussive effects played on comb and paper, serving as handmade kazoos, and vocalised sounds such as moans, sighs and screams. The latter sounds appear over the song's extended coda. Martin later described the session as "anarchy", given how little was achieved over the seven hours, and cited it as a precedent for the group's "undisciplined, sometimes self-indulgent" method of working on Magical Mystery Tour later in 1967.

A second piano, played by Martin was added for the solo on 21 March. This session was again filled with visitors. Among these were the band Pink Floyd, who were recording in a neighbouring studio and gained entry to the session through their producer, Norman Smith, formerly the Beatles' recording engineer. Although Pink Floyd were established as one of the leading bands in the London underground scene, they were intimidated to be in the Beatles' presence. Drummer Nick Mason recalled that they watched the band mixing "Lovely Rita" but they were "God-like figures to us" and any interaction between the two groups was minimal.

The final mono mix was completed that night, and a month later, the stereo mix was done. During mixdown the tape machine ran at 48.75 Hz instead of the standard 50 Hz, affecting the pitch on the released track. With vari-speed having been applied throughout the recording process, the song's key is around E flat major. According to Martin, "Lovely Rita" and "When I'm Sixty Four" were the songs that would have been cut from Sgt. Pepper had the Beatles not been pressured into issuing "Strawberry Fields Forever" and "Penny Lane" as a non-album single in advance of the album's release. In the opinion of music critic Richie Unterberger, "Lovely Rita" is "one of the more lighthearted songs on Sgt. Pepper's Lonely Hearts Club Band, and consequently one of the more critically overlooked".

== McCartney live performances and cover versions ==
McCartney first performed "Lovely Rita" in concert on 4 May 2013, when he opened his Out There! world tour at the Estádio Mineirão in Belo Horizonte, Brazil.

Fats Domino included the song on his 1968 album Fats Is Back. Richie Unterberger dismisses Domino's version as a "none-too-thrilling soul cover". In 1976, Roy Wood of ELO and Wizzard recorded the song for All This and World War II, a film that set new recordings of 30 Lennon–McCartney compositions to newsreel footage from World War II.

Joan Osborne sings the song on the 2009 Cheap Trick release Sgt. Pepper Live. The Easy Star All-Stars recorded a version with guest vocalists Bunny Rugs and U-Roy for their 2009 Sgt. Pepper tribute album Easy Star's Lonely Hearts Dub Band.

== Personnel ==
According to Ian MacDonald, the line-up on the Beatles' recording was as follows:

The Beatles

- Paul McCartney – lead and backing vocal, piano, bass guitar, comb and tissue paper
- John Lennon – backing vocal, vocal percussion, acoustic rhythm guitar, comb and tissue paper
- George Harrison – backing vocal, acoustic rhythm guitar, comb and tissue paper
- Ringo Starr – drums, comb and tissue paper

Additional musician

- George Martin – piano (solo)

== Sources ==
- Clayson, Alan (2003). Paul McCartney. Sanctuary Publishing Limited. ISBN 1-86074-482-6.
- Everett, Walter (1999). The Beatles as Musicians: Revolver Through the Anthology. Oxford University Press. ISBN 978-0-19-512941-0.
- Haugen, David (2004). The Beatles. Greenhaven Press. ISBN 0-7377-2595-8.
- Hertsgaard, Mark (1996). A Day in the Life: The Music and Artistry of the Beatles. London: Pan Books. ISBN 0-330-33891-9.
- Heylin, Clinton (2007). The Act You've Known for All These Years: A Year in the Life of Sgt. Pepper and Friends. New York, NY: Canongate. ISBN 978-1-84195-918-4.
- Julien, Oliver (2008). Sgt. Pepper and the Beatles: It Was Forty Years Ago Today. Ashgate Publishing. ISBN 978-0-7546-6708-7.
- Lewisohn, Mark (2005) [1988]. The Complete Beatles Recording Sessions: The Official Story of the Abbey Road Years 1962–1970. London: Bounty Books. ISBN 978-0-7537-2545-0.
- MacDonald, Ian (2005). Revolution in the Head: The Beatles' Records and the Sixties (2nd rev. ed.). London: Pimlico. ISBN 1-84413-828-3.
- Riley, Tim (2011). Lennon: The Man, the Myth, the Music – The Definitive Life. Random House. ISBN 978-1-4481-1319-4.
- Schaffner, Nicholas (1978). The Beatles Forever. New York, NY: McGraw-Hill. ISBN 0-07-055087-5.
- Winn, John C. (2009). That Magic Feeling: The Beatles' Recorded Legacy, Volume Two, 1966–1970. New York, NY: Three Rivers Press. ISBN 978-0-307-45239-9.
- Womack, Kenneth (2007). Long and Winding Roads: The Evolving Artistry of the Beatles. New York, NY: Continuum. ISBN 978-0-8264-1746-6.
