= Matthew Melton =

American singer-songwriter

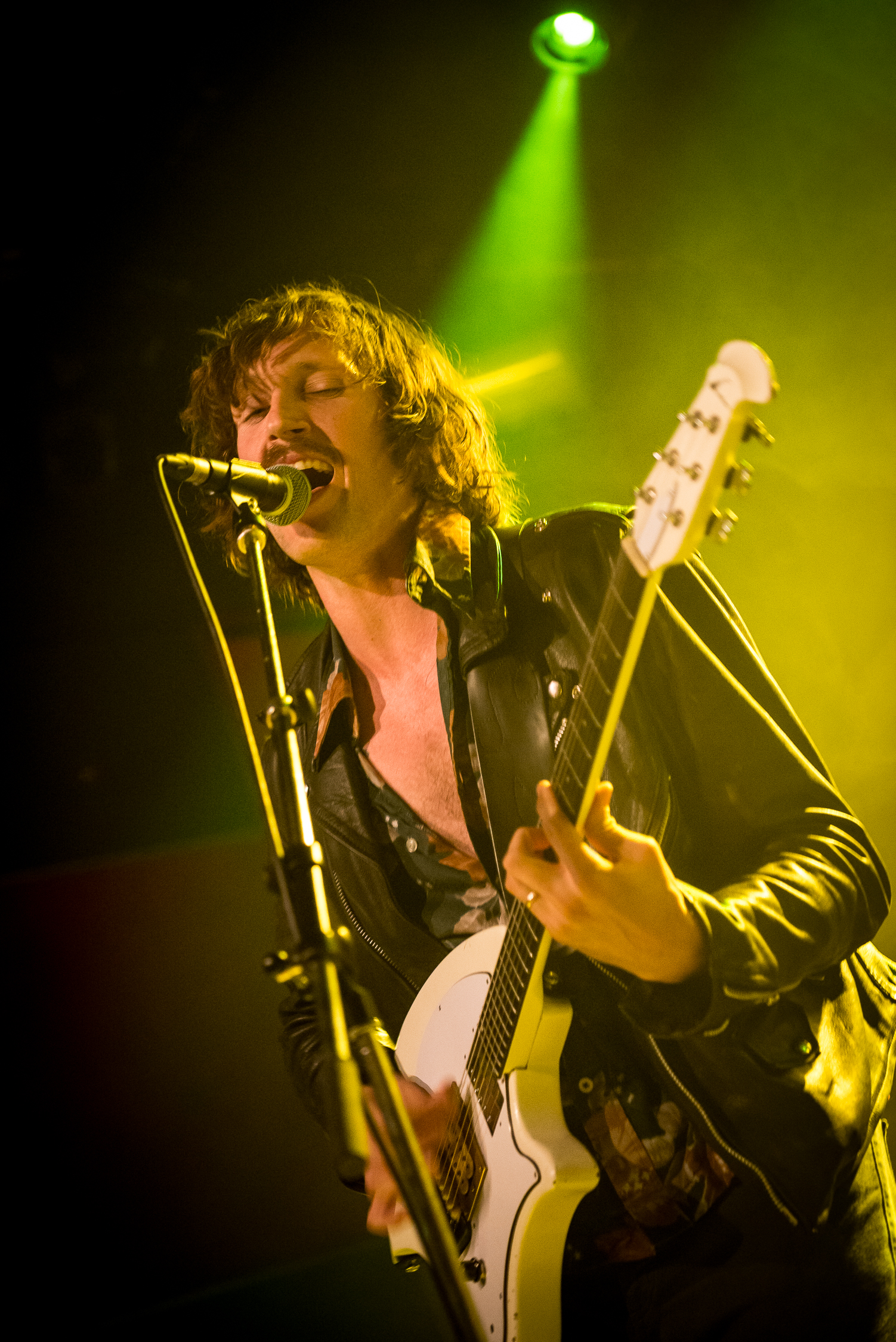

Background information
- Born: Matthew Michael Melton; November 10, 1982 (age 43); Memphis, Tennessee, U.S.
- Genres: Rock, pop, garage, glam, lo-fi
- Occupations: Musician, songwriter, record producer
- Instruments: Vocals, guitar, bass
- Years active: 2004–present
- Labels: Castle Face Records, Burger Records, Tic Tac Totally

Matthew Michael Melton (born November 10, 1982) is an American musician, songwriter and producer. Best known as the vocalist, guitarist and songwriter for Warm Soda, he also previously fronted Dream Machine with his then wife Doris, Bare Wires, Snake Flower 2 and Pleasers. Melton has also released solo material.

In 2012, Melton set up independent record label and recording studio Fuzz City where he is noted to have recorded and produced the majority of his music.

== Early life ==
Melton was born in Memphis, Tennessee. His family is from the English town of Melton Mowbray in Leicestershire, who settled in West Memphis, Arkansas, in the 1900s. At an early age he was trained as an opera singer and performed in various operas including Carmen and Tosca. He also performed in a children's back up choir for John Denver. He attended Memphis College of Art, where for his senior thesis he presented a series of photographs of every high school cafeteria in Memphis, entitled Cafeterium. Melton staged his own arrest at the gallery showing of his senior thesis under the pretence that "the photographs were taken illegitimately". To obtain his diploma, he was forced to write a letter of apology for the incident.

Around this time, Melton briefly played bass in the River City Tanlines with Lost Sounds frontwoman Alicja Trout and performed with own band, the Memphis Break-Ups, while booking shows for Memphis venue XY&Z. In 2006, he photographed Jay Reatard for the cover of his first solo album, Blood Visions. He was diagnosed with Asperger syndrome in his late 20s.

== Career ==
=== Snake Flower 2/Bare Wires (2007–2012) ===
In 2007, Melton left Memphis for California and eventually settled in San Francisco. He formed Snake Flower 2, and released a handful of singles before releasing debut album Renegade Daydream in 2008. The band featured a revolving lineup, with the album recording featuring drummer Will Axe and bassist Donelle Malnik. Melton described the album as being "the first batch of songs I wrote after I escaped from the South".

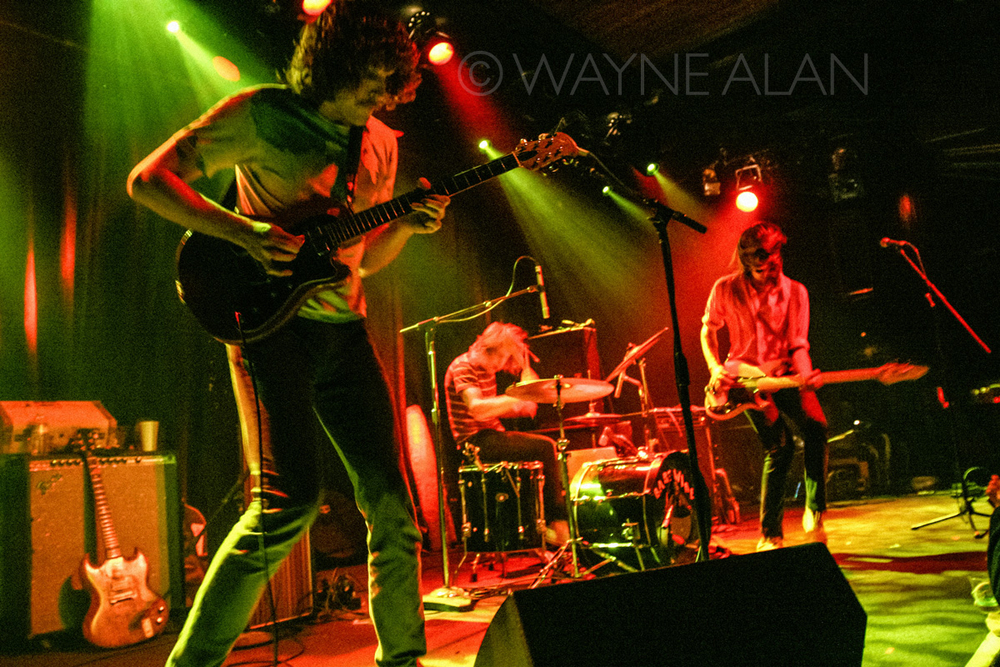
Bare Wires performing live, 2010

After relocating to Oakland, Melton reformed Bare Wires which originated in his home state and initially featured bassist Paul Keelan and drummer Erin Emslie, who was replaced by Heather Fedewa. The band's first album Artificial Clouds was released in 2009. The album was self-produced by Melton, and recorded on a Tascam 388 analog multitrack which he purchased after using one on the Snake Flower 2 album. It was also mastered by the late Jay Reatard in exchange for writing, recording, and producing the Hunx and His Punx single Teardrops on my Telephone to be released on his label, Shattered Records. Melton described the band's sound as "smooth punk." By the second album the band featured drummer Nathan Price and bassist Fletcher Johnson. They went on to release a further 3 albums, Seeking Love in 2010, Cheap Perfume in 2011 and Idle Dreams in 2012 and went through several line-up changes. The band toured relentlessly, with Melton admitting that "basically all I want is to play with people who enjoy touring, which means that you can't have a job and you can't have a girlfriend".

The band imploded in 2012, after drummer Omar Hernandez was hospitalised following an overdose (which Melton originally referred to as being a "self-induced health-related concern") and the band were forced to use a replacement drummer for their shows at that years SXSW festival in Austin, Texas The band struggled through their sets with Tony Leal of the band Part Time on drums who they were teaching the songs "on the fly" and immediately disbanded and cancelled the remainder of their tour following the festival. Melton reportedly travelled back to Oakland by himself, and announced that "Bare Wires is over - some things aren't made to go forever".

=== Warm Soda (2012–2017) ===
On returning to Oakland, Melton formed Warm Soda. Melton employed another revolving lineup, with the band initially featuring drummer Sam Lefebvre and guitarist Rob Good with Melton on vocals and bass. The lineup recorded the band's debut single Reaction. The band released debut album Someone for You in March 2013 via John Dwyer's label Castle Face Records. The album was recorded with Frank Ene on bass. By the time they toured the album, the lineup featured bassist Chase Oren Asmussen and drummer Ian McBrayer along with Melton and Good. The album was recorded and produced by Melton and Good at their home studio Fuzz City.

In 2014, the band released their second album Young Reckless Hearts and featured Chase Oren Asmussen on bass Melton commented on the album, that "I sort of over produced it, over thought it. Honestly I can't stand how this album came out. I was so frustrated with problems between band members that I mixed certain songs badly on purpose". Following the release of the album, Melton "kicked out Chase Oren, the bass player, and after dismissing him from the group it sort of came to a turning point for the band. It was also a turning point in my life". He disbanded the current lineup of the band and relocated to Austin, Texas, where he got a job at the Hotel Vegas venue and then formed a new lineup featuring drummer Caleb Dawson, bassist Austin "Shock" Shockley and guitarist Max Eaton who played their first show together on July 5 at Hotel Vegas.

Commenting further on the move, Melton stated that "a lot of the move had to do with my wife. On the last Warm Soda tour I met and fell in love with, at first sight, my wife Doris, in Rotterdam. We came back to Oakland, but with the rising housing costs and all things considered we couldn't do it". Doris, who was born in Bosnia but raised in the Netherlands, contributed keyboards to Warm Soda's subsequent albums.

In 2014 Warm Soda performed live on Last Call with Carson Daly.

The band released third album Symbolic Dream in April 2015, with Melton stating that the album "holds onto a lot of good elements that might have been present on the first album. I feel like I'm in a continual process of refining and further refining my sound in kind of a compressed bubblegum, glam glitter fuzz". The band toured Europe with guitarist Alex Capistran.

Ousted bass player Chase Oren Asmussen died on June 11, 2016.

In February 2017, the band's fourth and final studio album I Don't Wanna Grow Up was announced. Released in April 2017, Melton did not perform any Warm Soda shows to promote the album and it peaked at #25 on the Muzooka college radio chart.

=== Dream Machine (2017–present) ===
Issued simultaneously with the last Warm Soda album, Melton released the debut album for new band Dream Machine in May 2017. The band features his Bosnian-born wife Doris Melton on organ and synthesizer, along with Rudy Spencer on bass and Dillon Fernandez on drums. Promoting the album, the couple revealed that they were moving from the US to live in the Netherlands, which was where Doris had lived before her marriage. Doris Melton commented that "American musicians (hopefully not Europe too) are getting increasingly politically correct and it started getting on our nerves. Living in Austin also was getting more and more expensive", with Matthew Melton adding that he was "so excited to be moving to Europe, but I will always consider myself a red-blooded American. And just like the waves of refugees pouring into Europe I will also not be learning any new languages or culturally assimilating. We're bringing Austin to Amsterdam" He and Doris criticized social media, illegal immigration, feminist bands and promiscuity.

On June 23, 2017, Castle Face Records announced via their Facebook page that they had dropped the band due to views that were expressed by Doris and Matthew Melton in their interview with the French website Still In Rock in May 2017, deeming them to be "some ugly opinions". The label alleged that they had been unaware of the contents of the interview despite linking to it themselves at the time, until it was brought to their attention over a month later. The band responded to the label's decision by stating that "we know in our hearts that we aren't racists or fascists and we fully denounce all forms of hatred and intolerance" and that "this will not hold us back and we will continue to make music and want to thank all the people that are standing up for us, we truly appreciate it". They also revealed that they were dropped immediately without being given any opportunity to explain or defend the interview and that the label refused to post the band's response despite the request in the label's press release.

After departing Castle Face, Matthew's Fuzz City label took over distribution of the band. In the fall, Melton released his solo album Night Life, which was already planned for release at the time of the controversy. Dream Machine then released its second album, Breaking the Circle, in late 2017 (Matthew's fourth album released in 2017). Band membership now consisted of Matthew on guitars and bass, Doris on piano and synthesizer, and Oskar Mead on drums.

== Discography ==
Snake Flower 2

Albums

- Renegade Daydream – CD/LP (2008, Tic Tac Totally!), Cassette (2010, Southpaw)

Singles

- "Turn Back Time" – 7" (2006, Shake Your Ass)
- "Talk About It" – 7" (2008, Tic Tac Totally)
- "Biker Psych" – 7" (2008, Red Lounge)
- "Things Seem" – 7" (2009, Iekk! Sounds)
- "Memory Castle" – 7" (2011, Southpaw)

Bare Wires

Albums

- Artificial Clouds – LP (2009, Tic Tac Totally), Cassette (2010, Southpaw)
- Seeking Love – CD/LP (2010, Castle Face), Cassette (2010, Burger Records)
- Cheap Perfume – CD/10" (2011, Southpaw)
- Idle Dreams – LP (2012, Southpaw), Cassette (2012, Burger Records)
- Bare Wires Live at Burger Records – Cassette (2011, Burger Records)
- Bare Wires Greatest Hits – Cassette (2014, Fuzz City)

Singles

- "Voo Doo Doll" – 7" (2007, Solid Sex Lovie Doll)
- "Let Down" – 7" (2009, Milk nʼ Herpes)
- "Young Love" – 7" (2010, Southpaw)
- "Don't Ever Change" – 7" (2011, Robot Elephant)

Compilation appearances

- Group Flex (Contribute Tracks: "Wanna Fight, the Right Time") – 6 x Flexi Disc/Book (2011, Castle Face)

Warm Soda

Albums

- Someone for You – CD/LP (2013, Castle Face Records, CF-016), Cassette (2013, Burger Records)
- Young Reckless Hearts – CD/LP (2014, Castle Face Records, CF-036), Cassette (2014, Lolipop Records)
- Symbolic Dream – CD/LP (2015, Castle Face Records, CF-054), Cassette (2015, Burger Records)
- I Don't Wanna Grow Up – CD/LP (2017, Castle Face Records, CF-088)

Singles

- "Reaction" – 7" (2012, Southpaw Records)
- "Lost for Words" – 7" Flexidisc (2013, Castle Face)
- "Tell Me in a Whisper" – 7" (2013, Goodbye Boozy)
- "Renegade Mode" – Cassingle (2013, Fuzz City)
- "Renegade Mode" – 7" (2015 Southpaw Records)

Compilation appearances

- Group Flex II: Son of Flex (Contribute Track: "Lost for Words") – 6 x Flexi Disc/Book (2012, Castle Face Records)
- Castle Face Records and Friends – The Velvet Underground & Nico (Contribute Track: "I'm Waiting for the Man") – LP (2012, Castle Face Records)
- I Need You Bad – (Contribute Track: "Tell Me in a Whisper") – CD/LP (2013, Polyvinyl Record Company)
- Noise to the World – Converse Holiday Music (Contribute Track: "Without You By My Side") – CD/LP (2013 Converse)
- Summer of Fuzz Volume 2 (Contribute Track: "Tell Me in a Whisper") – Cassette (2013, Fuzz City Records)
- While No One Was Looking: Toasting 20 Years of Bloodshot Records (Contribute Track: "All Grown Up") – CD/LP (2014 Bloodshot Records)

Solo

Albums

- Still Misunderstood – LP (2009, Southpaw Records), Cassette (2009, LNA Records)
- Outside of Paradise – CD/LP (2014, Southpaw Records)
- Night Life – CD/LP (2017, Fuzz City Records, FUZZ 012)

Singles

- "Too Many Hearts Lack Lovers" – 7" (2015, Southpaw Records)

Dream Machine

Albums

- The Illusion – CD/LP (2017, Castle Face Records, CF-089; Fuzz City Records, FUZZ 013)
- Breaking the Circle – CD/LP (2017, Fuzz City Records, FUZZ 014)

Pleasers

Singles

- "Reject Teen" – 7" (2015, Southpaw Records)
- "Leading Me On" – 7" (2016, Southpaw Records)
- "Such a Fool" – 7" (2016, Goodbye Boozy)

Other appearances

- River City Tanlines – "Black Knight" – 7" (2004, Misprint Records)
- River City Tanlines – "Gimme Whatever" – 7" (2005, Goodbye Boozy)
- Photobooth – "Pretty Baby" – 7" (2008, Raw Deluxe Records)
- Photobooth – "Da Me Tus Besos" – 7" (2008, Daggerman Records)
- Shannon and The Clams – I Wanna Go Home CD/LP (2009, 1-2-3-4 Go! Records)
- Hunx And His Punx – "Teardrops on my Telephone" – 7" (2009, Shattered Records)
- The Sandwitches – "Summer of Love" – 7" (2010, 1-2-3-4 Go! Records)
- Nectarine Pie – "Dreamdaze" – 7" (2011, Southpaw)
- Sic Alps – "Can't You See" – 7" (2011, Drag City)
- Younger Lovers – "4/4 Kick & Let The Beat Ride" – 7" (2011 Southpaw)
- Burnt Ones – "Protection Circle" – 7" (2012, Fuzz City)
- Cocktails – Adult Life – LP (2014, Father/Daughter Records)
- Steve Adamyk Band – Dial Tone – CD/LP (2014, Dirtnap)
- BBQT – "Inmate" – 7" (2016, No Front Teeth Records)
