= Muzooka Radio Chart =

Radio chart

The Muzooka Radio Chart
- Website type: Record chart
- Available in: English
- Website: radiocharts.muzooka.com
- Launched: February 2017

The Muzooka Radio Chart is a weekly Top 500 radio chart.

== History ==
Muzooka began as a streaming site in the early 2010s before the organization launched its Top 500 radio chart. The Top 500 radio chart was launched in February 2017. After the dissolution of CMJ in 2017, Muzooka has become one of the primary sources for the publication of college radio airplay. In 2019, iHeartRadio added Muzooka to its chart reporting.

== Charts ==
Muzooka publishes both a weighted and an unweighted radio chart.
