= Big Daddy (band) =

American comedic rock band

- Origin: Los Angeles, California, United States
- Genres: Comedy rock, parody, novelty
- Years active: 1975–2012; 2013–present
- Labels: Oglio Records, Rhino Records
- Past members: 1991 line-up Bob Wayne; Marty Kaniger; Tom Lee; Don Raymond; John Hatton; Norman A. Norman; Bob Sandman; Damon D. Grignon

Big Daddy is an American comedy rock band formed in Los Angeles, California. They were among the first groups to create mashups—in this case, of "oldies" music and modern pop songs. The members of the band are voice actors, best known for portraying the voices of the animals in Lincoln Park Zoo, an animated short produced throughout the 1980s.

== History ==
Big Daddy was formed as an oldies cover band in Los Angeles in the 1970s as "Big Daddy Dipstick and the Lube Jobs". They later started playing mashups, which were released on Rhino Records.

In 1983 the group provided backup vocals on Richard Berry's note-for-note remake of "Louie Louie" for Rhino's The Best of Louie, Louie compilation album because licensing could not be obtained for the original version.

As with "Weird Al" Yankovic, the band had its first breakthrough on the Doctor Demento Show. They placed twice on Stereophile's 'Records to Die For' list of albums, consecutively in 1994 and 1995.

In 2012 the reformed band raised over $36,000 through Kickstarter to record the album Smashing Songs of Stage and Screen. The same year, choreographer Adam Houghland used music from Big Daddy's catalog for his contemporary ballet piece, Mashup.

== Filmography ==
- Lincoln Park Zoo (1986) ... Rhinoceros/Lion/Giraffe/Penguin/Alligator/Gorilla/Turtle/Snake/Ostrich/Elephant (voice)

== Discography ==
=== Albums ===
Studio albums

- Big Daddy (1983)
- Meanwhile... Back in the States (1985)
- Cutting Their Own Groove (1991)
- Sgt. Pepper's (1992)
- Chantmania (as The Benzedrine Monks of Santo Domonica) (1994)
- The Best of Big Daddy (2000)
- Smashing Songs of Stage and Screen (2013)
- Cruisin' Through the Rhino Years (2014)

=== EPs ===
- Dancing in the Dark (EP) - 1985 (Making Waves Records) - UK #21
  - "I Write the Songs"
  - "Bette Davis Eyes"
  - "Dancing in the Dark"
  - "Eye of the Tiger"
