= Re-recording (music) =

Recording produced following a new performance of a work of music

A re-recording is a recording produced following a new performance of a work of music. This is most commonly, but not exclusively, by a popular artist or group. It differs from a reissue, which involves a second or subsequent release of a previously recorded piece of music.

Re-recordings are often produced decades after the original recordings were released, usually under contract terms more favorable to the artists. This is especially common among acts who originally agreed to contracts that would be considered unfair and exploitative today. When re-recordings are issued under newer contracts, artists can collect far higher royalties for use in films, commercials, and movie trailers. Other artists re-record their work for artistic reasons. Jeff Lynne of the Electric Light Orchestra released a solo best-of album with new versions of previous hits like "Mr. Blue Sky", the original of which Lynne described as "[not] quite how I meant it". Some artists, such as Def Leppard and Taylor Swift, re-recorded their music because of disputes with their labels; Swift's re-recordings have become massive successes, both critically and commercially.

Re-recordings commonly appear in online music stores and streaming services, such as the iTunes Store and Spotify.

== Recording contracts ==
Recording contracts are a way in which the ownership of sound recordings can be legally recognised. Recording contracts are often between an artist and a record label and stipulate terms relating to royalties, performance rights and recording costs. The motivation behind the re-recording of music is often associated with the legal ownership of the music and how that ownership can bring financial gains to an artist, especially if initial contract terms are financially unfavourable. Different types of recording contracts exist, and a newer model that focuses on paying the artist a prolonged salary for limited ownership of their music is becoming favourable with high profile artists such as Madonna. This new model is often seen as fairer to artists, especially financially. The internet has also given artists more power in negotiating fairer recording contracts, or even self-publishing music directly onto streaming platforms. An element of risk associated with record labels and up-and-coming artists is offered as an explanation for why record contracts can often be seen as unfavourable but necessary to avoid financial losses over time. Recording contracts are a fundamental part of the music industry and recording music, especially for commercial purposes. They serve as a way for artists to negotiate ownership of their music and for profits to be made and leveraged.

Even though recording contracts are between an artist and the record label, they often involve the ownership of rights to specific recordings of music, as is the case with Taylor Swift. Swift signed with her first record label, Big Machine Records, in 2005, when she was not even considered an adult, and released six albums under that contract. Her record contract expired in 2018 and she signed with a new record label, UMG. Big Machine Records was sold one year later and Swift’s master recordings for her first six albums followed the sale, leading Swift to re-record those albums. A similar record label contractual dispute is evident with Prince. He was unable to own his master recordings, so he went so far as to change his name to a symbol and tried to release music under that in hopes that he would own the master recordings for those albums if his name was not Prince. This did not work but in 2014 the record label gave Prince back his master recordings after he held a public campaign shaming them. Prince was also one of the first artists to utilise the internet as a way to release music without the involvement of record labels. In using the internet as a way of controlling the release of his music, Prince acted as inspiration for other artists to think about how they want to release their music, particularly in the face of contractual battles, even extending to re-recording of music.

== Music copyright ==
Music copyright refers to protecting a recorded piece of music so that it cannot be reproduced or used without permission of the artist or copyright holder. Unlike copyright for films, music copyright focuses on the author of the piece of music and the sound within the music, not moving images. This means that another individual or machine can reproduce a piece of music without causing copyright infringement, as long as the original recording is not used. This is particularly relevant to re-recording of music as it allows artists to record the same song later as a newer version or a special edition and own that independently.

As the internet has evolved, copyright in music has been put at risk and forced to adapt. The digital landscape has changed the way in which music is shared and for what price, leading to music piracy threatening the legitimacy and control that copyright holders have over their music. Piracy has enabled the sharing of music with the click of a button for no monetary value. This has forced copyright laws to adapt to circumstances such as piracy to protect an artist’s intellectual property. Music copyright can provide an artist with freedom to license and re-record music but is constantly open to vulnerabilities from evolving technology.

== Notable examples ==
=== Stereo re-recordings ===
Stereo or hi-fi recordings gained immense popularity in the late 1950s and early 1960s, with mono recordings gradually being completely phased out by record companies by the end of the 1960s. With recordings having been made and issued in single-channel mono up to that point, some artists re-recorded some of their most famous songs so they would be available for purchase in the new stereo format. Sometimes these artists re-recorded their material for the same label, as with June Christy, whose 1955 album Something Cool was entirely re-recorded in stereo for Capitol in 1960, or Ray Conniff, who in 1969 re-recorded a stereo version of "S'Wonderful", a song he had recorded for Columbia in mono in 1956. As well in the late 1950s, a number of dance bands (including the bands of Tommy Dorsey, Harry James, Benny Goodman, Artie Shaw and others) issued stereo re-recordings of their best-known songs for a range of different labels.

Perhaps the most commercially successful stereo re-recording was Tommy Edwards' "It's All In The Game". Edwards' original (mono) 1951 version reached No. 18 on the Billboard Records Most Played by Disk Jockeys survey dated September 15, 1951. By 1958, Edwards had only one session left on his MGM contract, and it was decided to cut a stereo version of "It's All in the Game" to have a stereo master available of the artist's most well-remembered recording. The re-recorded performance was issued as a single in July 1958 and became a hit, reaching number one for six weeks beginning September 29, 1958, making Edwards the first African-American to chart at number one on the Billboard Hot 100. In November, the song hit No. 1 on the UK Singles Chart.

=== The Everly Brothers ===
In 1960, The Everly Brothers left Cadence Records, where they had recorded a string of hits from 1957 to 1960. One of their earliest actions for their new label, Warner Brothers, was to re-record new versions of their most popular Cadence songs. The new versions of their Cadence songs were joined with their first hits on the WB label to form a new "Greatest Hits" album issued on WB, the album being the 1964 release "The Very Best of the Everly Brothers." In re-recording their music, The Everly Brothers set a precedent that is still widely used in recording contracts today.

=== Taylor Swift ===
When Taylor Swift originally signed to her prior record label, Big Machine, in 2005, she forfeited ownership of her master recordings. Swift was a teenager when she signed away the ownership of those recordings, and in the years following expressed feelings of resentment and frustration feeling her music should belong to her. Swift was advised by her lawyers that she could start the process of re-recording her old albums and release them as newer versions, after her contract with Big Machine expired in 2018. Following the American businessman Scooter Braun's purchase of Big Machine (and the ownership of the masters along with it) after Swift moved to Republic Records, she announced that she would re-record her first six studio albums. This coincided with the release of her seventh studio album, Lover (2019), the first she owns the masters of. Swift has been an advocate for artists to own their music and be aware of contractual terms that are unfavorable towards them, based on her own experiences. Her dispute with Big Machine and Braun was highly publicized and triggered an industry discourse on ethics, musicians' rights, and intellectual property.

Swift's re-recorded albums consist of Fearless (Taylor's Version) (2021), Red (Taylor's Version) (2021), Speak Now (Taylor's Version) (2023), and 1989 (Taylor's Version) (2023). In addition to re-recordings of songs featured on their respective original records, the albums also contain previously unreleased songs which are noted "From the Vault". The re-recordings have become critical and commercial successes. The ownership of Swift's albums under Big Machine was sold back to her on May 30, 2025; that same day, the singer revealed that she had finished re-recording Taylor Swift (2006) but hadn't "even re-recorded a quarter" of Reputation (2017); both the Taylor Swift re-recording and the Reputation "From the Vault" tracks remained up for a possible release.

=== Def Leppard ===
Def Leppard believed they were not receiving adequate remuneration for the digital versions of their albums and songs, and they also believed that an artist should receive the same amount of royalties from digital copies that they receive from physical copies of CDs and vinyl records sold. The band states they have paid back the money owed to their record label UMG and that modifications made to their recording contract over the years have given them the unique position of being able to control via an approval process the way in which their music is sold and distributed.

The band feels as though they have not been treated fairly by their record label, so in a move to reassert their power they have decided to re-record their popular hits and release them digitally so as to provide themselves with a fair share of the profits compared to what their record label was willing to offer them in negotiations. The band referred to these re-recordings as “forgeries” and the first to be released were two of their most popular songs “Pour Some Sugar on Me” and “Rock of Ages”, which they re-recorded in their own home studio. These songs made over $40,000 for the band from online sales alone and the option of use in advertising, television and movies is listed as a possibility for the band to further capitalise on the re-recorded material.

== Further examples ==
- In 1947, Bing Crosby re-recorded "White Christmas" as the master of the original version had been damaged. The re-recording is the version commonly heard on Christmas radio today.
- Throughout the 1960s and 1970s, K-tel released music compilations including re-recordings of songs by the original artists.
- Cleopatra Records is an American record label that has also released compilation albums with re-recordings of songs, through its sublabels X-Ray Records and Goldenlane Records.
- Curb Records has also released re-recordings of songs by country singers from the 1960s and 1970s.
- In 1981, UK glam rock band Wizzard re-recorded their Christmas classic "I Wish It Could Be Christmas Everyday" as the 1973 original was lost.
- In 1990, The Righteous Brothers' 1965 recording of "Unchained Melody" was featured in the movie Ghost and released as a single by Verve Records, but only on vinyl. The Righteous Brothers then re-recorded the song for Curb Records which released the re-recording as a cassette single. Both recordings charted in the top 20 of the Billboard Hot 100 simultaneously, the Verve recording charting primarily based on airplay and the Curb re-recording primarily based on sales.
- A few artists have re-recorded their songs for the Guitar Hero video game franchise, including Living Colour, Sex Pistols, Aerosmith, MC5, Motörhead, Third Eye Blind, Spacehog, Love and Rockets, Alice Cooper, and The Runaways. According to Sex Pistols vocalist Johnny Rotten, the original master tapes for "Anarchy in the U.K.", which contained multitracks for the instruments, had been lost. For "Kick Out the Jams", MC5 guitarist Wayne Kramer teamed up with guitarists Jerry Cantrell and Gilby Clarke to re-record the song using the original voice track of Rob Tyner, who had died in 1991.
- In 2010, the British group Squeeze re-recorded a selection of their singles which were originally released between 1978 and 1993. The resulting album title, Spot the Difference, suggests a comparison to the original recordings. Squeeze co-founder Glenn Tilbrook co-produced the new recordings using equipment he had saved from the originals. Former Squeeze member Paul Carrack returned to sing "Tempted" for the project.
- After changing their name from Peterpan in 2012, Noah re-recorded most of their songs from the Peterpan era with the exception of songs written by former members, naming the project "Second Chance" and citing several reasons: wanting their old song to be released under Noah name, a desire to improve the recordings since some songs were not recorded the way they wished, and in order to properly adapt their old songs to digital format. The first album from the project, Second Chance, was released in 2014 and contained re-recordings of songs from Peterpan's albums Alexandria and Sebuah Nama, Sebuah Cerita. The re-recorded version of Peterpan's albums Taman Langit, Bintang di Surga, and Hari yang Cerah was planned to be released in 2015, but the release got delayed until December 2021–February 2022.
- Namie Amuro re-recorded 39 singles for her 2017 compilation album Finally before retiring from the music industry.
- In 2018, JoJo re-recorded her Blackground Records albums because of a dispute with the label, which involved her first two albums being withheld from streaming and digital services. However, in 2021, her original catalog has been made available after the revival of the label.
- Car Seat Headrest's 2018 album Twin Fantasy (Face to Face) is a re-recording of 2011's Twin Fantasy. The 2018 version is a full band recording in a studio, with updated production. The latter was subtitled (Mirror to Mirror) after the former's release.
- American duo Aly & AJ have re-recorded three songs from their albums with Hollywood Records, including an explicit version of their 2007 single "Potential Breakup Song" after widespread use on TikTok and requests by fans.
- In 2021, Paula Cole re-recorded her 1997 single "I Don't Want to Wait", popular for being the broadcast theme of the television series Dawson's Creek, due to licensing issues that had prevented the song from being used on DVD and streaming services.
- In 2021, American singer-songwriter Michelle Branch decided to celebrate the 20th anniversary of her sophomore album, The Spirit Room, by re-recording the album and pressing it on vinyl for the first time.
- In 2022, American group Echosmith re-recorded their 2013 hit "Cool Kids" after the song's resurgence on TikTok. The song, titled "Cool Kids (our version)" includes a new bridge and an indie rock style.
- In 2022, R&B singer-songwriter Ashanti had plans to re-record her debut eponymous album after twenty years, following contractual conflicts over master and publishing rights with her record label and/or Irv Gotti.
- In 2022, Australian christian worship band Planetshakers released a new popular song "Nothing Is Impossible" was re-recorded during a sold-out concert on September 8-11, 2022 in Manila and Pasay, Philippines.
- In 2023, American singer, songwriter and actress Demi Lovato re-recorded ten of her previous hits into rock versions and created the remix album Revamped, following her return to rock with Holy Fvck (2022). The remix album showed off her vocal range and abilities, with the highest note she hit in the album being a C#6 in "Confident" as the original had the high note of Bb5. Singles from the album are rock versions of "Heart Attack", "Cool for the Summer", "Sorry Not Sorry' that also features Slash, and "Confident". She also collaborated with The Maine on the rock version of "Neon Lights", Nita Strauss on the rock version of "La La Land", and Robbietheused on the rock version of "Give Your Heart a Break". Lovato has also made rock versions of "Tell Me You Love Me", "Skyscraper", and "Don't Forget".
- In 2025, American singer Rachel Platten re-recorded four songs from her 2015 album Wildfire, after she lost ownership of the masters. These included the singles "Fight Song" and "Stand by You". Inspired by Taylor Swift's re-recordings, the project also includes one "From the Vault" track.

== Re-recording and historical preservation ==
Re-recording of music is useful in understanding how sounds and recordings from the past have influenced history and can also be a way to preserve history. Early sound recordings can be traced back to 1888 in England, highlighting the historical trajectory of recordings and scope available for preservation. Due to the fragile nature of sound recordings, especially in the past on vinyl and tapes, historical artefacts have been lost including voice recordings of Emperor Franz Josef. Re-recording of music can help in aiding the reproduction of lost voice recordings and music, with many universities using the latest technology to try and preserve history from remnants that are left. Technological advances have enabled sound specialists to draw larger quantities of sounds from old recordings as time passes, making it possible for sounds to be heard that have never been heard before. Recordings from the past can also be improved thanks to re-recording of music, allowing sound specialists the chance to reduce background noise or noise from older style microphones to enable clearer understanding of speech and tone, providing greater understanding and meaning to the recordings. The process of re-recording is therefore attributed to enabling the historic preservation of the past in sound form for future generations to study. This is useful not only in a historical context, but additionally for law enforcement and legal fields where evidence is needed.

The Library of Congress in the United States is an example of an institution that is working to ensure that sound recordings, such as those with historical significance such as Martin Luther King's "I Have a Dream" speech are preserved for generations to listen to in the future. A department is in place at the library dedicated to the historical preservation of audio recordings and it has been working for decades. However, a problem that historians at the library cite is that often these recordings can be very old, and it is time critical that they be preserved before they are lost due to heat exposure or breakage from not being handled properly. The library is able to get past these problems and preserve them for future generations by digitising their collection, which preserves the audio if the original is lost and it allows for wider accessibility of the audio. The library is acquiring around 50,000 to 100,000 new audio sources for preservation from the general public each calendar year whilst it is only able to preserve and upload to the digital collection around 15,000 per year. The library staff are having to make sure that the rest are placed in environments that are able to conserve and slow down the deterioration of the original audio sources until they can digitise them, however many have been lost such as historical radio recordings that were dubbed an important piece of society's "sociocultural heritage".

== See also ==
- Remix
- Remake
- Cover version
- Sampling (music)
- Full-album performance
