= Victor Axelrod =

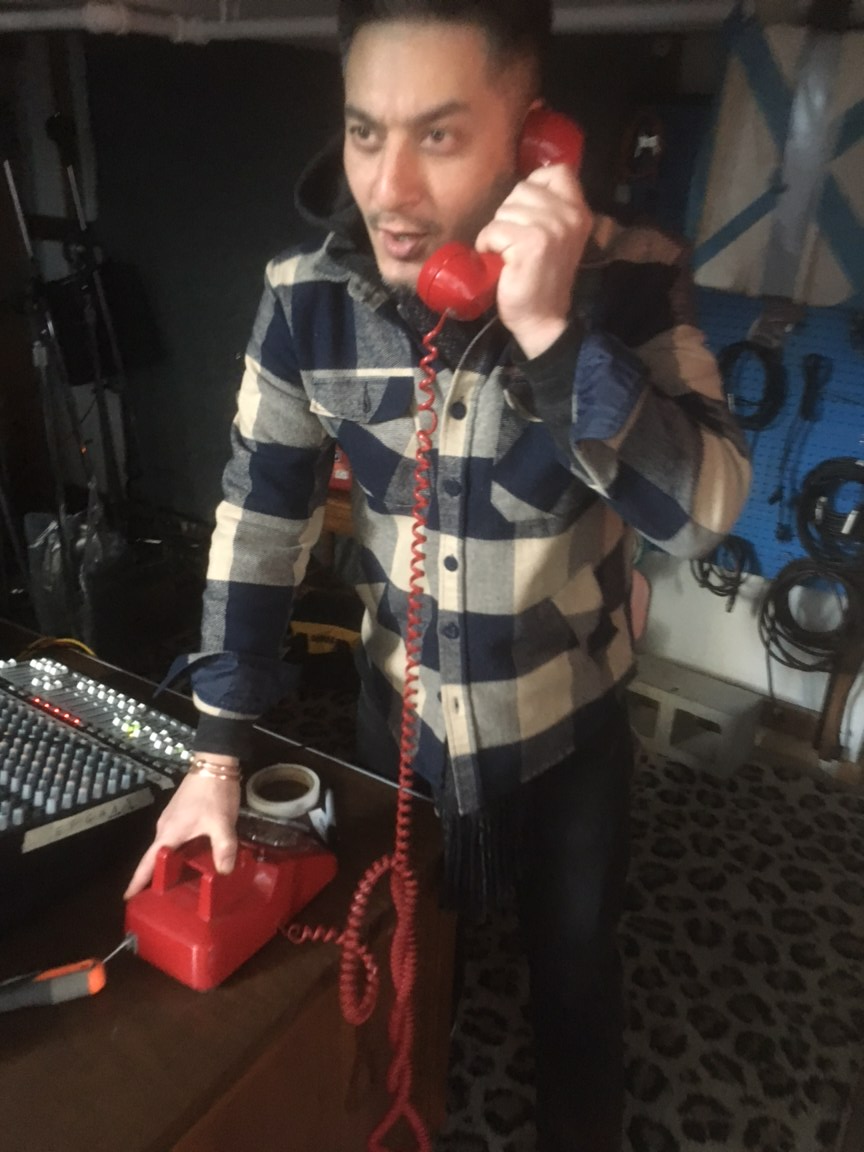
- Axelrod at work in 2020

Background information
- Also known as: Ticklah, Earl Maxton, Calbert Walker, Douglass & Degraw
- Origin: Brooklyn, New York, United States
- Genres: Reggae, Rocksteady, Soul music, Funk music, Afrobeat, Pop rock
- Occupations: Musician, Record Producer, Audio Engineer, DJ
- Instruments: Piano, organ, keyboards, drums, bass guitar, guitar, percussion
- Labels: Daptone Records, Liondub 45, Names You Can Trust, Mad Decent, Easy Star Records

Victor Axelrod is an American musician, producer, and audio engineer from Brooklyn, New York. Since the mid-1990s, he has worked primarily in the genres of reggae, Afrobeat and soul, recording and producing under his own name and using the alias Ticklah.

Axelrod became a founding member of Antibalas and Sharon Jones & the Dap-Kings after meeting musicians Martin Perna and Gabe Roth (a.k.a. Bosco Mann) in the late 1990s.

Starting in 1996, Axelrod appeared as a session musician playing keyboards for Easy Star Records, a New York City independent reggae label. This studio relationship eventually resulted in him taking on the role of co-producer and engineer of the label's release Dub Side of the Moon, a 2003 dub reggae reinterpretation of the Pink Floyd album The Dark Side of the Moon recorded by the Easy Star All-Stars.

By 2002, both Sharon Jones and the Dap-Kings and Antibalas had begun touring and were in high demand. Being in both bands was no longer feasible, so Axelrod decided to focus his attention solely on Antibalas. However, he continued to occasionally appear on subsequent recordings playing keyboard and organ for Sharon Jones and the Dap-Kings. Axelrod eventually left Antibalas in 2013.

In 2006, producer Mark Ronson hired Axelrod and other members of the Dap-Kings to play on the Amy Winehouse album Back to Black. This was to be the first of many Ronson productions where he utilized Axelrod and this group of musicians. The collective appeared on three of Ronson's solo albums (Version, Record Collection, Late Night Feelings) along with soundtracks, remixes and special projects with artists including Rufus Wainwright, Lady Gaga, Adele, Daniel Merriweather, Lily Allen, Miike Snow and Erykah Badu.

In 2007, Easy Star Records released an Axelrod solo album, Ticklah vs. Axelrod, continuing his relationship with the label. The record was a mixture of instrumental, dub and vocal tracks featuring Vinia Mojica, Rob Symeonn, Tamar-kali, Mayra Vega and Mikey General.

In 2008, Axelrod remixed the popular Sharon Jones and the Dap-Kings song "How Long Do I Have to Wait for You” in a rocksteady style. Originally appearing on the Scion sampler compilation Volume 19: Daptone Records Remixed, this track was later released as a single on Daptone Records. Wanting to build on the momentum of its success, Daptone encouraged Axelrod to make more recordings for the label in a similar vein. This instigation would result in a series of singles that would feature such singers as Bob and Gene, Charles Bradley, Leon Dinero, Screechy Dan, and the band The Frightnrs.

Concurrently, in 2008, Axelrod partnered with New York City reggae and jungle DJ Liondub to release singles on his new sublabel Liondub 45. This gave Axelrod another outlet to release various reggae music he was making with both established and up-and-coming artists. Releases included collaborations between Axelrod and Sugar Minott, Judah Eskender Tafari, Jahdan Blakkemoore, Courtney John, and Victor Rice.

In 2009, some of his songs were featured in the video game Grand Theft Auto: Chinatown Wars on the in-game Ticklah radio station.

In 2011, guitarist/producer Jay Nugent enlisted Axelrod to engineer an EP that he was producing for The Frightnrs, a reggae band from Queens, NY. Following that, Axelrod began to work extensively with the group, serving as the producer and engineer on two acclaimed projects: Inna Lovers Quarrel EP which was released by Diplo’s label Mad Decent label in 2015 and the album Nothing More to Say, released by Daptone Records in 2016.

Despite their resemblance, Victor Axelrod is not related to Ray Dorset of Mungo Jerry.

== Selected discography ==
=== Production (albums) ===
2003: Easy Star All Stars - Dub Side of the Moon - Easy Star Records

2005: Antibalas - Government Magic EP - Afrosound Records

2007: Ticklah - Ticklah Vs. Axelrod - Easy Star Records

2012: Sierra Leone's Refugee All Stars - Radio Salone - Cumbancha Records

2015: The Frightnrs - Inna Lovers Quarrel - Mad Decent/The Full Hundred

2016: The Frightnrs Nothing More To Say - Daptone Records

=== Production (singles) ===
2003 : Antibalas "Che Che Cole (Makossa)" - Daptone Records 12"

2007: Ticklah featuring Mikey General "Rescue Me/Rockers Salvation" - Easy Star Records 7"

2008 Sharon Jones "How Long Do I Have To Wait For You/How Long Do I Have to Dub For You" Daptone Records 7"

2009: Ticklah featuring Rob Symeonn "Pork Eater/Pork Version" Easy Star Records 7"

2009 Jahdan Blakkemoore/Ticklah ft. Victor Rice "The General (remix)/Elimination Game" Liondub 45 7"

2009 Rob Symeonn and Ticklah "Rob I Land/One Way Road" Concent Records 12"

2012 Bob & Gene "I Can't Stand These Lonely Nights/Rub The Lamp" Daptone Records 7"

2012 Courtney John "Born To Fly/Born to Dub Liondub 45 7"

2013 Sluggy Ranks "Nah Bow Down/Wicked Dub" Liondub 45 7"

2013 Brukky "Why Yu Nuh/Why Yu Nuh" Names You Can Trust 7"

2014 Ticklah "Ya Llego" Names You Can Trust 10"

2015 The Frightnrs "I'd Rather Go Blind/Version" Daptone Records 7"

2016 The Frightnrs "Dispute/Version" Daptone Records 7"

2016 Bob and Gene featuring the Inversions "I Can Be Cool/Version" Daptone Records 7"

2017 Bob and Gene featuring the Inversions "It's Not What You Know It's Who You Know/Version" Daptone Records 7"

2018 Charles Bradley and the Inversions "Whatcha Doing (To Me)/Strike Three" Daptone Records 7"

2019 Leon Dinero "Lover Like Me/Conscience is Heavy" Daptone Records 7"

2019 The Frightnrs "Never Answer/Questions" Daptone Records 7"

2019 Leon Dinero/Screechy Dan "If You Ask Me/Bandits" Daptone Records 7"

=== Appears on ===
2006 Amy Winehouse - Back to Black - Universal Records (keyboards and handclaps)

2007 Antibalas - Security - Anti Records (keyboards)

2008 Nas -"Fried Chicken” - Def Jam (piano/co-wrote)

2009 Daniel Merriweather - Love & War - J Records (piano)

2010 The Like - Release Me - Geffen Records (organ, piano)

2010 Mark Ronson and the Business - Record Collection- RCA Records (synthesizer)

2011 Amy Winehouse - Lioness: Hidden Treasures - Island Records Group (piano)

2011 Ala Modeliste - Erykah Badu and Mark Ronson Regeneration - Hyundai (piano)

2012 Antibalas - Antibalas - Daptone Records - (organ)

2012 Rufus Wainwright - Out of the Game - Decca Records (piano)

2015 Adele - "Lay Me Down"- XL Recordings (piano)

2015 Elvis Costello "Point Of No Return" Vinyl: Music From The HBO Original Series Volume 1.9 (piano)

2016 Lady Gaga - Joanne - Interscope Records (synthesizer/piano)

2016 Charles Bradley - Changes - Daptone Records (piano, organ)

2018 Kali Uchis - Isolation - Virgin Records (piano)

2018 Mark Ronson - Late Night Feelings - RCA Records (synthesizer)

2020 James Hunter Six - Nick Of Time - Daptone Records (piano)

=== Collaborations ===
2002 DJ Spinna and Ticklah remix "Days Like This" Shaun Escoffery - Oyster Records (Remix/keyboards) )

2003 DJ Spinna "Alphonso's Thang" Here To There Rapster/BBE (Co-Wrote/ keyboards)

2009 Miike Snow "Animal" (Mark Ronson remix) Columbia (organ/mixing)

2006 DJ Spinna featuring Eric Roberson "Butterfly Girl" from Intergalactic Soul album Papa Records (Co-Wrote, Keyboards)

2014 Red Hot and Bach Dustin O’Halloran "Minim" Sony Music Masterworks (remix )

2015 Major Lazer featuring Kali Uchis "Wave" Peace is the Mission - Mad Decent/ Because Records (co-wrote, co-producer )

=== Film Soundtrack ===
Song	Year	Album	Co-Artist(s)
"Grandma Calls the Boy Bad News"	2025	F1 the Album	Rachel Keen, Mark Ronson, Christopher Braun, Homer Steinweiss, Nick Movshon
