= Patrick Dougher =

American artist, musician and art therapist

- Born: Brooklyn, New York
- Occupation: Visual Artist

Patrick Dougher is an artist, musician, and art therapist who was born at King's County Hospital and raised in Brooklyn, New York, growing up in the Bushwick neighborhood until the age of 10. He was featured in the Humans of New York series.

== Personal life ==
Dougher was born in New York City to an Irish father and an African American mother. His partner is Sélène Saint-Aimé, a French-Caribbean bassist.

== Music career ==
Dougher began playing the drums at the age of 17 and has performed and recorded as a drummer. He played with the ska band Boilers and Toasters, performed with Sade, recorded with Easy Star All-Stars, and performed at CBGB, the Roxy, Webster Hall, and other venues.

== Education and art therapy career ==
As an art therapist, Dougher worked with children living with HIV and AIDS at King's County Hospital in the early 2000s. As an Educator, he has worked as a youth advisor with the New York City Department of Education and as a teaching artist at Project Reach and Studio in a School; he serves as the Interim Director of Education for BRIC Arts Media.

== Acting career ==
Dougher played a lead role in "Brooklyn 63," a 2014 production by Ping Chong 651 Arts. He has also performed as a poet, using his poetry to criticize the gentrification of Brooklyn neighborhoods.

== Art career ==
Dougher's art career began at the age of sixteen in New York City, during the late 1970s, as a studio assistant in SoHo. He is well known for his "Art Cans," which make use of flattened aluminum cans and draw on traditional African art as well as Xerox art.

As a Program Director for Groundswell, a community mural arts organization in Brooklyn, NY, beginning in 2011, Dougher directed the creation of over 300 murals across New York City, depicting community-focused issues such as gun violence, women, immigration, race, and diversity. He has spoken about the role of art and especially of mural arts as a tool for creating visual legacies within communities that are changing rapidly due to gentrification.

As a mural artist, Dougher designed "Spread Love," the first in a series of murals organized by MoCADA in celebration of its 20th anniversary. "Spread Love" was unveiled in Fort Greene, Brooklyn, in early 2019.

Much of Dougher's work focuses on representing the concept of God in and around people, and seeks to connect African American culture to its sacred African heritage. He is well known for his God Body series of artworks, which depict sacred objects using found and recycled materials.

Dougher also worked as assistant curator at The Museum of African Art.

=== Selected exhibitions ===
- "God Body," MoCADA, November 8 - December 22, 2019
- "Art and Lit," (group exhibition), South Africa, June 2019
- "DWU History Exhibition," ARTs East New York Gallery, January 2019
