= Victor Rice =

- Born: April 17, 1967 (age 59); Syosett, Nassau, New York, United States
- Genres: Reggae, ska, dub
- Occupations: Musician, Producer, Mix Engineer, Sound Designer
- Years active: 1988–present
- Labels: Moon Ska Records, Megalith Records, Stubborn Records

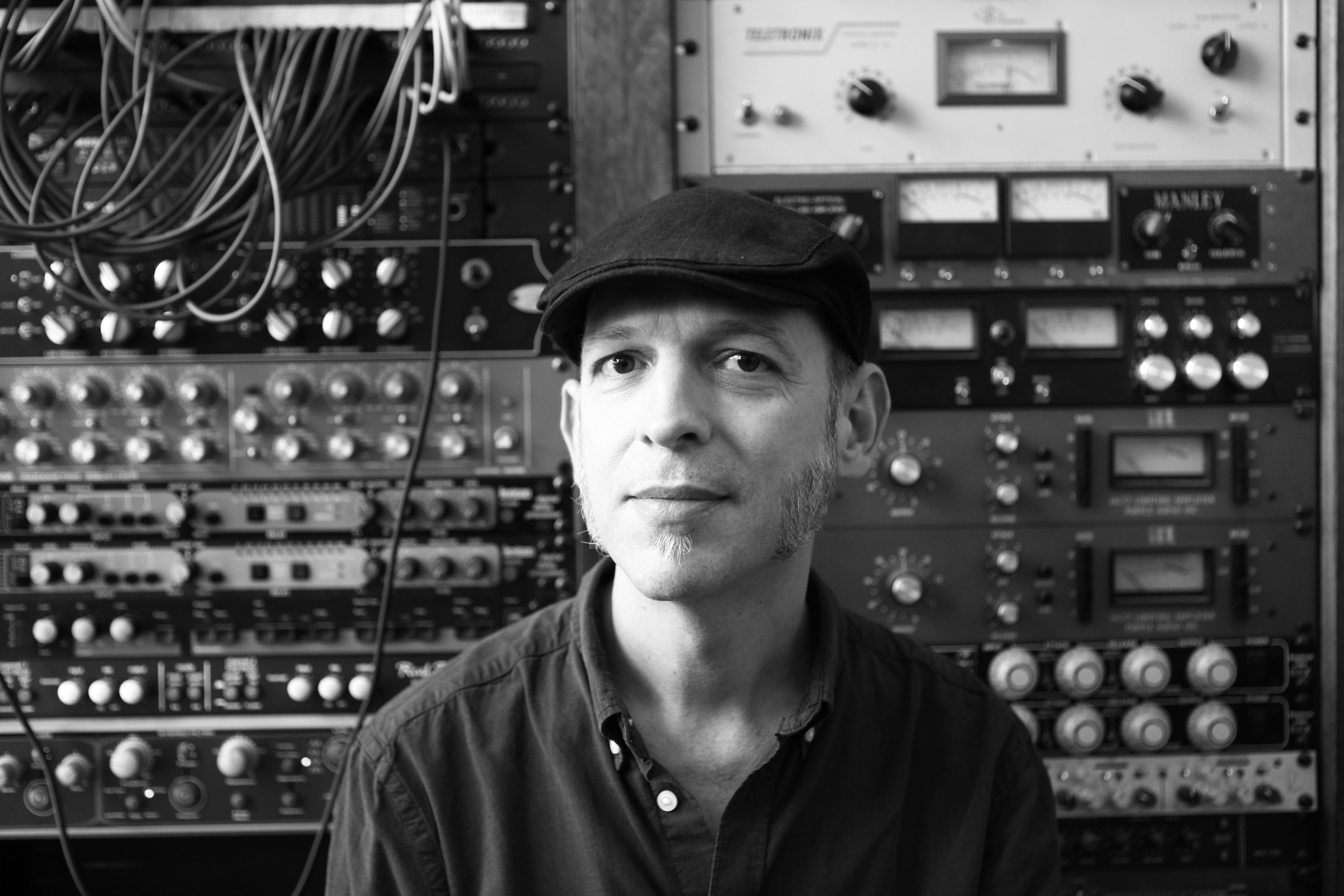
Rice in 2017

Victor Rice (born April 17, 1967) is an American bassist, composer and producer from Long Island, NY. Rice moved to New York City in 1985 to attend Manhattan School of Music, where he received his BM and MM degrees in orchestral performance under Homer Mensch and Linda McKnight, respectively. Rice started his career producing records for the record label Moon Ska Records the following year. In 1996, he moved to Stubborn Records and began engineering his own productions. He moved to São Paulo, Brazil in 2002 and built his own studio, Studio Copan where he is the sole engineer.

Rice has won two Latin Grammys, one in 2015 for his work as mix engineer on Tulipa Ruiz's “Dancê” and one in 2016 for his work as mix engineer on Elza Soares's “A Mulher do Fim do Mundo.” He has released four solo albums of instrumental, retro-reggae and dub music as well as one album under the pseudonym Strikkly Vikkly. He continues to perform with a live band, the Victor Rice Septet, and also as a solo artist under the Strikkly Vikkly pseudonym, using an analog mixing desk and tape machine.

== Composer ==
After graduating from the Manhattan School of Music, Rice decided not to pursue a career as an orchestral musician and instead gravitated toward Jamaican Ska, Rocksteady and Reggae. His instrumental music is based mostly on simple juxtapositions between melody, harmony and bass line, and he is passionate about the realization of what he calls samba-rocksteady. Samba-rocksteady combines beats from Brazilian samba-rock and Jamaican rocksteady, both popular in the mid 1960s. The difference between the rhythms’ swing and their respective dances are subtle, but clear enough that a hybrid may be impossible to resolve. Rice is determined to move in that direction, saying, “The results are already proving to be viably danceable.” He cites Béla Bartok as a major inspirational figure, in both his work in general and also his Mikrocosmos series in particular.

From 2000 to 2008, Rice worked as a post-production engineer and composer-for-hire in the television industry for channels such as HBO, Syfy and the History Channel.

Some of Rice’s earliest compositions can be found on other artists’ records, such as The Scofflaws’ songs "Béla" and "Parish", Version City Rockers’ songs "Damage" and "Disco Envy", and more. He also co-wrote with artists on both Moon Ska Records and Stubborn Records.

== Producer and Engineer ==
Rice was fascinated with recording as a child, and his passion for it only intensified when he became a session bassist at 15. He would hound the studio engineers for information, particularly how to sound better on tape. Rice learned the most from Bob Stander, Cliff Schwarz and Henry Hirsch.

In his first years as a producer for Moon Records, Victor worked with designated engineers and took on the producer’s “old school” role of session coordinator and musical/technical liaison between artist and engineer. It was only when he began producing for Stubborn Records at their Version City studio that Rice assumed the role of engineer out of practical necessity. From that point forward, he was free to develop his own relationship with sound in general and particularly Dub technique.

After moving to São Paulo, Brazil in 2002, Rice built his own studio, Studio Copan where he is the sole engineer.

== Bassist ==
Rice began playing the bass guitar at 13 years old, when he began taking lessons at Munro Music in Huntington, NY. At 17, he began studying orchestral bass with Linda McKnight and bass guitar with Percy Jones. The following year, Rice was accepted to the Manhattan School of Music and began studies with Homer Mensch. After earning his BM in 1989, he again studied with his original teacher, Linda McKnight until earning his MM in 1991.

== Solo Projects ==
=== At Version City - 1998 ===
Created over a span of three years (1996-1998) during Rice’s tenure as a producer for Stubborn Records, At Version City is more of a compilation of individual productions than a conceptual album. Instead, Rice’s use of the same group of musicians as well as the technical simplicity of the analogue studio give the album its cohesive feel.

=== In America - 2003 ===
Friend and fellow producer Victor Axelrod offered his Brooklyn studio to Rice to record his original music. There, Rice recorded a large number of songs that, until that point, had only existed on paper. The recordings began in 2001 and continued until Feb 2002 when Rice moved to Brazil. He brought the recordings as well as another handful of songs written in the interim to Studio El Rocha in São Paulo, Brazil. It is now available on vinyl from Badasonic Records in Europe.

Rice has expressed that the title and artwork are an attempt to convey his transitional period between New York and São Paulo.

In America was released on CD on three continents simultaneously through three different labels, Megalith Records in North America, Radiola Records in South America and Grover Records in Europe. Each tracklist is slightly different, with the Radiola Records version being the definitive. This version had 19 tracks, which included all of the versions of the songs.

=== Strikkly Vikkly - 2014 ===
Strikkly Vikkly is the first full-length LP under that name, released 15 years after the debut of the self-titled single on the Version City Dub Clash compilation. Some of the artists that appear on the album include Ticklah, Cedric Brooks, and Uzimon. The vinyl record sold out and is no longer available.

=== Smoke - 2017 ===
In his time between In America and Strikkly Vikkly, Rice produced and mixed for other artists while also performing extensively in Europe. During that time, Rice began working on Smoke. The finished record was picked up by Easy Star Records in 2016 and released the following year.

=== Drink - 2020 ===
Drink was created in half the time compared with previous albums, which Rice credits to the revival of his career as a composer. The album reaffirmed Rice’s commitment to the Samba-Rocksteady style with more music in that vein, specifically the song “Arouche.” The production of Drink is very similar to that of Smoke, with some changes in personnel: Buford O’Sullivan replaces Mr T Bone on trombone and many Brazilian and American musicians are featured as guests.

== Discography (solo albums) ==
- At Version City
- In America
- Strikkly Vikkly
- Smoke
- Drink

== Select discography (as producer) ==
- The Slackers - Better Late Than Never (Moon Ska Records 1996)
- Skavoovie and the Epitones - Ripe (Moon Ska Records 1997)
- Firebug SP - On The Move (Radiola Records 2006)
- Karina Buhr - Selvática - (YB Music 2015)
- Monkey Jhayam - Monk-Tape (Total Running Time 2019)
- Buena Onda Reggae Club - II (Independent 2020)

== Select discography (as mix engineer) ==
- Laurel Aitken vs The Skatalites - Ska Titans (Moon Records 1998)
- Easy Star Allstars - RadioDread (Easy Star Records 2004)
- Banda do Mar - S/T (Sony Music 2014)
- Tulipa Ruiz - Dancê (Brocal 2015) Won a Latin Grammy in 2015
- Elza Soares - Mulher do Fim do Mundo (CIRCUS 2016) Won a Latin Grammy in 2016

== Select discography (as remix engineer) ==
- Dr Ring Ding and the Senior Allstars - Pick Up the Pieces (Grover 2000)
- Marcia Griffiths - Holding You Close (Echo Beach 2012)
- Bixiga 70 - The Copan Connection (Independent 2017)
- The Loving Paupers - Lines in Dub (Independent 2019)
- Soothsayers Meet Victor Rice in Dub - Flying East (Wah Wah 45 2022)
