= Easy Star All-Stars =

American reggae band

- Origin: Jamaica/United States
- Genres: Reggae, ska, dub
- Years active: 1997–present
- Label: Easy Star
- Members: Michael Goldwasser; Ticklah; Patrick Dougher; Victor Rice
- Website: easystarallstars.net

Easy Star All-Stars is a reggae collective founded in 1997 by Michael Goldwasser, Eric Smith, Lem Oppenheimer and Remy Gerstein of New York City-based Easy Star Records. The band is known for its reinterpretations of classic albums in reggae style. Their first album, released in 2003, was Dub Side of the Moon, an interpretation of Pink Floyd's 1973 album Dark Side of the Moon. This was followed by Radiodread (2006), an interpretation of Radiohead's 1997 album OK Computer; Easy Star's Lonely Hearts Dub Band (2009), an interpretation of the Beatles' 1967 album Sgt. Pepper's Lonely Hearts Club Band; and Easy Star's Thrillah (2012), an interpretation of Michael Jackson's 1982 album Thriller. In 2023, they released their eighth studio album, Ziggy Stardub, a reggae re-imagining of David Bowie's 1972 album The Rise and Fall of Ziggy Stardust.

== History ==
Originally formed as a studio band for Easy Star Records' earliest recordings, Easy Star All-Stars existed mostly as a studio entity until the release of their first album in 2003. Although they have produced several original releases, they are best known for covering popular albums in a reggae and dub style and have released six cover albums to date.

=== 2003–2006: Easy Star All-Stars' early releases ===
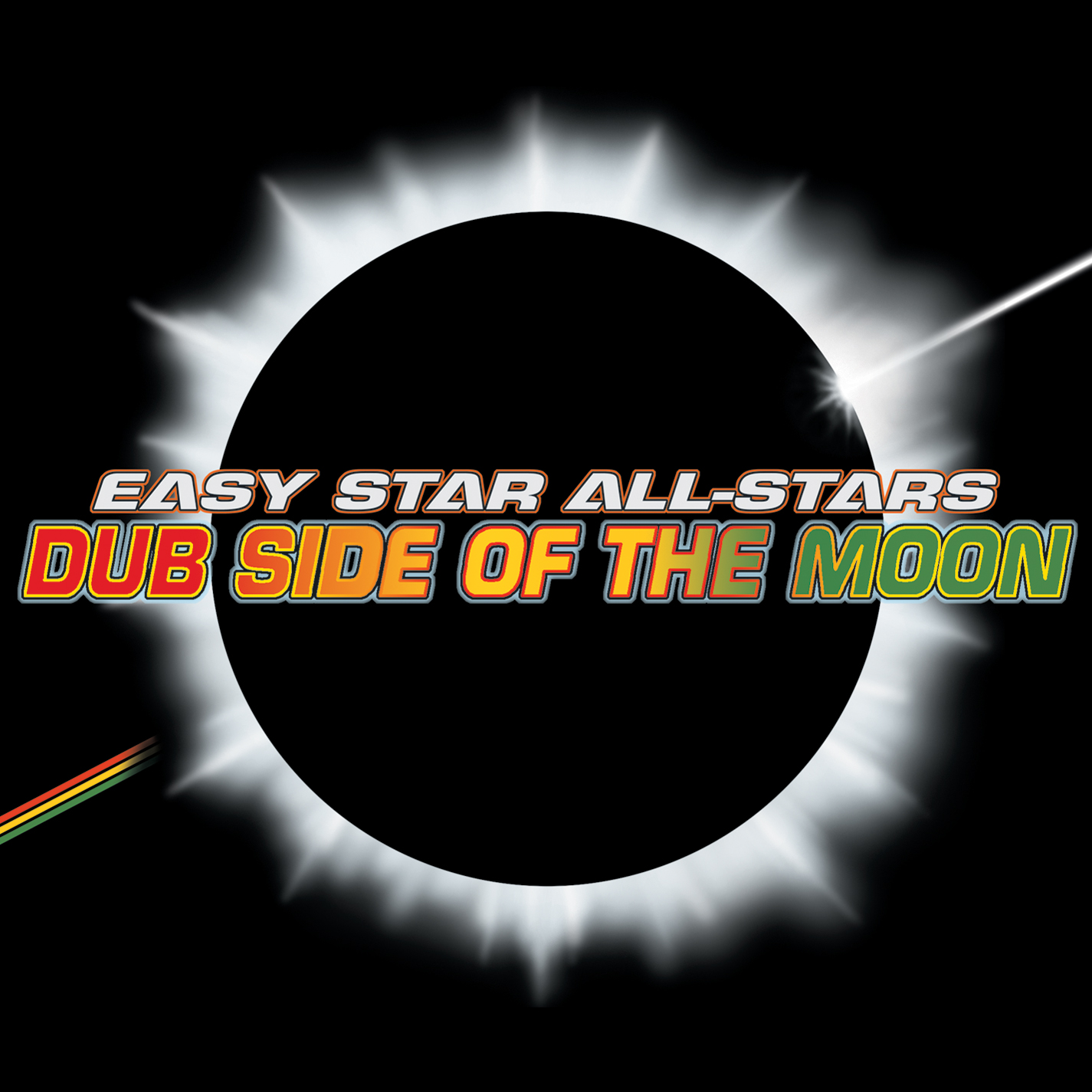
Album cover of Easy Star All-Stars first release Dub Side of the Moon

In February 2003, Easy Star All-Stars released a cover album of Pink Floyd's The Dark Side of the Moon entitled Dub Side of the Moon, a complete reggae reinterpretation of the Pink Floyd album. Dub Side of the Moon has remained on the Billboard Reggae Charts since its release in 2003. It features instructions on how to synchronize the record with The Wizard of Oz, referencing the audiovisual pairing sometimes referred to as Dark Side of the Rainbow.

Dub Side of the Moon was followed by the 2006 release of Radiodread, a reimagining of Radiohead's album OK Computer. At a 2006 Radiohead concert, Thom Yorke praised Toots & The Maytals version of "Let Down" on Radiodread. Radiohead guitarist Jonny Greenwood has also praised the cover version, calling it "truly astounding."

=== 2008–2009 ===
In March 2008, Easy Star All-Stars released Until that Day, an EP consisting of original material except for "Dubbing Up the Walls", a cover of the Radiohead song "Climbing Up the Walls." On 5 April 2011, they released their first original album entitled First Light.

On January 13, 2009 the Easy Star All-Stars posted a statement on their website that they had completed their next album, a reworking of Sgt. Pepper's Lonely Hearts Club Band by the Beatles, titled Easy Star's Lonely Hearts Dub Band, which was released on April 14, 2009. However, it was exclusively released on imeem a day prior. Reviews have been favourable. Sydney street press Music Feeds rated the album 10/10. Easy Star's Lonely Hearts Dub Band cracked the Billboard Top 200 twice, making it the first reggae album to do so in over two years.

Victor Axelrod a.k.a. Ticklah compiled a dub version of a song by the Iowa reggae band Public Property on an upcoming album Work to Do, set for release in July 2009.

Michael Goldwasser compiled a dub version of the song "Turn & Run" by Umphrey's McGee.

=== 2010–2016 ===
In October 2010, the Easy Star All-Stars released Dubber Side of the Moon, featuring bass-heavy remixes of Dub Side of the Moon by Dubmatix, 10 Ft. Ganja Plant, Groove Corporation, Dubphonic, Alchemist, Dreadzone, Kalbata, Adrian Sherwood & Jazzwad, Victor Rice, Border Crossing, Mad Professor, Michael G. & Easy Star All-Stars, and J. Viewz.

On August 28, 2012, the Easy Star All-Stars released Thrillah, a reimagining of Michael Jackson's album Thriller. On September 16, 2014, the Easy Star All-Stars released a special anniversary re-issue of Dub Side of the Moon, their 2003 album reinterpreting Pink Floyd's Dark Side of the Moon. On August 12, 2016, the Easy Star All-Stars rereleased their 2006 album Radiodread; the rerelease contains a bonus track featuring Morgan Heritage covering Radiohead's song "High and Dry" from their 1995 album The Bends.

=== 2017–present: Recent years ===
In recent years, Easy Star All-Stars' producer Michael Goldwasser has worked on a handful of reggae remixes with chart-topping artists, including the tracks "Have It All" by Jason Mraz, "I Like That" by Janelle Monáe, "Heat" by Kelly Clarkson, "Orange Trees" by MARINA, and "90s Kids" by Jax.

On April 21, 2023, the Easy Star All-Stars released Ziggy Stardub, a reggae recasting of David Bowie's The Rise and Fall of Ziggy Stardust and the Spiders from Mars. The album garnered positive reviews, and earned an article with Billboard. On August 23, 2025, they performed at the 30th edition of the Rototom Sunsplash in Benicàssim, Spain.

== Current line-up ==
Listed in the order and as they appear in the liner notes accompanying Dub Side of the Moon:

- Michael Goldwasser (producer/arranger, guitar, bass, keyboards, percussion)
- Victor Axelrod
- Patrick Dougher
- Victor Rice

The core of the touring line-up has remained largely intact since 2003. The rotating roster includes:

- Buford O'Sullivan (trombone, vocals)
- Horace James (keyboards)
- Ivan Katz (Ive-09) (drums, percussion)
- Jenny Hill (saxophone, flute)
- Joanne Williams (vocals, percussion)
- Ras Droppa (bass, vocals, live musical director)
- JonnyGoFigure (guitar, vocals)
- Andrew McIntyre (guitar, vocals)

== Discography ==
- Dub Side of the Moon (2003)
- Radiodread (2006)
- Until that Day EP (2008)
- Easy Star's Lonely Hearts Dub Band (2009)
- Dubber Side of the Moon (2010)
- First Light (2011)
- Easy Star's Thrillah (2012)
- Ziggy Stardub (2023)
