= Heart of Mine =

Heart of Mine may refer to:

- "Heart of Mine" (The Oak Ridge Boys song)
- "Heart of Mine" (Peter Salett song)
  - Heart of Mine, a 2000 album by Peter Salett
- "Heart of Mine" (Bob Dylan song)
- "Heart of Mine", a song by Boz Scaggs from Other Roads
- "Heart of Mine," a song by The Young Veins from Take a Vacation!
