= Fever High =

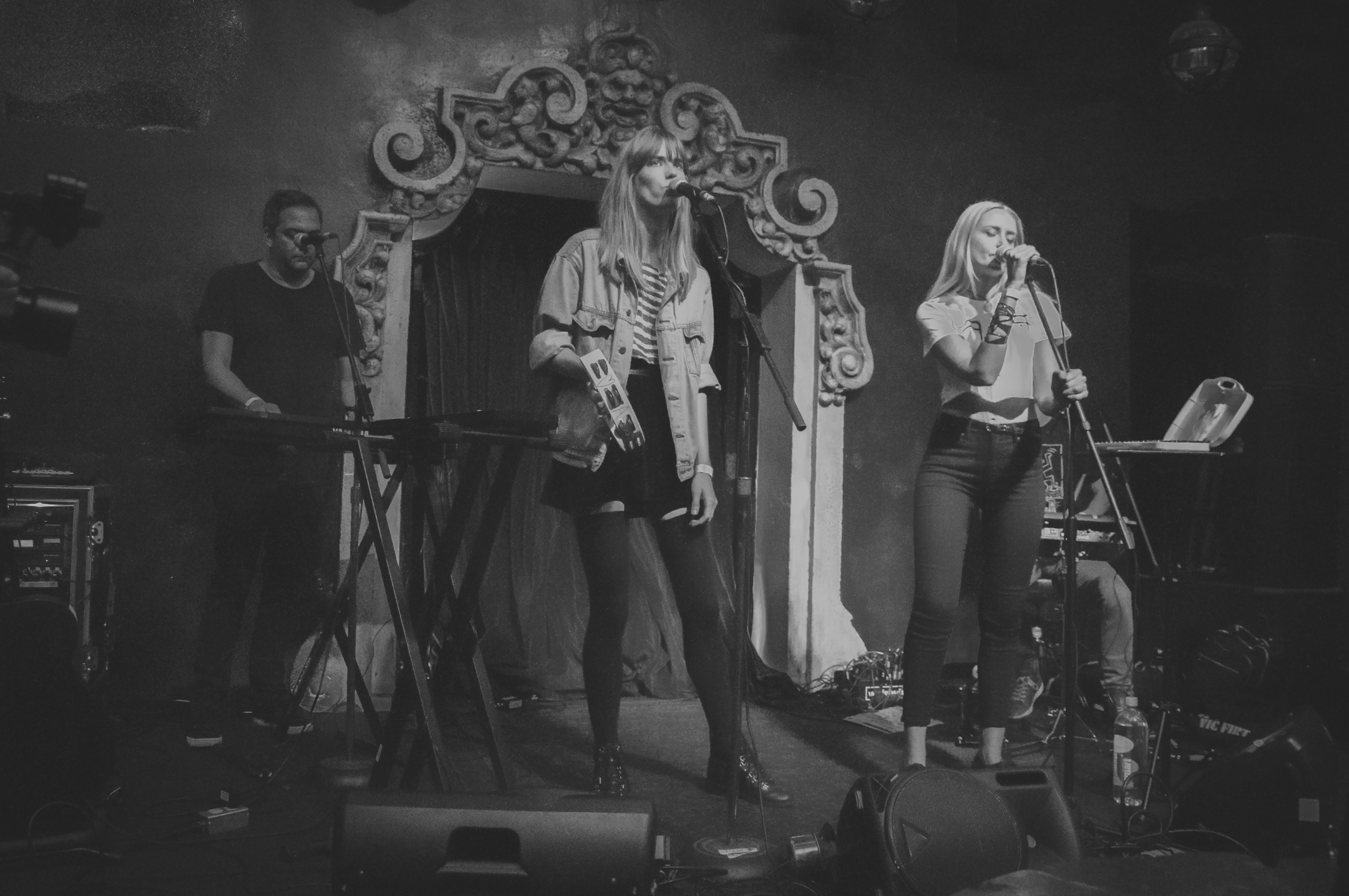
- Adam Schlesinger, Reni Lane and Anna Nordeen (L to R) at Bardot in Hollywood, June 2016

Background information
- Origin: Brooklyn, New York, U.S.
- Genres: Synthpop, pop
- Years active: 2013-present
- Members: Reni Lane; Anna Nordeen
- Past members: Adam Schlesinger; Leah Cary
- Website: feverhigh.com

Fever High is a Brooklyn-based duo composed of singer/instrumentalists Anna Nordeen and Reni Lane. The original formation of Fever High was composed of Nordeen and model/actress Leah Cary. Their five-track debut EP, All Work, was re-released in 2016 by Sire Records after being released independently in 2015. The band also included producer Adam Schlesinger. The group independently released their debut full-length FHNY on November 10, 2017. Pop culture blog The Nerdist called their debut single, "Tantalized", "ideal dance music for the summer." In 2020, former member Adam Schlesinger died of complications related to COVID-19.

The original formation of Fever High included model, actress, and musician Leah Cary. Fever High took shape in the summer of 2013 at the studio of the band’s producer/member, Adam Schlesinger (Fountains of Wayne). “Leah and I would come over to Adam’s studio and sing on demo tracks he would be writing for various things. We would joke about the three of us starting a band,” Nordeen told Bedford + Bowery. “Next thing I know, we’re thinking up band names. Adam wrote a few songs to get us started and now we all collaborate.”

== Members ==
=== Reni Lane ===
Reni Lane plays numerous instruments, including piano, guitar, bass, trumpet and trombone. Lane released a solo album on Universal Motown and has since collaborated and/or toured with The Like, Joseph Arthur, Dave Stewart, Linda Perry and Howie Day.

=== Anna Nordeen ===
Anna Nordeen is a singer, guitarist and songwriter. Nordeen has released a solo EP, "You Know Where I Am", along with acting in various independent films.

== Discography ==
=== Albums/EPs ===
- All Work (Independent) 2015
- All Work EP - re-issue with new track added (Sire Records) June 24, 2016
- FHNY (Independent) November 10, 2017

=== Singles ===
- "Tantalized" (Independent) 2015
- "Tantalized" (Sire Records re-release) June 24, 2016
- "All Work" (Sire Records) September 23, 2016
