= For Life =

For Life may refer to:

== Music ==
- For Life Music, a Japanese record label

=== Albums ===
- For Life (Phases album), 2015
- "For Life" (EP), a 2016 EP by Exo
- For Life (Soul for Real album), 1996

=== Songs ===
- "For Life" (Isis Gee song), 2008
- "For Life" (Exo song), 2016
- "For Life", a song by 3 Years Hollow
- "For Life", a song by Kygo

== Other ==
- Opposition Platform — For Life, a political party in Ukraine, formerly known as For Life
- For Life (TV series), a 2020 American television series

== See also ==
- Life tenure
