= Reni Lane =

American singer-songwriter (born 1988)

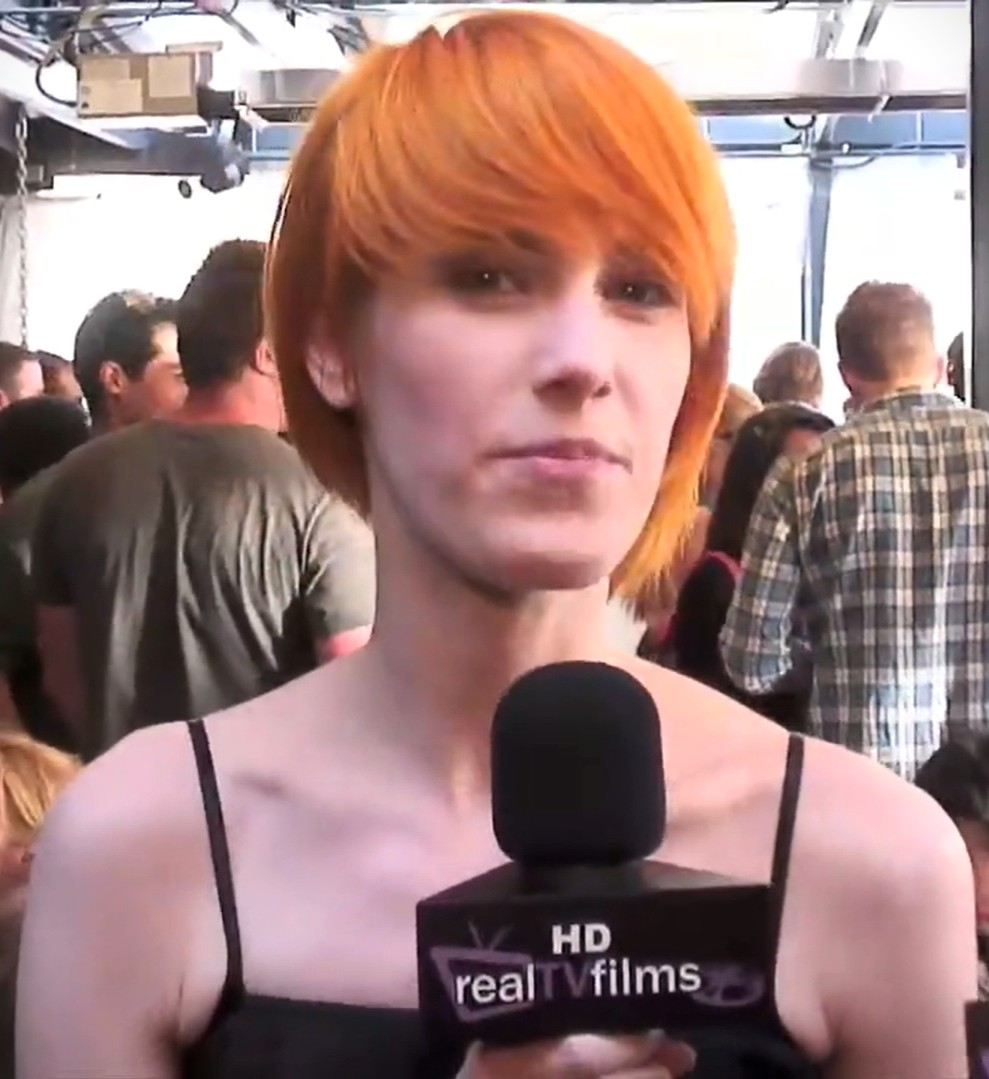
- Lane in 2009

Background information
- Born: Reni Jablonsky; January 10, 1988 (age 38); Corvallis, Oregon, U.S.
- Origin: New York, U.S.
- Genres: Alternative; pop; rock
- Occupations: Singer-songwriter; musician
- Instruments: Vocals; piano; guitar; bass guitar; trombone; trumpet
- Years active: 2006–present
- Labels: Custard; Motown; Sire
- Member of: Razorlight; Fever High
- Formerly of: The Like
- Website: renilane.com

Reni Lane (born Reni Jablonsky; January 10, 1988) is an American alt pop/rock artist and singer-songwriter. Hailing from Oregon, she lives in New York City. Her major label debut, Ready, was released in 2010. She is currently a member of Razorlight, an indie rock group.

Reni has collaborated with artists in multiple genres and contributed to various film scores. Her notable in-studio recordings and live performances have involved The Like, Oracle Sisters, Joseph Arthur, Duncan Sheik, and Howie Day.

== Early life and solo career ==
Reni Lane (previously spelled Reni Laine) was born in Corvallis, Oregon. As a child, Reni was inspired to learn piano by a friend who was studying the Suzuki Method. Her parents bought her a thrift store keyboard so she could experiment on her own and she began recording her compositions.

When she was 11, Reni and her family moved to Williamsburg, Virginia where she participated in various school ensembles and theatre productions. As an 8th grader she won the NAfME (formerly known as MENC) National Electronic Music Talent Search and was flown to Dallas, TX to speak on a panel with music educators from around the world. She was featured as a concert and jazz pianist as well as trombonist in the Lafayette High School “Ram” band before graduating early to move to New York City.

While attending Columbia University Reni began to perform weekly at The Sidewalk Cafe (where she was inspired by performances by Suzanne Vega and Regina Spektor), and worked with songwriters such as Duncan Sheik and Joseph Arthur. In 2007, she finished her first independent album, American Baby, and toured Europe with her band.

MTV featured her in their 'First Ladies of Rock' ad campaign sponsored by Virgin Mobile and this brought her to the attention of songwriter/producer Sam Bisbee. Their work was handed over to super producer Linda Perry who signed her, resulting in her Custard Records/Motown Universal debut, Ready. The album’s single Place for Us was featured in the final season of the television show The L-Word and became the theme song to a VH1 reality series, Secrets of Aspen. To promote the album, Reni attended the 2009 Grammys as a guest of Linda Perry and performed at the NME CMJ showcase and Michele Clark's 2010 Sunset Sessions.

While performing in 2009 at a Paper Magazine event in Los Angeles, Lane was approached by Tennessee Thomas and Z Berg to play keyboards in The Like. She briefly toured with them in the US opening for rock band Arctic Monkeys but her involvement with a project separate from her own put a strain on the relationship with her record label and she was eventually dropped.

== Fever High (2015–2020) and other collaborations ==
When Reni left her label, she gained the freedom to play in new projects and returned to composing for others. Reni contributed to the soundtrack of the 2012 film Diary of a Teenage Girl and performed alongside the film’s composer Nate Heller at the 6th Annual Guild of Music Supervisors awards. She co-wrote two songs on Howie Day’s 2015 album “Lanterns” and toured extensively with his band. In 2018 she contributed to the music of The Sentence, an Emmy award-winning documentary scored by her long time collaborator Sam Bisbee.

In 2015 Lane partnered with Anna Nordeen and the late songwriter/producer Adam Schlesinger to form synth-pop duo Fever High. They released a full-length album and several EPs and were signed to Sire Records. Reni contributed lead vocals, trombone, trumpet, guitar, and keyboards to the group and has remarked that her songwriting was influenced significantly by her time working with Schlesinger. The band disbanded following Schlesinger’s sudden death due to Covid-19.

== Razorlight (2018–present) ==
In November 2018 Reni joined Razorlight as a tour keyboardist for their UK headlining tour, and in 2019 became an official member of the band. She subsequently starred in the music video for their single "Cops and Robbers" and toured Europe and various summer festivals with the band that year.

During the pandemic, Reni performed with the reunited classic lineup in an online streaming show. She is interviewed in the documentary film Razorlight: Fall to Pieces about the band’s reunion which also features clips from their 2021 performance at Isle of Wight festival. She recently performed with Razorlight on Virgin Radio and BBC Radio 2 to promote their best-of album Razorwhat? The Best of Razorlight.

== Return to solo career and other work ==
In more recent times, Reni Lane has returned to her solo career. In 2018, she modelled for Balenciaga and performed a solo piano set at the fashion show of Jill Stuart.

In 2020, Reni announced on her website that she would collaborate with Hey Hey J records to release her new single, Love Too Soon.

In the 2022 music video for Playing in a Band by Delicate Steve, Reni is featured playing bass alongside Meg Duffy, Waxahatchee, Nels Cline (guitarist of Wilco), and Craig Finn among others.

== Discography ==
=== Studio albums ===
- American Baby (2007)
- Ready (2009)

=== Singles ===
- "Place For Us" (2009)
- "Love Too Soon" (2020)

=== Fever High ===
- FHNY (2017)

==== Extended plays ====
- All Work EP (2015)
- Avec You EP (2019)

=== Razorlight ===
- Cops and Robbers (2008)
- Violence Forever (2020)
