= Suicide pact (disambiguation) =

A suicide pact is an agreed plan between two or more individuals to commit suicide.

Suicide Pact also may refer to:

== Titled works ==
- Albums:
  - Suicide Pact – You First (1999), by band Therapy?
  - Suicide Pact (2012), by JJAMZ
- Track title in the album The Mountain Will Fall (2016) of DJ Shadow
- South Korean film A Blood Pledge (2009), AKA Suicide Pact

== Other uses ==
- "Suicide pact", metaphor (in slogan "The Constitution is not a suicide pact") for legal claims construed as willfully at odds with all established theories of U.S. constitutional law
