= Are You Thinking What I'm Thinking? =

Studio album by The Like
- Released: September 13, 2005
- Recorded: 2004–2005
- Genre: Indie rock
- Length: 47:51
- Label: Geffen
- Producer: Wendy Melvoin

The Like chronology
| Like It or Not (2004) | Are You Thinking What I'm Thinking? (2005) | Release Me (2010) |

Singles from Are You Thinking What I'm Thinking?
- 1. "Falling Away" Released: 2001; 2. "What I Say and What I Mean" Released: May 15, 2006; 3. "June Gloom" Released: March 6, 2006

Professional ratings
Aggregate scores
| Source | Rating |
|---|---|
| Metacritic | 77/100 |
Review scores
| Source | Rating |
| AllMusic | 3.5/5 stars |
| NME | 3.5/5 stars |
| Pitchfork | 6.8/10 stars |

Are You Thinking What I'm Thinking? is the debut album by American rock band The Like, released by Geffen in 2005 in the United States and 2006 in selected international markets including the United Kingdom. It features the singles "What I Say and What I Mean" and "June Gloom". In some markets the music video for "What I Say and What I Mean" is included on the album, and in others a cover of Split Enz's "One Step Ahead" (1981) is included as a bonus track.

== Track listing ==
All tracks written by Z Berg, except where noted.

| No. | Title | Length |
|---|---|---|
| 1. | "June Gloom" | 4:09 |
| 2. | "What I Say and What I Mean" | 2:56 |
| 3. | "You Bring Me Down" | 3:34 |
| 4. | "(So I'll Sit Here) Waiting" | 4:07 |
| 5. | "Bridge to Nowhere" | 3:15 |
| 6. | "Once Things Look Up" | 3:52 |
| 7. | "Under the Paving Stones" | 4:23 |
| 8. | "Too Late" | 3:36 |
| 9. | "We Are Lost" | 4:06 |
| 10. | "The One" | 2:57 |
| 11. | "Mrs. Actually" | 3:44 |
| 12. | "Falling Away" | 3:32 |
| 13. | "Waves That Never Break" | 3:38 |
| Total length: | | 47:44 |

Japanese and UK bonus track
| No. | Title | Length |
|---|---|---|
| 13. | "One Step Ahead" (Neil Finn) | 2:56 |
| Total length: | | 50:40 |
