= Release Me (The Like album) =

Studio album by The Like
- Released: June 15, 2010
- Genre: Indie rock, rock and roll
- Length: 37:00
- Label: Geffen
- Producer: Mark Ronson, Thomas Brenneck, Alex Greenwald, Homer Steinweiss

The Like chronology
Are You Thinking What I'm Thinking? (2005)	Release Me (2010)

Professional ratings
Review scores
Source	Rating
Allmusic	4/5 stars
The New York Times	(8/10)
Q Magazine	8/10 stars

Release Me is the second studio album by American rock band The Like, released in 2010 by Geffen Records under license to Downtown Records in the United States and international markets including the United Kingdom. It features the singles "Release Me" and "He's Not a Boy". The songs "Don't Make a Sound" is featured in the closing credits of the 2010 film The Next Three Days and "Walk of Shame" in the 2011 television film Mean Girls 2. Release Me has a 60s girl group inspired sound, described by one critic as "the Shangri-las as if they were backed (by) The Kinks".

== Track listing ==
No.	Title	Writer(s)	Producer(s)	Length
1.	"Wishing He Was Dead"	Z Berg, Alex Greenwald, Thomas Brenneck, Nick Movshon, Homer Steinweiss	Mark Ronson, Alex Greenwald	2:53
2.	"He's Not a Boy"	Z Berg	Mark Ronson, Alex Greenwald	2:35
3.	"Release Me"	Z Berg	Mark Ronson, Alex Greenwald	3:03
4.	"Walk of Shame"	Z Berg	Mark Ronson, Alex Greenwald	2:15
5.	"Narcissus in a Red Dress"	Z Berg, Alex Greenwald	Mark Ronson, Alex Greenwald	3:43
6.	"I Can See it in Your Eyes"	Z Berg	Mark Ronson, Alex Greenwald	2:44
7.	"Fair Game"	Z Berg	Mark Ronson, Alex Greenwald	2:28
8.	"Square One"	Z Berg, Alex Greenwald, James Valentine, Jason Boesel, Michael Runion	Thomas Brenneck, Homer Steinweiss	2:08
9.	"In the End"	Z Berg	Thomas Brenneck, Homer Steinweiss	2:58
10.	"Trouble in Paradise"	Z Berg, Alex Greenwald, Mark Ronson, Thomas Brenneck	Mark Ronson, Alex Greenwald	3:04
11.	"Catch Me If You Can"	Z Berg	Mark Ronson, Alex Greenwald	3:11
12.	"Don't Make a Sound"	Z Berg, Alex Greenwald	Thomas Brenneck, Homer Steinweiss	3:18

"Don't Make a Sound" is followed by a hidden track, "Why When Love is Gone", a song written by Ivy Jo Hunter.

== Personnel ==
- Elizabeth "Z" Berg - guitar, vocals
- Tennessee Thomas - drums, background vocals
- Alex Greenwald - bass, additional production
- Victor Axelrod - organ
- Mark Ronson - production
- Thomas Brenneck - mastering
- Shawn Everett - Engineering, mixing
  - Note: Laena Geronimo and Annie Monroe are credited as bass and organ players respectively, but do not appear on the album.
