= Annie Monroe =

American actress and musician

- Born: Los Angeles, California
- Occupations: Singer; actress; songwriter
- Years active: 2012–present
- Musical career
- Genres: Alternative rock
- Instrument: Organ
- Years active: 2009–2011 (hiatus)
- Labels: Downtown
- Formerly of: The Like

Annie Monroe is an American actress and musician. She is best known for her role as Chloe in the 2015 dark comedy film Bad Roomies, and for playing the organ in the alternative rock group The Like. In Bad Roomies, she stars alongside actors Tommy Savas and Patrick Renna.

== Filmography ==
Film
Year	Film	Role	Notes
2012	Our Name Is Michael Morgan	Penny	
2013	Jake Squared	Actor Jocelyn	
2013	Southland	Brooke Riley S5 E3-6,8-10	
2015	Bad Roomies	Chloe	Lead Role

Television
Year	Title	Role	Notes
2014	Almost Human	Kira	
2017	Law & Order: Special Victims Unit	Quinn Berris	
