= Phases (band) =

American indie pop supergroup

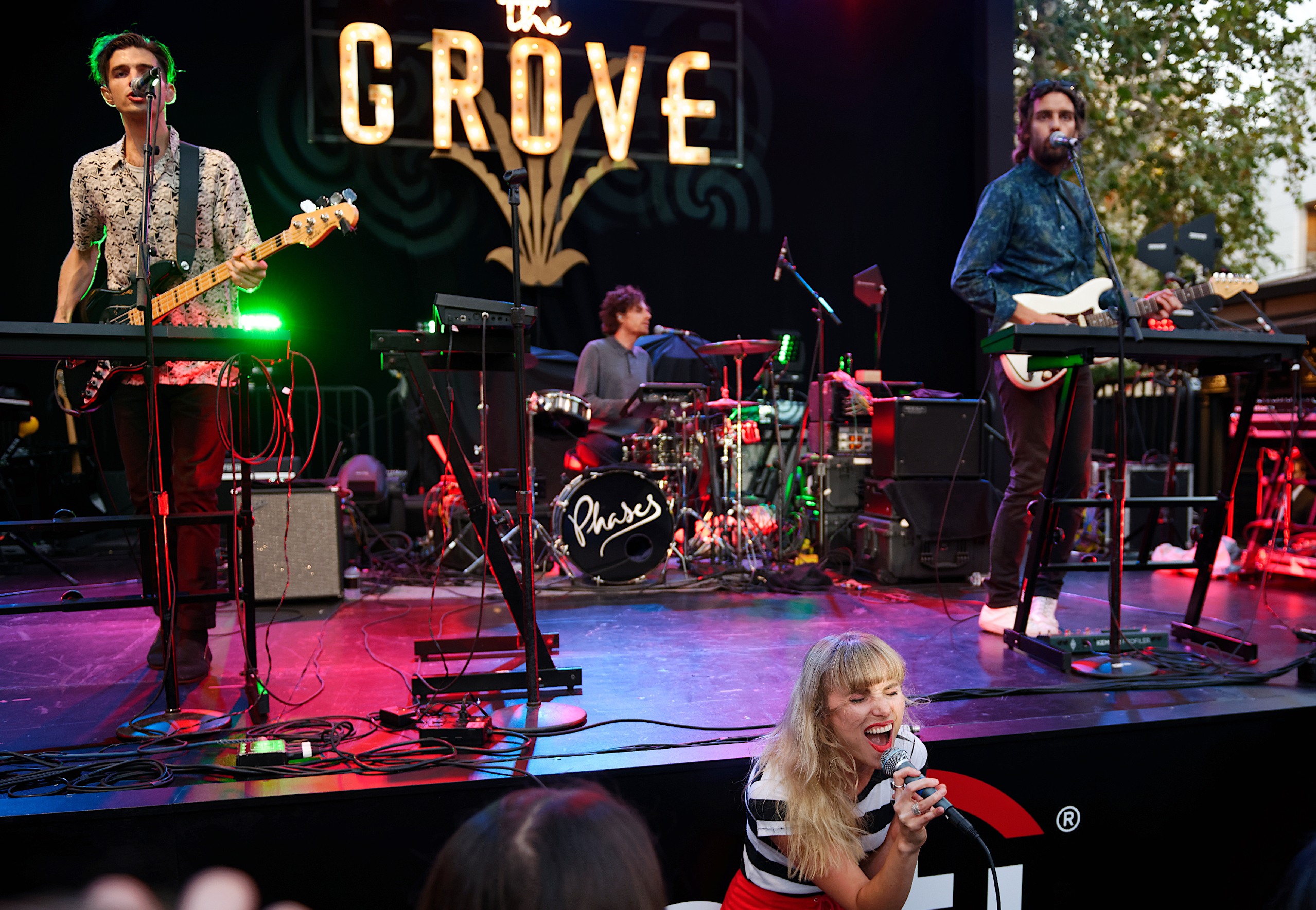
- Phases performing at The Grove at Farmers Market in July 2016

Background information
- Also known as: JJAMZ (2009–2015, 2021)
- Origin: Los Angeles, California, United States
- Genres: Indie pop; indie rock; Synthpop
- Years active: 2009–2016; 2021; (unofficial hiatus)
- Labels: Warner; Dangerbird
- Spinoff of: Phantom Planet; Rilo Kiley; Maroon 5; The Like; Conor Oberst and the Mystic Valley Band
- Past members: Z Berg; Alex Greenwald; Michael Runion; Jason Boesel; James Valentine

Phases (formerly known as JJAMZ and pronounced juh-jamz) was an American indie pop supergroup from Los Angeles, California, formed in 2009 and composed of Jason Boesel (Rilo Kiley/Bright Eyes/Conor Oberst and the Mystic Valley Band), Alex Greenwald (Phantom Planet), Michael Runion, Z Berg (The Like), and until 2015, James Valentine (Maroon 5), after whose departure the band adopted their current moniker, before quietly going on hiatus in late 2016, followed by a one-off reunion in 2021.

== Background ==
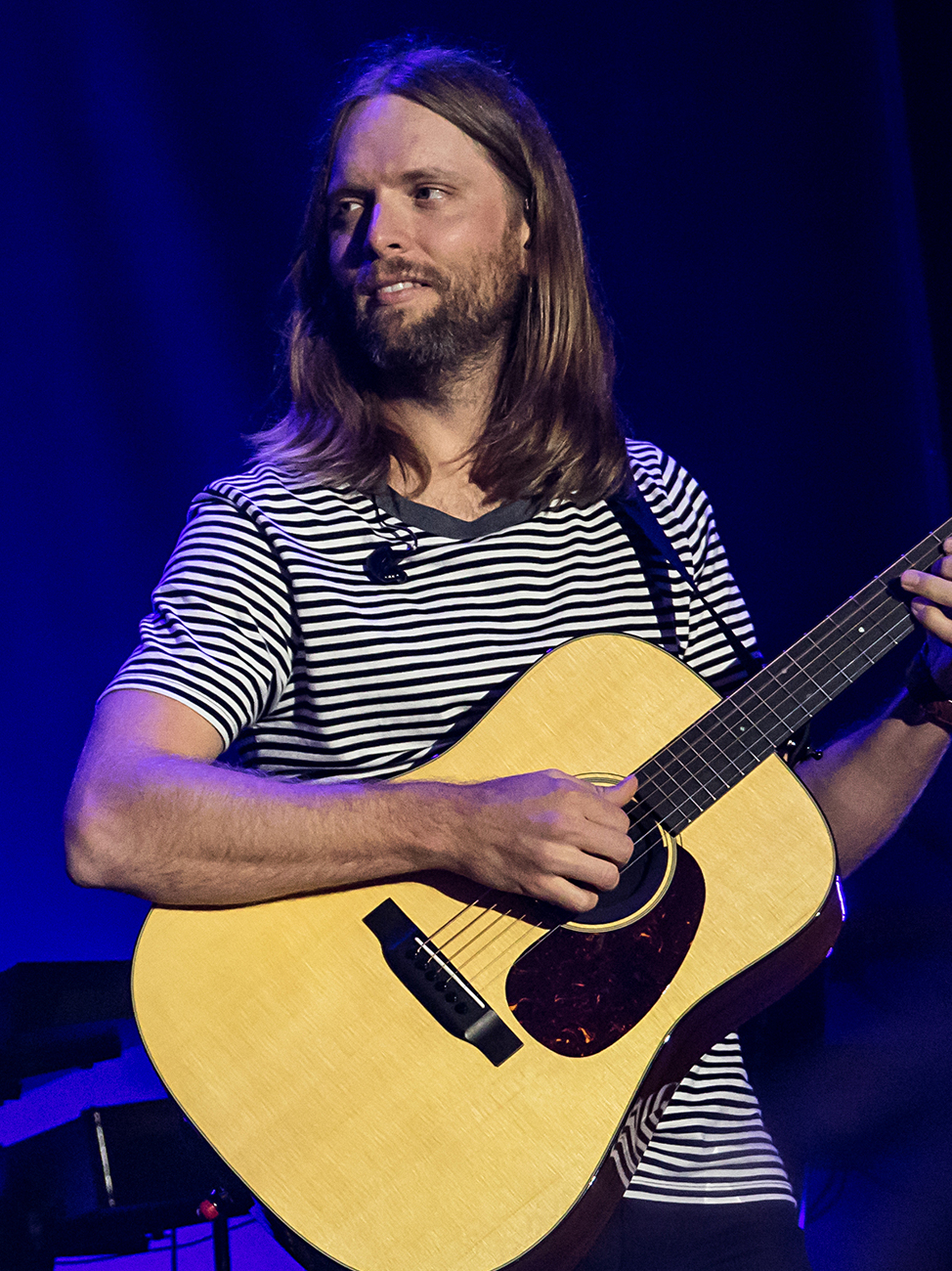
The band, then-known as JJAMZ, featured Maroon 5's James Valentine until 2015, after which the band rebranded to Phases. He later participated in the band's 2021 one-off reunion where they reverted their name to JJAMZ.

Phases in a press photo in March 2015

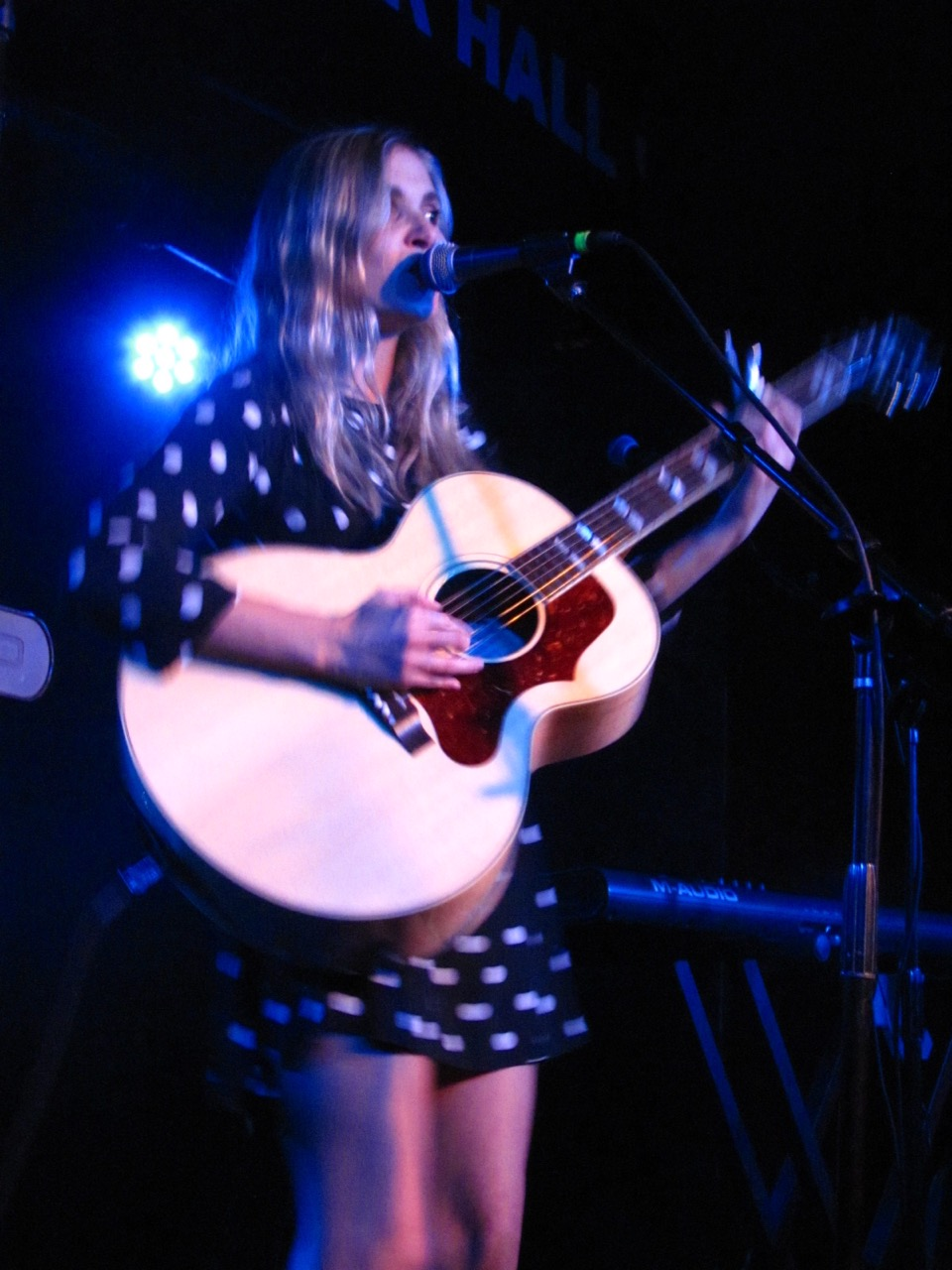
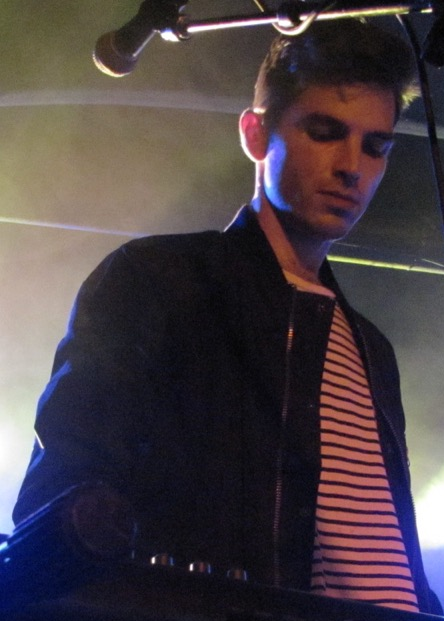
Z Berg (left) and Alex Greenwald (right) performing with Phases at Webster Hall in July 2015

JJAMZ was started at karaoke night at Guys in Hollywood. The band name is an acronym using the first letter of each member's name. The group was a means of escape from each member's respective bands at a time when things seemed hectic for each member. "JJAMZ started at an interesting time in all of our lives. We all needed some kind of escape from relationships or our other bands. It was a tumultuous time, and the lyrics just came out. It was like word vomit. I can't remember," said Z Berg in one of their first interviews as a band.

The band played their first concert at the Echo Plex on January 27, 2009, and went on to release their debut album, Suicide Pact, on July 10, 2012. The album's songs were featured in the television shows: "Get What You Want" in Awkward, "Heartbeat" in Pretty Little Liars and "Cleverly Disgusted" in 90210. To support this release, the band opened for The Hush Sound during a brief tour in October 2012.

Following James Valentine's departure from the band, the name of the band was changed to Phases. In early 2015, the band signed with Warner Records and on May 12, 2015, released their first new music under their new name. "I'm in Love with My Life", "Betty Blue", and "Cooler" were all released on the same day, with a music video directed by Ethan Tobman for "I'm in Love with My Life" released simultaneously. "I'm in Love with My Life" was featured in The Sims 4: Perfect Patio Stuff's official launch trailer as well as the television shows Orange Is the New Black and Faking It.

The band has been on an unofficial hiatus since their last show in late 2016. They reunited for a performance under the JJAMZ lineup for the Z Berg & Friends Christmas Prom on December 4, 2021.

== Band members ==
Former
- Z Berg – lead vocals (2009–2016, 2021), keyboards (2012–2016, 2021)
- Alex Greenwald – guitar (2009–2015, 2021), vocals (2009–2016, 2021), bass and keyboards (2015–2016)
- Michael Runion – bass and occasional vocals (2009–2015, 2021), guitar and backing vocals (2015–2016)
- Jason Boesel – drums and backing vocals (2009–2016, 2021)
- James Valentine – guitar (2009–2015, 2021)

Touring

- Sam Sugarman – guitar (2012)

== Discography ==
Studio albums

- Suicide Pact (as JJAMZ) (2012)
- For Life (2015)

EPs

- Afterparty (2016)

== Singles ==
- "I'm In Love with My Life" (2015) [#35 Alternative Songs, #4 Dance Club Songs]
