= Take a Vacation! =

Studio album by the Young Veins
- Released: June 8, 2010
- Recorded: June–September 2009
- Studios: Castle Oak Studios and Sunset Sound Studios in Los Angeles, California
- Genres: Rock; garage rock; indie rock; pop rock
- Length: 29:06
- Label: One Haven Music
- Producers: Rob Mathes, Alex Greenwald

Singles from Take a Vacation!
- 1. "Change" Released: April 6, 2010; 2. "Take a Vacation!" Released: May 18, 2010; 3. "Everyone But You" Released: May 25, 2010

Deluxe edition cover
- Deluxe edition cover

Professional ratings
Review scores
Source	Rating
Allmusic	3.5/5 stars
BLARE Magazine	3.5/4 stars
Spin	3.5/5 stars
The Sound Alarm	8/10 stars
Review Rinse Repeat	1.5/5 stars
Lush Beat	3.5/5 stars
PopMatters	7/10 stars
Virgin Group	9/10 stars
Indie London	4.5/5 stars

Take a Vacation! is the only studio album by American rock band the Young Veins, and the first musical project by Ryan Ross and Jon Walker after their departure from Panic! at the Disco. It is the only album released during the tenure of members Andy Soukal, Nick Murray, and Nick White, though the album was recorded prior to their recruitment.

Critics have compared the album's sound to the music of 1960s groups such as the Beatles, the Beach Boys, the Kinks, the Hollies, the Searchers, and the Zombies, and have noted its similarities to the earlier Panic! album Pretty. Odd.

Despite the lack of commercial success, Jon Walker has continuously promoted the album through the years, releasing a deluxe edition in 2019, and a remastered edition in 2023.

== Background and production ==
While on tour with Panic! at the Disco in 2008, Ryan Ross and Jon Walker began writing songs intended for the band's third album, but after showing the other members the songs they were working on, it became apparent that a split was occurring over the direction that the band wanted to go in.

On July 6, 2009, Ross and Walker departed from Panic! at the Disco. They soon gathered in Los Angeles and began recording the songs they had originally prepared for the next Panic! album. They were aided by the help of Alex Greenwald of Phantom Planet, who ended up producing seven tracks out of eleven, and Rob Mathes who produced four songs out of the album. He had also produced Pretty. Odd. with Panic! at the Disco.

== Release ==
On July 28, 2009, Ross and Walker announced their new band was entitled The Young Veins and premiered a new song, "Change", on their Myspace profile. On October 20, 2009, "The Other Girl" was made available for streaming.

"Change" was released as a single on April 6, 2010. "Take a Vacation!" was released on May 18 as the next single. "Everyone But You" was released as the third single on May 25. Take a Vacation! was released on June 8 through One Haven Music. Several editions of the album featured a variety of bonus tracks: a cover of the Everly Brothers song "Nothing Matters But You" (iTunes edition), a cover of the Wanda Jackson song "Funnel of Love" (Amazon.com edition), a cover of the Brenda Lee song "Is It True?" (Amie Street edition), and a cover of the Otis Redding song "Security" and a cover of the Searchers song "When You Walk in the Room" (UK edition).

== Track listing ==
All tracks are written by Ryan Ross and Jon Walker except where noted. All songs produced by Alex Greenwald except tracks 1, 2, 3 and 7, produced by Rob Mathes.

Standard edition
No.	Title	Lead vocals	Length
1.	"Change"	Ross	2:31
2.	"Take a Vacation!"	Ross	2:28
3.	"Cape Town"	Ross	2:52
4.	"Maybe I Will, Maybe I Won't"	Walker	2:24
5.	"Young Veins (Die Tonight)" (Ryan Ross, Danny Fujikawa)	Ross	2:19
6.	"Everyone But You"	Walker	3:08
7.	"The Other Girl"	Ross	2:56
8.	"Dangerous Blues"	Ross	2:25
9.	"Defiance"	Ross	2:44
10.	"Lie to the Truth"	Ross	2:29
11.	"Heart of Mine"	Ross and Walker	3:00
Total length:			29:06

Amazon.com bonus track
No.	Title	Lead vocals	Length
12.	"Funnel of Love" (Wanda Jackson cover)	Walker	2:42
Total length:			31:48

Amie Street bonus track
No.	Title	Lead vocals	Length
12.	"Is It True?" (Brenda Lee cover)	Walker	2:47
Total length:			31:53

iTunes bonus track
No.	Title	Lead vocals	Length
12.	"Nothing Matters But You" (featuring Z Berg) (Everly Brothers cover)	Ross and Z Berg	1:54
Total length:			31:00

UK edition bonus tracks
No.	Title	Lead vocal	Length
12.	"Security" (Otis Redding cover)	Ross	2:35
13.	"When You Walk in the Room" (The Searchers cover)	Ross	2:40
Total length:			34:21

Deluxe edition re-issue bonus tracks
No.	Title	Lead vocals	Length
12.	"Is It True?" (Brenda Lee cover)	Walker	2:47
13.	"When You Walk in the Room" (The Searchers cover)	Ross	2:40
14.	"Funnel of Love" (Wanda Jackson cover)	Walker	2:42
15.	"Security" (Otis Redding cover)	Ross	2:35
16.	"Nothing Matters But You" (featuring Z Berg) (Everly Brothers cover)	Ross and Z Berg	1:54
Total length:			41:44

== Personnel ==
Personnel taken from Take a Vacation! CD booklet.

The Young Veins

- Ryan Ross – vocals, guitars
- Jon Walker – vocals, guitars, bass
- Nick Murray – drums (credited but does not perform)
- Andy Soukal – bass (credited but does not perform)
- Nick White – keyboards (credited but does not perform)

Additional musicians

- Alex Greenwald – guitar (tracks 1–3, 5, 7–10), bass (tracks 4, 6 & 10), Wurlitzer (tracks 6 & 10), harmonium, stylophone and gang vocals (track 11)
- Eric Ronick – keyboards (all tracks except 10)
- Than Luu – drums (all tracks except 10)
- Jason Boesel – drums (track 10)
- Z Berg – guest vocals (track 11 and "Nothing Matters But You")
- Michael Runion – gang vocals (track 11)
- Danny Fujikawa – gang vocals (track 11)
- Michael Fujikawa – gang vocals (track 11)

Production

- Rob Mathes – producer (tracks 1–3, 7; at Castle Oak Studios)
- Alex Greenwald – producer (tracks 4–6, 8–11; at Sunset Sound Studios)
- Kevin Harp – engineer and mixing
- Joshua Blanchard – assistant engineer (tracks 1–3, 7; at Castle Oak Studios)
- Morgan Stratton – assistant engineer (tracks 4–6, 8–11; at Sunset Sound Studios)
- Fred Kevorkian – mastering

== Release history ==
Country	Date
United States	June 8, 2010
United Kingdom	July 5, 2010
Worldwide	January 1, 2019 (deluxe edition)
Worldwide	August 28, 2023 (remastered deluxe edition)
