= Suicide Pact =

Studio album by JJAMZ
- Released: July 10, 2012
- Genre: Indie pop
- Length: 39:36
- Label: Dangerbird

JJAMZ chronology
Suicide Pact (2012)	For Life (2015)

Suicide Pact is the debut album by Los Angeles–based indie pop supergroup JJAMZ (later known as Phases), released by Dangerbird Records on July 10, 2012. It was released on CD and vinyl on July 17, 2012. A free download of the single, "Heartbeat" can be obtained on their website. It is the band's only album under the JJAMZ moniker and only to feature James Valentine.

== Track listing ==
All tracks are written by JJAMZ, except where noted.

No.	Title	Length
1.	"Get What You Want"	3:36
2.	"Suicide Pact"	4:30
3.	"Heartbeat"	3:49
4.	"Square One"	4:20
5.	"Never Enough"	3:31
6.	"LAX"	3:29
7.	"Cleverly Disguised"	3:11
8.	"Poolside"	3:59
9.	"You Were My Home"	3:44
10.	"Can I Change My Mind" (Barry Despenza & Carl Wolfork)	5:27
Total length:		39:36

== Chart performance ==
The album's lead single, "Heartbeat", was a big hit in the Philippines, where the song peaked at No. 1 for 3 consecutive weeks at the country's premier RT 30 Countdown, only to be dislodged from the top spot by local act Rico Blanco.

== Personnel ==
=== JJAMZ ===
- Z Berg – vocals
- Jason Boesel – drums, percussion, keyboards
- Alex Greenwald – guitar, bass, keyboards, vocals
- Michael Runion – bass, guitar, vocals
- James Valentine – guitar, synth

=== Additional musicians ===
- Taylor Goldsmith – kazoo
- Blake Mills – guitar
- Sam Sugarman – guitar (during the tour)

=== Technical personnel ===
- Reuben Cohen – mastering
- Pierre de Reeder – engineering
- Shawn Everett – additional production, engineering, mixing
- Alex Greenwald – engineering, programming
- Kevin Harp – engineering
- JJAMZ – production
- Jason Lader – additional production, engineering
- Kenny Woods – engineering
