= Z Berg =

American musician (born 1986)

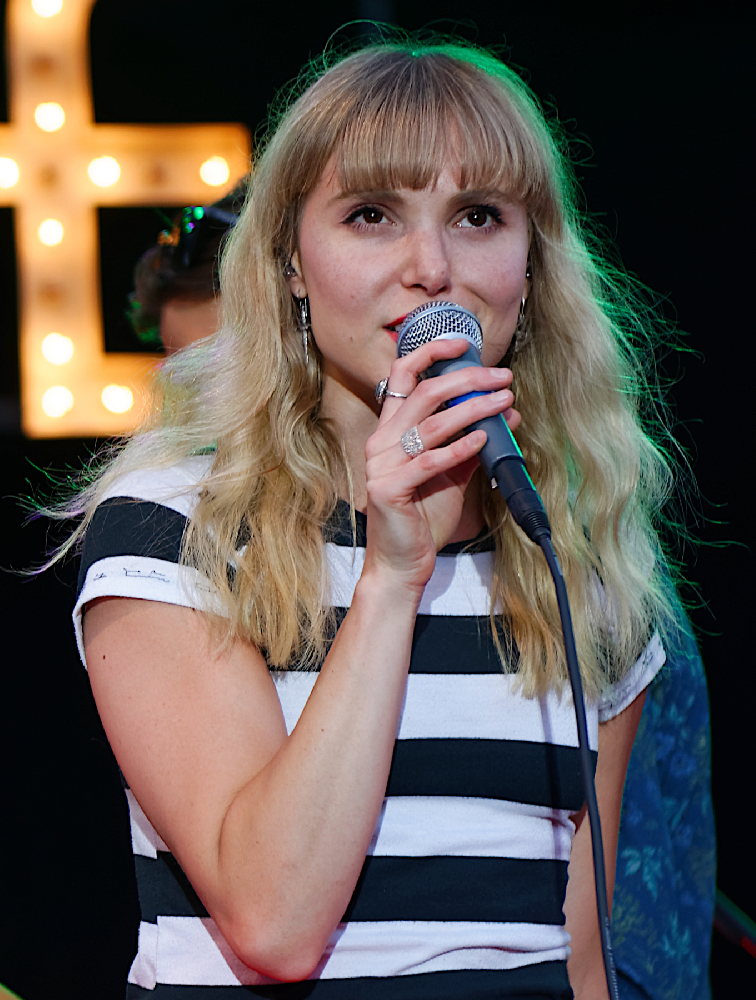
- Berg performing with Phases in July 2016
- Born: Elizabeth Anne Berg; June 28, 1986 (age 40); Los Angeles, California
- Occupations: Singer; songwriter
- Parent: Tony Berg (father)
- Musical career
- Genres: Alternative rock; indie folk; indie rock
- Years active: 2001–present
- Labels: Geffen; Metropolitan Indian; Dangerbird; Warner
- Formerly of: The Like; Phases; Palm Springsteen

Elizabeth Anne "Z" Berg (born June 28, 1986) is an American musician. She was a founding member, guitarist, and lead vocalist of the indie rock group The Like. Berg's father is former Geffen Records A&R exec/record producer Tony Berg. Berg was also a member of Phases and Palm Springsteen, and released a solo album, Get Z to a Nunnery, in 2020.

== Musical career ==
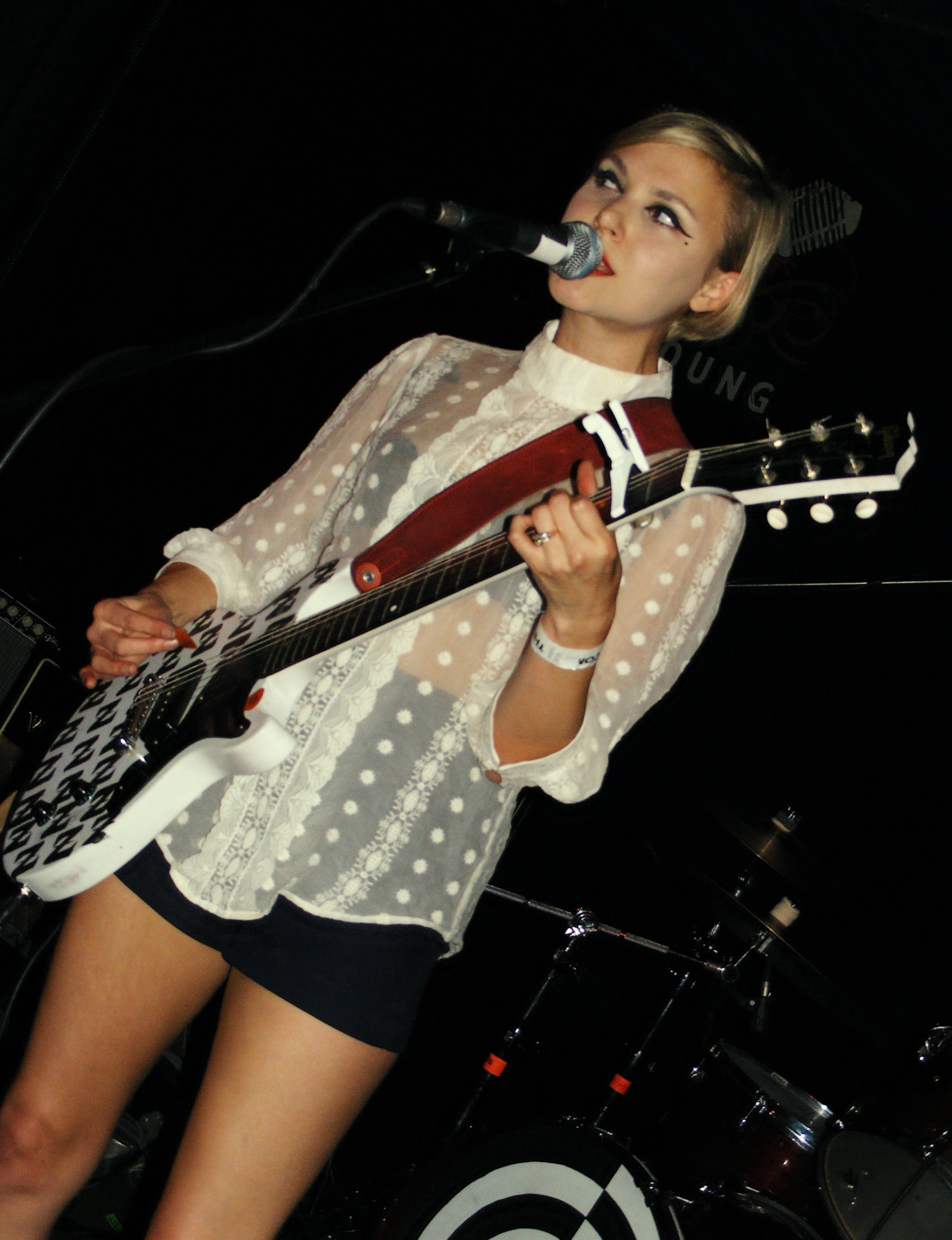
Berg performing with the Like in 2010

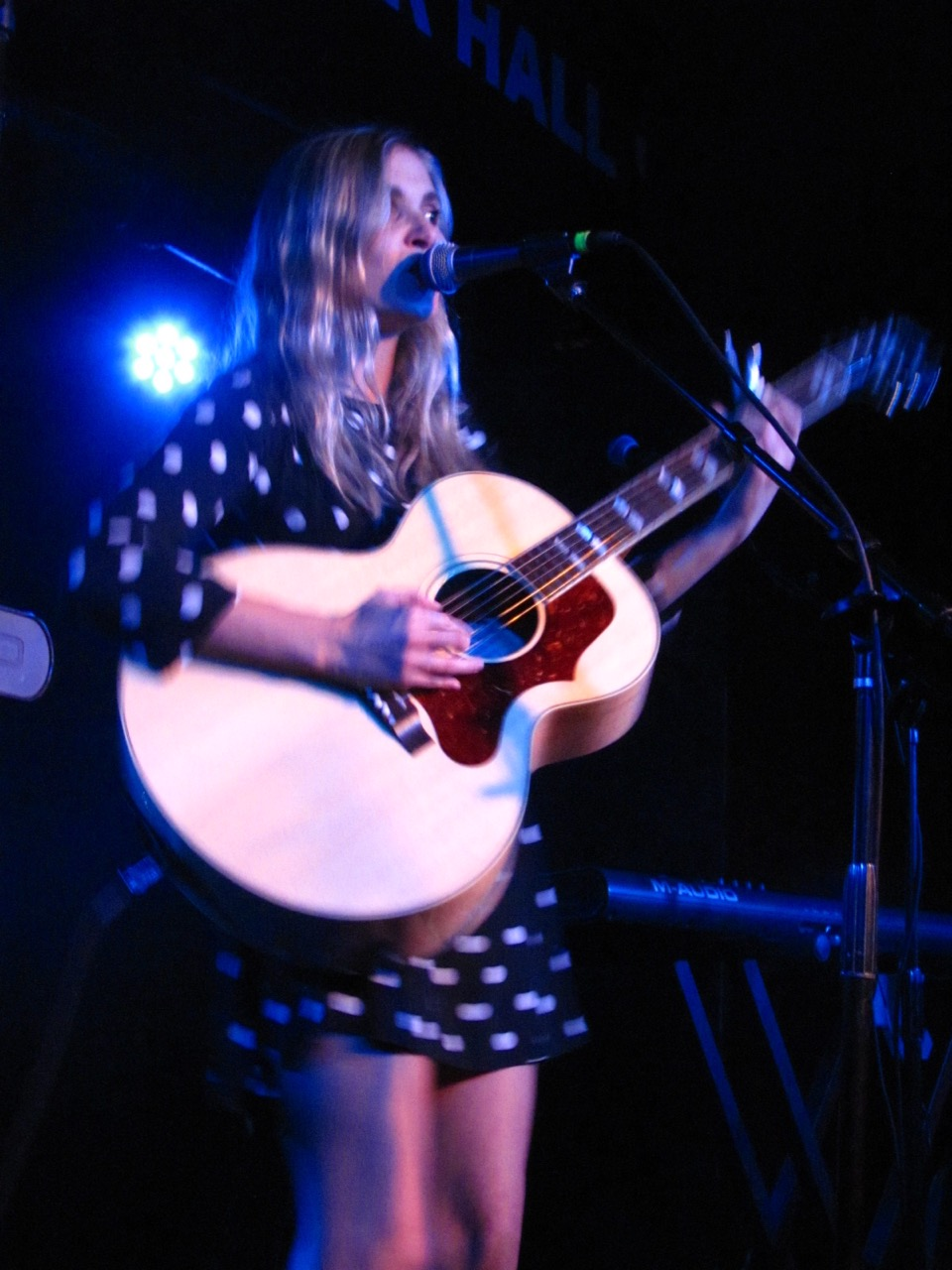
Berg performing in 2015

Berg co-founded The Like along with members Charlotte Froom and Tennessee Thomas at the age of 15. In 2009, Berg formed the supergroup JJAMZ along with James Valentine (Maroon 5), Jason Boesel (Bright Eyes/Rilo Kiley), Alex Greenwald (Phantom Planet), and Michael Runion. Their debut album, Suicide Pact, was released on July 10, 2012, via Dangerbird Records. Following Valentine's departure from the band, it was renamed Phases and a new record, For Life, was released under the new name and lineup on September 18, 2015, before quietly going on hiatus the following year, followed by a one-off reunion in 2021.

Music critic Dan Cairns described her voice as "Björk meets Harriet Wheeler".

In 2018, Z Berg released four songs as a solo artist, "I Fall For the Same Face Every Time" and "I Go to Sleep" (released February 25, 2018) and "Time Flies" (released 11 May 2018). She also directed the music video for "Time Flies." Z Berg released the music video for her song "All out of Tears" on 26 September 2018 and the single was released on music platforms on 2 October 2018.

In December 2018, Berg collaborated with Ryan Ross on the Christmas single "The Bad List", a song detailing their breakup. She also featured on The Young Veins (Ross' band) album Take a Vacation! in 2010 with a cover of the Everly Brothers song "Nothing Matters but You" when the two were a couple.

Since 2017, Berg has done multiple one-off shows titled "Z Berg and Friends" where she performs alongside various musicians and friends. September 30, 2019 marked the first show of The Dead End Kids Club tour, a 7 show tour that expanded on this concept. She toured along with Ryan Ross, Dan Keyes, and Palm Springsteen. Berg was the keyboardist for Palm Springsteen at the time. The tour concluded with a Halloween show in San Francisco on October 28, 2019.

Berg released her debut solo album, Get Z to a Nunnery, in July 2020. In 2024, she released the original motion picture soundtrack to the film Strange Darling.

Berg also co-wrote and contributed backing vocals to multiple tracks from the Daisy Jones & the Six soundtrack. The most notable songs being "Let Me Down Easy," which she sang at her live shows years before its release, and "The River."

== Discography ==
Studio albums

- Get Z to a Nunnery (2020)
- Strange Darling - Original Motion Picture Soundtrack (2024)

EP

- Covers and Love Letters: Screaming into the Void (2021)

Digital singles

- "I Fall For the Same Face Every Time" (2018)
- "I Go to Sleep" (2018)
- "Time Flies" (2018)
- "All Out of Tears" (2018)
- "The Bad List" (featuring Ryan Ross) (2018)
- "We Almost Nailed It" (2019)
- "To Forget You" (2020)
- "Love Hurts" (featuring Keith Carradine) (2024)

With The Like

- Are You Thinking What I'm Thinking? (2005)
- Release Me (2010)

With JJAMZ

- Suicide Pact (2012)

With Phases

- For Life (2015)
- Afterparty (2016)

Guest performances

- "When You're Older" (by Kate Earl, backing vocals, 2005)
- "Snow Through The Pass" (by Mt. Egypt, backing vocals, 2005)
- Cassadaga (by Bright Eyes, backing vocals, 2007)
- "Everybody Pays As They Go" (by Jakob Dylan, backing vocals, 2008)
- "Invisible" (by Bruce Hornsby & The Noisemakers, backing vocals, 2009)
- "Hunting My Dress" (by Jesca Hoop, backing vocals, 2009)
- "Nothing Matters but You" (by The Young Veins, vocals, 2010)
- "My Boo" (by Jesca Hoop, backing vocals, 2010)
- "Women Know" (by Blake Mills, backing vocals, 2010)
- "Dreamcatcher" (by Elizabeth & The Catapult, backing vocals, 2010)
- "Gravity" (by Ashtar Command, vocals, 2012)
- "Tickets" (by Maroon 5, backing vocals, 2012)
- After The Disco (by Broken Bells, backing vocals, 2014)
- The Voyager (by Jenny Lewis, backing vocals, 2014)
- "Let Our Sun Shine Down" (by Joshua Radin, backing vocals, 2015)
- "How Can I Blame You" (by John Legend, backing vocals, 2016)
- "Temporarily Painless" (by John Legend, backing vocals, 2016)
- "Carry Me - Acoustic" (by Family of the Year, vocals, 2016)
- "All Hell Broke Loose" (by Michael Shuman, vocals, 2017)
- "Good Thing" (by Michael Shuman, vocals, 2017)
- Goodbye Sunshine, Hello Nighttime (by Family of the Year, backing vocals, 2018)
- "Hollow Jubilee" (by Johnathan Rice, backing vocals, 2019)
- "Silver Song" (by Johnathan Rice, backing vocals, 2019)
- "Naked in the Lake" (by Johnathan Rice, backing vocals, 2019)
- "Living in the Future" (by Mini Mansions, backing vocals, 2019)
- "Forgot Your Name" (by Mini Mansions, backing vocals, 2019)
- Here, Right Now (by Joshua Radin, backing vocals, 2019)
- "You Can't Put Your Arms Round a Memory" (by Ryan Ross, backing vocals, 2019)
- but i'd rather be with you (by Molly Tuttle, backing vocals, 2020)
- "splinter" (by Switchfoot, backing vocals, 2021)
- "Simple Prayer II" (by Bruce Hornsby, vocals, 2022)
- "Miracle Mile" (by Hollywood Stargirl Cast, vocals, 2022)
- Aurora (by Daisy Jones & the Six, backing vocals, 2023)
- "North Dakota Slate Roof" (by Bruce Hornsby, backing vocals, 2026)
