= The Young Veins =

American rock band

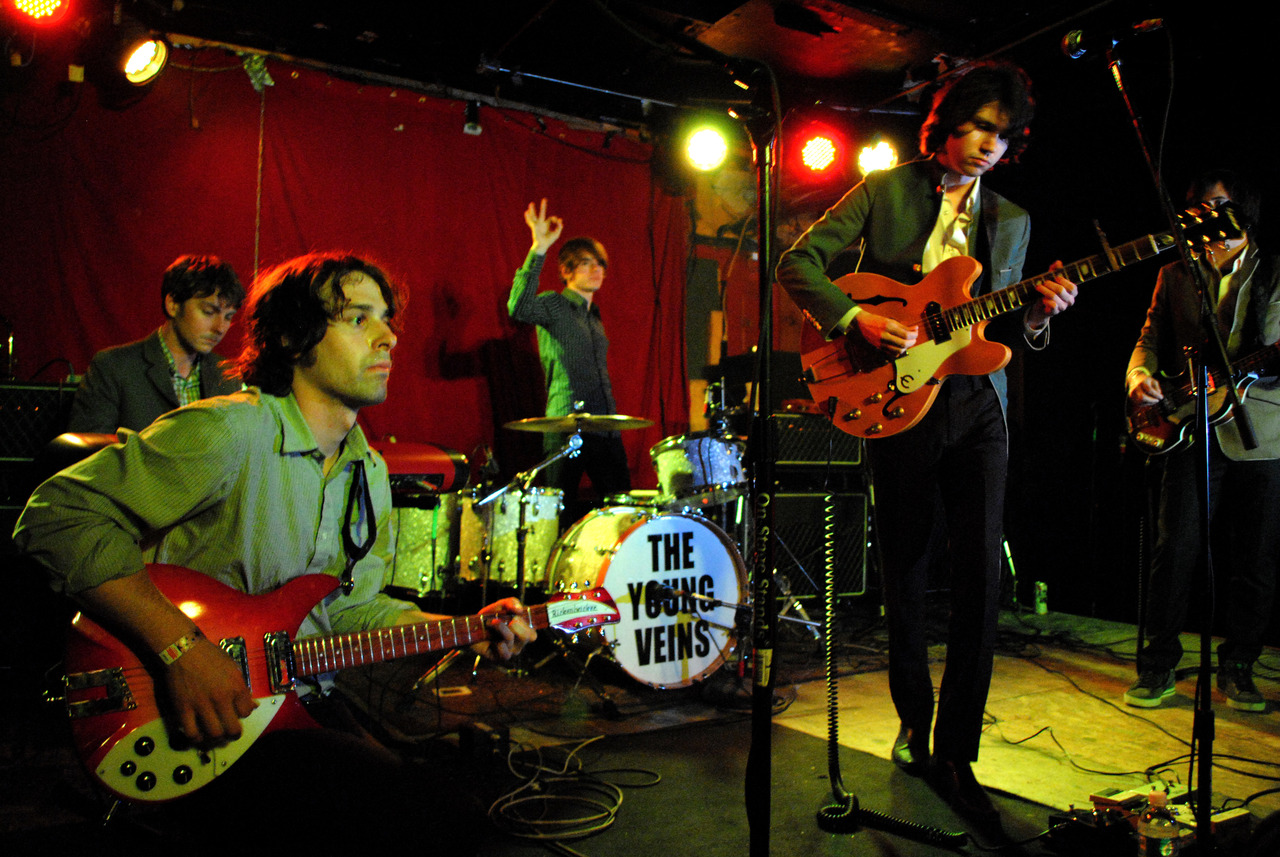
- The Young Veins performing at Jack Rabbits in Jacksonville, FL on March 27, 2010. Left to right: White, Walker, Murray, Ross, Soukal

Background information
- Origin: Topanga, California, U.S.
- Genres: Pop; rock
- Years active: 2009–2010
- Label: One Haven Music
- Spinoff of: Panic! at the Disco
- Past members: Ryan Ross; Jon Walker; Andy Soukal; Nick Murray; Nick White

The Young Veins were an American pop rock band from Topanga, California. The band consisted of Ryan Ross and Jon Walker, two former members of the Las Vegas band Panic! at the Disco, along with bassist Andy Soukal, drummer Nick Murray, and keyboardist Nick White.

== History ==
On July 6, 2009, Ryan Ross and Jon Walker left Panic! at the Disco, citing creative differences as the reason for their departure. On July 28, it was announced via MTV that the duo would re-debut as a retro-leaning rock band called The Young Veins. With their first song "Change" releasing on their Myspace page, the same day as Panic! at the Disco's first single without the members, "New Perspective". MTV credited The Young Veins with "attempting to steal [Panic!'s] thunder", to which Panic! drummer Spencer Smith responded with "No, I wasn't shocked or mad at all. We had about three weeks of people not knowing what was going on with the bands, and it's kind of nice that the music was released at the same time." In October 2009, Ryan announced that the band's first album, Take a Vacation!, had successfully been recorded and were looking for a new label to publish the album, following the expiration of Ryan's contract with Fueled by Ramen. The band eventually signed with One Haven Music, who announced that the album would be officially released on June 8, 2010, with "Change" releasing as the first single on April 5.

The band played their first show on March 15, 2010, at The Echo in Los Angeles, alongside artists such as Alex Greenwald, Z Berg, Jenny Lewis, and Edward Sharpe. In May of that year, it was announced that the band would begin playing their first tour on June 11, debuting members Nick Murray on drums, Andy Soukal on bass and Nick White on keyboards.

On December 10, 2010, guitarist Jon Walker announced via Twitter that the band would go on a hiatus "for the time being".

On September 28, 2023, the band released a remastered version of the deluxe edition of Take a Vacation! along with a vinyl repress.

== Musical style ==
AllMusic biographer Andrew Leahey described the band's sound as being "vintage pop/rock", influenced by the Cookies, the Kinks, and the Cramps. AllMusic reviewer Mark Deming considered Take a Vacation! (2010) as being inspired by "early British Invasion era pop/rock", specifically listing bands such as the Kinks, the Hollies and the Searchers.

== Band members ==
Former

- Ryan Ross – vocals, guitars (2009–2010)
- Jon Walker – vocals, guitars (2009–2010)
- Andy Soukal – bass guitar, backing vocals (2009–2010)
- Nick Murray – drums, percussion (2009–2010)
- Nick White – keyboards (2010)

== Discography ==
=== Studio albums ===
List of studio albums
Title	Album details	Peak chart positions	
Title	Album details	US Indie	US Heat
Take a Vacation!	Released: June 8, 2010; Label: One Haven (OHM-103); Format: CD, DL, LP	40	9

=== Singles ===
List of singles, showing year released and album name
Title	Year	Album
"Change"	2010	Take a Vacation!
"Take a Vacation!"	2010	Take a Vacation!
"Everyone but You"	2010	Take a Vacation!
