= For Life (Phases album) =

Studio album by Phases
- Released: September 18, 2015
- Recorded: Last Resort, Los Angeles and Can Am, Tarzana
- Genre: Indie pop, synthpop
- Length: 45:59
- Label: Warner Bros.
- Producer: Mike Elizondo and Alex Greenwald

Phases chronology
| Suicide Pact (2012) | For Life (2015) | Afterparty (2016) |

Singles from For Life
- 1. "I'm In Love with My Life" Released: July 17, 2015

For Life is the second and to date final studio album by American indie-pop supergroup Phases, the first under their current moniker after its predecessor, Suicide Pact, was released under their original name JJAMZ in 2012.

The single "I'm In Love with My Life" was used in an ad for The Honest Company.

== Background ==
Lead singer Z Berg told Entertainment Weekly, "The time before we started making this music was kind of uncertain, and we had been playing music together as JJAMZ for years and years. As much as I love that record and that music, there was no real concept or direction for it. When it came time to think about how we move forward, we didn’t have the foundational structure to know where to go next." In a separate interview for Nylon she explained, "None of us were in a great place. I wanted to move out of L.A., and I didn't know if we were going to play music together. Then this music really brought us back together and strengthened our friendship and our excitement as a band." Berg told Artistdirect that the band's new sound came about from co-producer Alex Greenwald making recordings in his house: "He sort of sequestered himself in his house ... and learned how to record music. He recorded on Garage Band and an outdated version at that. He just became this electronic recording wizard. That's where we started." When Berg heard Greenwald's experimental recordings, "It sounded like weird, future spaceship music, from a very old spaceship. I thought, 'Alright, whatever happens, let’s at least work on this and make songs for fun, without thinking where they go or who they’re for.'" The group then wrote and jammed in Greenwald's home, silently projecting visually interesting films like Tron and Total Recall on the walls for inspiration.

== Critical reception ==
Professional ratings
Review scores
| Source | Rating |
|---|---|
| Allmusic | 3.5/5 stars |

Neil Z. Yeung of Allmusic wrote, "Even though this is their second release as a band, Phases' debut sounds little like JJAMZ. For Life brings the dingy club rock show into the nightclub, with groove and a smile." Dave Medsker of Popdose referred to "I'm In Love With My Life" as "a catchy song," and said the album was "loaded with songs just as good or better." He said the album's biggest drawback was "that it sounds like they had maybe two keyboards and one drum machine to make the entire album. When one listens to the number of keyboard and drum tracks that Chvrches dropped on their first two albums, Phases would have benefited greatly from diversifying the instrumentation. The tunes are strong, but the sameness in sound undermines them towards the end." Michael Smith at Renowned for Sound gave the album 5 out of 5 stars, writing: "It's not often that you see a band completely reinvent themselves and pull it off as flawlessly as PHASES do ... The intelligent little production choices are what make it such a strong album."

== Track listing ==
All tracks are written by Phases (Alex Greenwald, Z Berg, Michael Runion & Jason Boesel) with additional songwriters noted.

| No. | Title | Writer(s) | Length |
|---|---|---|---|
| 1. | "Silhouette" | Jennifer Decilveo | 3:56 |
| 2. | "Betty Blue" | Mike Elizondo, Paul Shelton | 3:11 |
| 3. | "I'm In Love with My Life" | Elizondo, Shelton | 3:31 |
| 4. | "Spark" | Dan Wilson | 4:01 |
| 5. | "Cooler" | | 4:14 |
| 6. | "Vertigo" | Elizondo, Shelton, Anastasia Whiteacre | 4:07 |
| 7. | "Part of Me" | Decilveo | 3:42 |
| 8. | "Running Away" | | 3:26 |
| 9. | "New Illusion" | Elizondo Sacha Skarbek | 3:35 |
| 10. | "I Don't Know What's Right" | James Valentine | 3:59 |
| 11. | "Lonely Nights" | | 4:03 |
| 12. | "Take Me There" | Elizondo, Shelton | 4:14 |
| Total length: | | | 45:59 |

== Personnel ==
Credits for For Life are taken from the album’s liner notes. (Note: The members of Phases are not credited for their main roles in the liner notes other than lead vocalist Z Berg.)

Phases

- Alex Greenwald – production, programming, engineering, songwriting (all); lead vocals (3); guitar, bass, keyboards
- Z Berg – vocals, songwriting (all); keyboards
- Michael Runion – songwriting (all); guitar, bass
- Jason Boesel – songwriting (all); drums, keyboards

Additional musicians

- Mike Elizondo – production (all); keyboards (1, 2, 5-12); bass (2); synth bass (4, 5, 8)
- Greg Phillinganes – keyboards (1-3)
- Ali Schueler – moaning and laughing (10)
- Camille Giglio – moaning and laughing (10)
- Daniel Vitalis – moaning and laughing (10)
- Frank Giglio – moaning and laughing (10)

Technical personnel

- Adam Hawkins – mixing (1, 5, 6, 8-12); engineering (all)
- Mark “Spike” Stent – mixing (2-4, 7)
- Geoff Swan – engineering (2-4, 7, 9)
- Brent Arrowood – assistant engineer
- Brian “Big Bass” Gardner – mastering
- Jo Ratcliffe – art direction
- Vincent Perini – cover photography
- Julia Brokaw – insert photography
