= Thom Yorke discography =

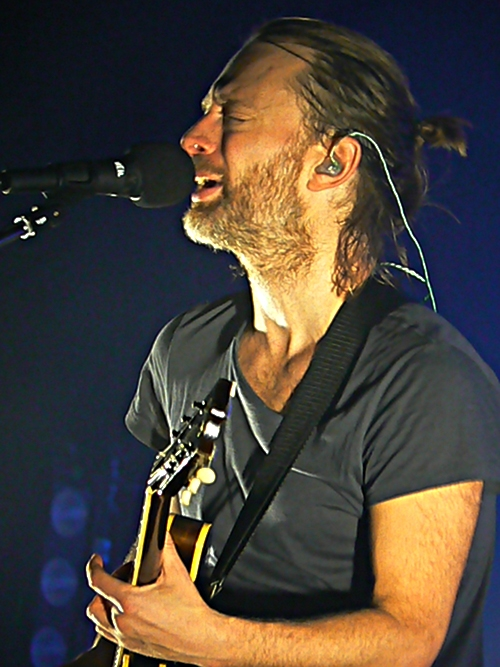
- Yorke performing in 2013
- Studio albums: 3
- Extended plays: 4
- Soundtrack albums: 2
- Singles: 20
- Collaborative albums: 1
- Remix albums: 1

The English musician Thom Yorke has released three studio albums, two soundtrack albums, four EPs, one remix album and 20 singles. The frontman of the alternative rock band Radiohead since 1985, Yorke's first singles as a solo artist were as a featured vocalist on the singles "El President" by Drugstore (which reached the top 20 in the UK) and "Rabbit in Your Headlights" by Unkle.

In 2006, Yorke released his debut solo album, The Eraser, an exploration of electronica. The album was released by XL Recordings, peaking at number three on the UK Albums Chart and number two on the Billboard 200, and included Yorke's highest-charting single, "Harrowdown Hill". A B-sides compilation, Spitting Feathers, was released in 2006, followed by a remix album, The Eraser Rmxs, in 2008.

After releasing the double A-side single "FeelingPulledApartByHorses/TheHollowEarth" and collaborations with the singer Björk and the electronic duo Modeselektor, Yorke self-released his second solo album Tomorrow's Modern Boxes through BitTorrent in 2014, featuring electronic beats and textured synthesisers. Anima, his third solo album, was released in 2019. Yorke composed the soundtracks for the films Suspiria (2018) and Confidenza (2024), and contributed to the soundtracks of The Twilight Saga: New Moon, Motherless Brooklyn, Peaky Blinders, and Smoke. A collaborative album recorded with Mark Pritchard, Tall Tales, was released in May 2025.

== Albums ==
=== Studio albums ===
List of studio albums, with selected chart positions and certifications
| Title | Details | Peak chart positions | | | | | | | | | | Certifications |
| Title | Details | UK | AUS | BEL (FL) | BEL (WA) | CAN | DEN | FRA | ITA | NOR | US | Certifications |
|---|---|---|---|---|---|---|---|---|---|---|---|---|
| The Eraser | Released: 10 July 2006 (UK); Label: XL; Formats: CD, LP, download | 3 | 2 | 3 | 5 | 2 | 6 | 6 | 5 | 10 | 2 | BPI: Gold; MC: Gold |
| Tomorrow's Modern Boxes | Released: 26 September 2014; Label: Self-released; Formats: LP, download, CD | — | — | — | — | — | — | — | — | — | — | |
| Anima | Released: 27 June 2019; Label: XL; Formats: Double LP, download, CD, vinyl book | 5 | 23 | 10 | 21 | 58 | — | 33 | 15 | — | 59 | |

=== Collaborative albums ===
| Title | Details | Peak chart positions | | | |
| Title | Details | UK | AUS | BEL (FL) | BEL (WA) |
|---|---|---|---|---|---|
| Tall Tales (with Mark Pritchard) | Released: 9 May 2025; Label: Warp; Formats: Double LP, CD, vinyl book, CD book, download | 43 | 65 | 42 | 61 |

=== Soundtracks ===
List of soundtrack albums, with selected chart positions and certifications
| Title | Details | Peak chart positions | | | | | | | | | |
| Title | Details | UK | AUS | BEL (FL) | BEL (WA) | FRA | ITA | US | US Alt | US Indie | US OST |
|---|---|---|---|---|---|---|---|---|---|---|---|
| Suspiria | Released: 26 October 2018; Label: XL; Formats: Double LP, download, double CD | 13 | 65 | 23 | 44 | 109 | 20 | 79 | 6 | 2 | 5 |
| Confidenza | Released: 26 April 2024; Label: XL; Formats: LP, download, CD | — | — | — | — | — | — | — | — | — | — |

=== Remix albums ===
List of remix albums, with selected chart positions
| Title | Details | Peak chart positions | |
| Title | Details | US Elec | US Taste |
|---|---|---|---|
| The Eraser Rmxs | Released: 27 August 2008 (UK); Label: Warner Bros.; Formats: CD, LP, download | 13 | 13 |

== EPs ==
List of EPs
| Title | Details | Peak chart positions |
| Title | Details | AUS |
|---|---|---|
| Spitting Feathers | Released: 22 November 2006 (JPN); Label: Warner Bros.; Format: CD | — |
| Suspiria Unreleased Material | Released: 22 February 2019; Label: XL; Format: download | — |
| Not the News Rmx EP | Released: 2 August 2019; Label: XL; Formats: LP, download | — |
| Live from Electric Lady Studios | Released: 26 October 2024; Label: XL; Formats: LP | 46 |

== Singles ==
=== As lead artist ===
List of singles, with selected chart positions, showing year released and album name
| Title | Year | Peak chart positions | | | | | | | | | | Album |
| Title | Year | UK | UK Indie | DEN | EUR | FRA | ITA | JPN Over. | SCO | US Alt. | US Dance | Album |
|---|---|---|---|---|---|---|---|---|---|---|---|---|
| "Black Swan" | 2006 | — | — | — | — | — | — | — | — | 40 | — | The Eraser |
| "Harrowdown Hill" | 2006 | 23 | 3 | 19 | 72 | — | 43 | — | 17 | — | — | The Eraser |
| "Analyse" | 2006 | 136 | 11 | — | — | — | — | — | 87 | — | — | The Eraser |
| "And It Rained All Night" (Burial remix) | 2008 | — | — | — | — | — | — | — | — | — | — | The Eraser Rmxs |
| "Atoms for Peace" (Four Tet remix) | 2008 | — | — | — | — | — | — | — | — | — | — | The Eraser Rmxs |
| "The Clock" (Surgeon remix) | 2008 | — | — | — | — | — | — | — | — | — | — | The Eraser Rmxs |
| "FeelingPulledApartByHorses" / "TheHollowEarth" | 2009 | 113 | 28 | — | — | 73 | — | — | 8 | — | — | Non-album single |
| "All for The Best" | 2009 | — (Note: "All for The Best" did not enter the UK Singles Chart, but peaked at number 21 on the UK Physical Singles Chart.) | — | — | — | — | — | — | 26 | — | — | Ciao My Shining Star: The Songs of Mark Mulcahy |
| "Hearing Damage" | 2009 | — | — | — | — | — | — | — | — | — | — | The Twilight Saga: New Moon (Original Motion Picture Soundtrack) |
| "Ego" / "Mirror" (with Burial and Four Tet) | 2011 | — | — | — | — | — | — | — | — | — | — | Non-album single |
| "Shipwreck" (with Modeselektor) | 2011 | — | — | — | — | — | — | — | — | — | — | Monkeytown |
| "This" (with Modeselektor) | 2012 | — | — | — | — | — | — | — | — | — | — | Monkeytown |
| "YouWouldn'tLikeMeWhenI'mAngry" | 2014 | — | — | — | — | — | — | — | — | — | — | Non-album single |
| "Daily Battles" (with Flea) | 2019 | — (Note: "Daily Battles" did not enter the UK Singles Chart, but peaked at number two on the UK Physical Singles Chart.) | — | — | — | — | — | — | — | — | — | Motherless Brooklyn: Music from the Motion Picture |
| "Her Revolution" (with Burial and Four Tet) | 2020 | — (Note: "Her Revolution" did not enter the UK Singles Chart, but peaked at number 5 on the UK Physical Singles Chart.) | — | — | — | — | — | — | — | — | 37 | Non-album single |
| "His Rope" (with Burial and Four Tet) | 2020 | — | — | — | — | — | — | — | — | — | 26 | Non-album single |
| "Creep (Very 2021 Rmx)" | 2021 | — | — | — | — | — | — | — | — | — | — | Non-album single |
| "5.17" | 2022 | — | — | — | — | — | — | — | — | — | — | Non-album single |
| "That's How Horses Are" | 2022 | — | — | — | — | — | — | — | — | — | — | Non-album single |
| "Knife Edge" / "Prize Giving" | 2024 | — | — | — | — | — | — | 19 | — | — | — | Confidenza |
| "Back in the Game" (with Mark Pritchard) | 2025 | — | — | — | — | — | — | — | — | — | — | Tall Tales |
| "This Conversation is Missing Your Voice" (with Mark Pritchard) | 2025 | — | — | — | — | — | — | — | — | — | — | Tall Tales |
| "Gangsters" (with Mark Pritchard) | 2025 | — | — | — | — | — | — | — | — | — | — | Tall Tales |
| "The Spirit" (with Mark Pritchard) | 2025 | — | — | — | — | — | — | — | — | — | | Tall Tales |
| "Dialing In" | 2025 | — | — | — | — | — | — | — | — | — | — | Smoke (Apple TV+ Original Series Soundtrack) |
"—" denotes a recording that did not chart or was not released in that territory.

=== As featured artist ===
List of singles, with selected chart positions, showing year released and album name
| Title | Year | Peak chart positions | | Album |
| Title | Year | UK | SWE | Album |
|---|---|---|---|---|
| "El President" (Drugstore featuring Thom Yorke) | 1998 | 20 | — | White Magic for Lovers |
| "Rabbit in Your Headlights" (Unkle featuring Thom Yorke) | 1998 | — | — | Psyence Fiction |
| "One Line", "Beautiful Feeling", "This Mess We're In" (PJ Harvey featuring Thom Yorke) | 2000 | - | - | Stories from the City, Stories from the Sea |
| "Do They Know It's Christmas?" (Band Aid 20) | 2004 | 1 | 1 | —N/a |
| "Náttúra" (Björk featuring Thom Yorke) | 2008 | 102 | 39 | —N/a |
| "Beautiful People" (Mark Pritchard featuring Thom Yorke) | 2016 | — | — | Under the Sun |
| "Medicine" (Clark featuring Thom Yorke) | 2023 | — | — | Sus Dog |
| "Traffic Lights" (Flea featuring Thom Yorke) | 2026 | — | — | Honora |

=== Promotional singles ===
List of promotional singles, showing year released and album name
| Title | Year | Album |
|---|---|---|
| "I've Seen It All" (Björk featuring Thom Yorke) | 2000 | Selmasongs: Music from the Motion Picture Soundtrack Dancer in the Dark |

=== Other ===
- "Stepdaughter" by Dajana Roncione; production and percussion by Yorke.

== See also ==
- Radiohead discography
