= The Eraser Rmxs =

Remix album by Thom Yorke
- Released: 27 August 2008
- Genres: Indie electronic; experimental rock
- Length: 53:40
- Labels: XL; WEA WPCB-10063
- Producers: Nigel Godrich, Various Producers/Remixers

Thom Yorke chronology
The Eraser (2006)	The Eraser Rmxs (2008)	Tomorrow's Modern Boxes (2014)

The Eraser Rmxs is a remix album of songs from The Eraser (2006), the debut studio album by the English musician Thom Yorke. It was released on 27 August 2008.

== Release ==
The Eraser Rmxs contains nine remixes of eight tracks from Yorke's 2006 solo album The Eraser by various electronica, dubstep, and techno artists. The remixes were earlier released in the UK by XL Recordings as three EPs, each comprising three tracks. The EPs were first released as downloads in December 2007, then on 12" vinyl records in early 2008.

== Critical reception ==
Professional ratings
Review scores
Source	Rating
AllMusic	4.5/5 stars
Pitchfork	6.7/10
Spectrum Culture	2/5

The Resident Advisor critic Daniel Bates said: "These nine reworks presented a chance to make amends, but most of the remixers seem to have fallen into the same habit Yorke did: playing it safe." He raised the remixes of "Harrowdown Hill" and "Analyse". Jory Spadea of Spectrum Culture viewed the album as superfluous and inferior to The Eraser, but said Four Tet's folktronica remix of "Atoms For Peace" possibly outshone the original with its "Radiohead-like climax". Ryan Domball of Pitchfork praised the hopeful tone and Burial's remix of "And It Rained All Night", saying "Yorke's voice suits Burial's soupy concoctions just as nicely as those mysterious R&B divas he's usually fond of — if this team ever decided to meet on an LP level, few would oppose."

== Track listing ==
=== CD version ===
1. "And It Rained All Night" (Burial Remix) – 4:13
2. "The Clock" (Surgeon Remix) – 6:23
3. "Harrowdown Hill" (The Bug Remix) – 5:16
4. "Skip Divided" (Modeselektor Remix) – 5:35
5. "Atoms for Peace" (Four Tet Remix) – 5:56
6. "Cymbal Rush" (The Field Late Night Essen Und Trinken Remix) – 8:07
7. "Black Swan" (Cristian Vogel Spare Parts Remix) – 6:09
8. "Analyse" (Various Remix) – 4:09
9. "Black Swan" (Vogel Bonus Beat Eraser Remix) – 7:50

=== Vinyl and download version ===
Part 1 (XLT 335):

1. "And It Rained All Night" (Burial Remix) – 4:13
2. "Skip Divided" (Modeselektor Remix) – 5:35
3. "Analyse" (Various Remix) – 4:09

Part 2 (XLT 336):

1. "Atoms for Peace" (Four Tet Remix) – 5:56
2. "Black Swan" (Cristian Vogel Spare Parts Remix) – 6:09
3. "Black Swan" (Vogel Bonus Beat Eraser Remix) – 7:50

Part 3 (XLT 337):

1. "The Clock" (Surgeon Remix) – 6:23
2. "Harrowdown Hill" (The Bug Remix) – 5:16
3. "Cymbal Rush" (The Field Late Night Essen Und Trinken Remix) – 8:07
