= Tomorrow's Modern Boxes =

Studio album by Thom Yorke
- Released: 26 September 2014
- Genres: Indie electronic; experimental rock
- Length: 38:13
- Labels: Self-released; Hostess (Japan); XL (reissue)
- Producer: Nigel Godrich

Thom Yorke chronology
The Eraser Rmxs (2008)	Tomorrow's Modern Boxes (2014)	Suspiria (2018)

Tomorrow's Modern Boxes is the second studio album by the English musician Thom Yorke, released on 26 September 2014. It was produced by Nigel Godrich, with artwork by Stanley Donwood, both of whom have long collaborated with Yorke and his band Radiohead. It blends Yorke's vocals, piano and electronic beats and textures.

Yorke released Tomorrow's Modern Boxes independently via a paid-for BitTorrent bundle. Yorke and Godrich criticised the streaming service Spotify, saying it did not fairly compensate new artists, and expressed their wish to give "control of internet commerce back to people who are creating the work". The album was downloaded over a million times within six days, and became the most downloaded legal torrent of 2014. By February 2015, it had been downloaded more than 4.5 million times.

A vinyl edition was also sold from the official site. In December 2014, Yorke released Tomorrow's Modern Boxes on the online music shop Bandcamp alongside a new song, "Youwouldn'tlikemewhenI'mangry". A CD edition was released in Japan in 2015 by Hostess Entertainment. In 2017, it was added to streaming services including Spotify and retail editions were released worldwide by XL Recordings. Tomorrow's Modern Boxes received generally positive reviews and Rolling Stone named it one of the best albums of 2014. Yorke toured Europe and the US in 2018.

== Background ==
Yorke recorded Tomorrow's Modern Boxes while his first wife, Rachel Owen, was ill with cancer. Yorke described it as a "very bleak period ... It was like a miracle that I could even bring myself to go into the studio at all."

In 2013, Yorke contributed music to The UK Gold, a documentary about tax avoidance, including an early version of "A Brain in a Bottle". Before the album was announced, elements of Tomorrow's Modern Boxes were used in the soundtrack for the second version of the Polyfauna app, released on 1 September 2014. The app, for Android and iOS, is a collaboration between Yorke's band Radiohead and the British digital arts studio Universal Everything.

== Music ==
Tomorrow's Modern Boxes blends Yorke's vocals and piano playing with electronic beats and textures. Critics described it as "eerie" and "neurotic", with "a quiet, restrained sense of dread". The A.V. Club likened its music to the Radiohead tracks "Like Spinning Plates" (2001) and "The Gloaming" (2003).

The opening track, "A Brain in a Bottle", combines Yorke's falsetto with a stuttering beat and "old-school" oscillator effects. The Radiohead bassist, Colin Greenwood, contributed beat programming to "Guess Again!", which features "decaying" piano and "crunchy" backbeats. "Interference" is a minimal "mumbled love song" with "chilly" synth pads. Slant Magazine described "The Mother Lode" as melodic and dubstep-inspired, with an "intoxicating" house beat.

The album's second half features a ten-minute ambient suite, comprising the percussive "There Is No Ice (For My Drink)" and the "hypnotic" "Pink Section". The final track, "Nose Grows Some", approaches synth-pop. In Rolling Stone, Rob Sheffield described it as a "dread-soaked hymn of emotional defeat", likening it to Radiohead finales such as "Motion Picture Soundtrack" from Kid A (2000).

== Artwork ==
Yorke designed the cover art with his longtime collaborator Stanley Donwood. Donwood worked with graphite, creating featureless landscapes devoid of life. Yorke added green graphics he likened to "foreign entities". Donwood said the artwork was among his least popular, which Yorke said was a good sign.

== Release ==
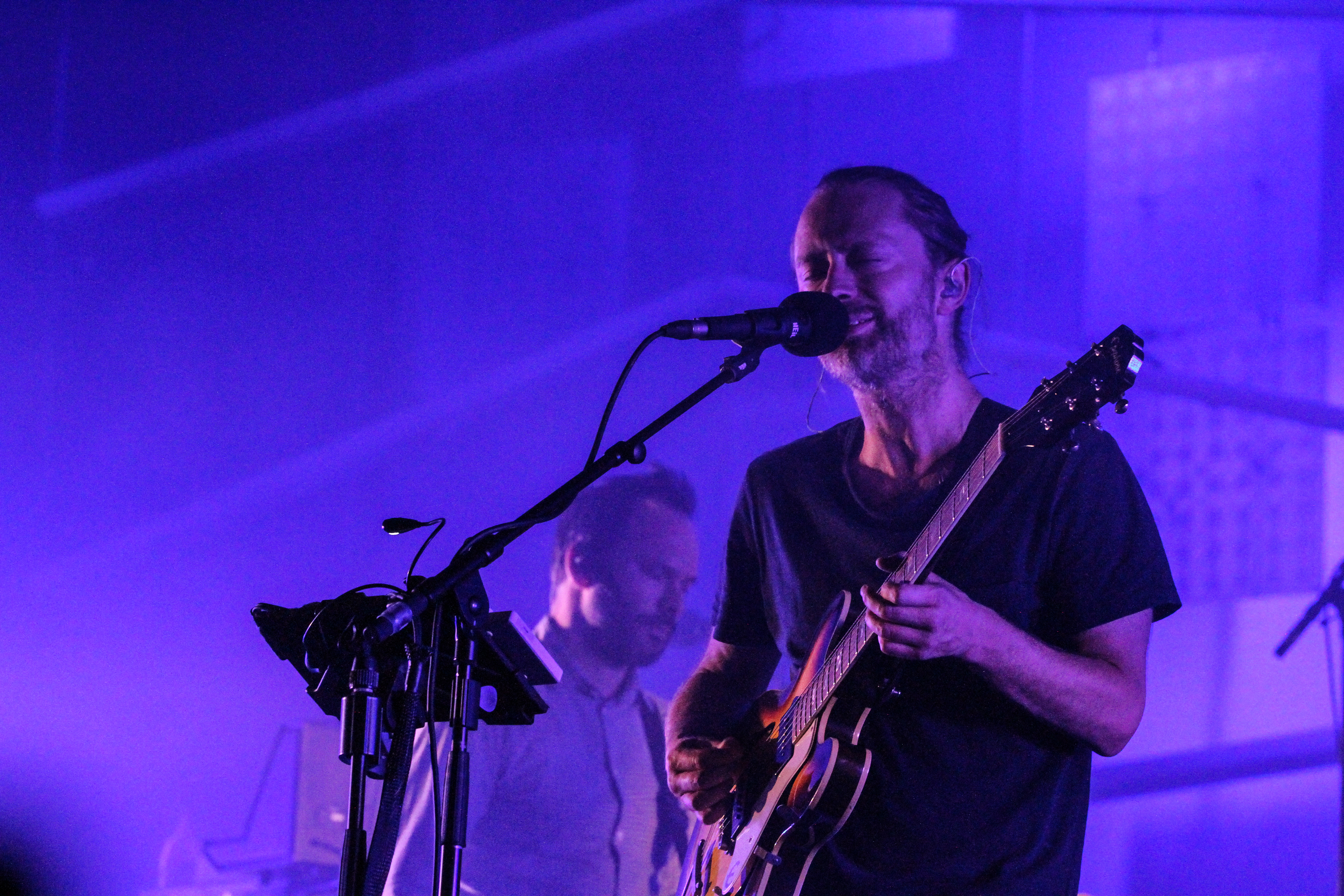
Yorke (front) and Godrich performing with Atoms for Peace in 2013

In 2013, Yorke and his longtime producer, Nigel Godrich, expressed concern about how the internet had affected the music business, and accused the music streaming service Spotify of not compensating new artists fairly. Godrich stated: "[Streaming] cannot work as a way of supporting new artists' work. Spotify and the like either have to address that fact and change the model for new releases or else all new music producers should be bold and vote with their feet."

In 2007, Yorke's band Radiohead self-released their album In Rainbows as a pay-what-you want download. Matt Mason, the chief content officer at BitTorrent Inc, felt the release set a "gold standard for how to do something direct-to-fan on the internet", and began talks with Radiohead's managers about the future of online music distribution. He told The Guardian that Tomorrow's Modern Boxes was "born out of these conversations we had on how the internet should work for artists: the vision we both share, which is that at present we don't have a sustainable business model for artists on the internet". MBA students at Saïd Business School at the University of Oxford worked in secret with Yorke's management for the release, analysing fan and market data.

In September 2014, Yorke posted a photo of an unidentified vinyl record on Tumblr, prompting media speculation. Yorke and Godrich announced Tomorrow's Modern Boxes on 26 September. It was released that day via the peer-to-peer file sharing protocol BitTorrent using BitTorrent Inc's "bundles" initiative, whereby creators distribute their work in packaged torrent files. It was the first album to use BitTorrent's "pay-gate" feature; customers paid US$6 (£3.69) to download the Tomorrow's Modern Boxes torrent bundle containing eight MP3 files, cover artwork by Stanley Donwood, and a music video for "A Brain in a Bottle" featuring Yorke in boxing gloves. Users could also download a free torrent bundle containing only the "Brain in a Bottle" MP3 and video, or order a "deluxe" vinyl edition packaged in a bespoke antistatic bag.

In a press release, Yorke and Godrich wrote:

It's an experiment to see if the mechanics of the system are something that the general public can get its head around … If it works well it could be an effective way of handing some control of internet commerce back to people who are creating the work. Enabling those people who make either music, video or any other kind of digital content to sell it themselves. Bypassing the self elected gate-keepers. If it works anyone can do this exactly as we have done.

=== Other formats ===
On 26 December 2014, Yorke released Tomorrow's Modern Boxes in MP3 and FLAC formats for £3.86 on the online music shop Bandcamp. He also released a free additional song, "Youwouldn'tlikemewhenI'mangry". The Guardian described it as "typically maudlin ambient electronica and indecipherable lyrics".

On 30 June 2015, Tomorrow's Modern Boxes was made available to stream with the launch of Apple Music. A CD version was released in Japan by Hostess Entertainment in August 2015. On 8 December 2017, it was reissued on CD and vinyl by XL Recordings and added to further streaming services, including Spotify, along with Yorke's other solo work.

=== Sales ===
Tomorrow's Modern Boxes was downloaded over 100,000 times in its first 24 hours and over a million times in its first six days. Excluding internet piracy, it was the most torrented album of 2014. By February 2015, it had been downloaded more than 4.5 million times. These figures include downloads of the free torrent bundle containing only the "Brain in a Bottle" MP3 and music video; separate figures for the album bundle were not released.

Stereogum and Gigaom estimated that Yorke may have made $20 million USD from the release, more than he would likely have made through a traditional release. Stereogum wrote that "this sort of album-release strategy only works for artists who are already astronomically famous, but salute Thom Yorke for figuring out ways to keep stacking cash while keeping his artistic autonomy". However, Billboard argued that, assuming the ratio of people who paid for the full album was comparable to subscription numbers of Spotify and Pandora, earnings between $1 and 6 million were more likely: "Not bad showing for a self-released, direct-to-fan album that allowed Yorke to circumvent major download stores and gather customer information — but it's no Hollywood starring role, either."

In November 2015, asked if the BitTorrent release had been a success, Yorke said: "No, not exactly. But I wanted it to be an experiment ... I wanted to show that, in theory, today one could follow the entire chain of record production, from start to finish, on his own. But in practice it is very different. We cannot be burdened with all of the responsibilities of the record label. But I'm glad I did it, for having tried to."

== Tour ==
At Latitude Festival in July 2015, Yorke played a surprise set, playing songs from Tomorrow's Modern Boxes and his first solo album, The Eraser (2006). In August, he performed at Summer Sonic Festival in Tokyo. In December 2017, he performed at the Fonda Theatre in Los Angeles, the Fox Theater in Oakland, California, and the Day for Night festival in Houston, Texas. In 2018, he toured Europe in May and June, supported by Oliver Coates, followed by the US in November and December. He was accompanied by Godrich and the audiovisual artist Tarik Barri.

== Reception ==
Professional ratings
Aggregate scores
Source	Rating
AnyDecentMusic?	6.8/10
Metacritic	72/100
Review scores
Source	Rating
AllMusic	3.5/5 stars
The A.V. Club	B−
The Daily Telegraph	4/5 stars
Entertainment Weekly	B+
The Guardian	3/5 stars
Mojo	3/5 stars
NME	7/10
Pitchfork	6.3/10
Rolling Stone	4/5 stars
Uncut	8/10

At Metacritic, which assigns a weighted mean rating out of 100 to reviews from mainstream critics, Tomorrow's Modern Boxes has an average score of 72 based on 29 reviews, indicating "generally favourable reviews".

The AllMusic critic Stephen Thomas Erlewine described Tomorrow's Modern Boxes as "deliberately underwhelming, an old-fashioned grower that doesn't startle upon first listen but rather slowly unfolds ... Instead of wallowing in alienation, Yorke has found comfort within it on Tomorrow's Modern Boxes and the difference is palpable." Rob Sheffield of Rolling Stone wrote that it "demands deep listening" and praised "Nose Grows Some" as the strongest track. Rolling Stone named the album the 30th-best of 2014. The Slant Magazine critic Franklin Jones wrote: "This is paranoia with a soul, and occasionally a heart ... Tomorrow's Modern Boxes maintains the trademark elements of a Thom Yorke release while injecting subtle moments of fresh invention." Barry Nicholson of NME wrote: "It's hardly love at first listen … Yet across repeat plays, the album's charms begin to unfurl."

The A.V. Club gave the album a positive review, but wrote: "Flashes of brilliance aside, the result sounds an awful lot like something Yorke dashed off to pass the time before delving into the new Radiohead album." Mark Beaumont of the Guardian called it "deviously understated", but found it less impactful than its unconventional release. Larry Fitzmaurice of Pitchfork wrote: "There's precious little to grab on to in terms of melody and feeling, and you won't find yourself humming along to anything here. That said, certain elements of Tomorrow's Modern Boxes, if given the right amount of attention, can be enjoyable to luxuriate in." Chris Barton of the Los Angeles Times found it too similar to Yorke's 2006 album The Eraser and his work with Atoms for Peace, writing that Yorke was "short on new directions".

== Track listing ==
All tracks are written by Thom Yorke and Nigel Godrich, except "Guess Again!" by Yorke, Godrich and Colin Greenwood.

No.	Title	Length
1.	"A Brain in a Bottle"	4:41
2.	"Guess Again!"	4:24
3.	"Interference"	2:49
4.	"The Mother Lode"	6:07
5.	"Truth Ray"	5:14
6.	"There Is No Ice (For My Drink)"	7:00
7.	"Pink Section"	2:35
8.	"Nose Grows Some"	5:23
Total length:		38:13

== Personnel ==
Adapted from the Tomorrow's Modern Boxes packaging.

- Thom Yorke – music, vocals; artwork advice (credited as Tchocky)
- Nigel Godrich – production, editing
- Colin Greenwood – beat programming on "Guess Again!"
- Bob Ludwig – mastering
- Stanley Donwood – artwork ("holes dug & filled in")

== Charts ==
Chart (2015)	Peak position
US Billboard Dance/Electronic Albums	13
