= Pathway to Paris =

Environmental organization founded in 2014

Pathway to Paris is a nonprofit organization founded in 2014 by musicians and activists Jesse Paris Smith and Rebecca Foon.

== 1000 Cities ==
A key initiative of Pathway to Paris is the 1000 Cities Initiative for Carbon Freedom. This initiative encourages cities worldwide to transition to 100% renewable energy and achieve zero carbon emissions by 2040 or sooner. The premise is that if 1000 cities adopt ambitious climate action plans that target shifting off of fossil fuels, it will significantly contribute to meeting the Paris Agreement's targets and beyond.

Pathway to Paris collaborates with various partners, including the United Nations Development Programme (UNDP), 350.org, Sustainability Solutions Group (SSG), and the Little Sun Foundation.

The "1000 Cities" project, officially known as the 1000 Cities Initiative for Carbon Freedom, aims to get 1000 cities to pledge to transition to 100% renewable energy by 2040. Launched at the United Nations Secretariat in 2017, the initiative promotes the development of ambitious climate action plans and financial mechanisms to implement these plans, fostering a renewable energy future.

== Founders ==
Jesse Paris Smith and Rebecca Foon are the founders of Pathway to Paris. Inspired by their passion for conservation, climate change, and social justice, they established the organization following the momentum of the People’s Climate March in New York City in 2014. The initial event on September 22, 2014 involved Thurston Moore, Patti Smith, and Lenny Kaye, as well as Michael Stipe from R.E.M., and combined music and discourse to build awareness about the urgency of establishing a global climate agreement. During the United Nations Climate Change Conference in December 2015, Smith, Foon, Flea, Thom Yorke, Patti Smith, and Warren Ellis participated in the Pathway to Paris concerts held at Le Trianon in Paris. The event also featured speakers including Bill McKibben, Naomi Klein, and Vandana Shiva, contributing to a lineup of performers and speakers addressing climate change. A live album, Pathway to Paris, was released in July 2016.
