= Oxford Printmakers Co-operative =

Oxford Printmakers Co-operative is an open access fine art printmaking workshop in Oxford, England, located in the Christadelphian Hall at the end of Tyndale Road off the Cowley Road near The Plain. It was set up in 1976 to help and enable artists in the Oxford area to provide them with a platform and a place where they could make their own artwork and prints.

== Overview ==
It offers facilities for intaglio, stone litho, silkscreen and relief printmaking. It is a non-profit making organisation that regularly holds exhibitions and welcomes people from the local community to join in. It has a community outreach programme and runs courses each year in several printmaking processes.

The workshop is open Saturdays 11-5, Monday evenings 4-8, and Tuesdays 10.30-6.30 with technical help and support.

== Associated artists ==
- Rachel Owen

== See also ==
- Community art
