= Confidenza (soundtrack) =

Soundtrack album by Thom Yorke
- Released: 26 April 2024
- Studio: RAK (London)
- Length: 36:09
- Label: XL
- Producer: Sam Petts-Davies

Thom Yorke chronology
Anima (2019)	Confidenza (2024)	Tall Tales (2025)

Singles from Confidenza
- 1. "Knife Edge / Prize Giving" Released: 22 April 2024

Confidenza (English: Trust) is the soundtrack for the 2024 Italian drama film Confidenza, composed by the English musician Thom Yorke and produced by Sam Petts-Davies. It is Yorke's second feature film score. It was released on 26 April 2024 through XL Recordings.

== Background and recording ==
The Confidenza director, Daniele Luchetti, first worked with Yorke on a documentary about Carla Fracci, Codice Carla, which used music by Yorke's band Atoms for Peace. Yorke agreed to compose for Confidenza after the script "evoked some musical threads".

Luchetti described their process as finding "a way in sideways; building the music more through the subtext than through the narrative itself". He and Yorke were "constantly searching for something that sounded a bit off". Luchetti said they wanted to create tension while making the characters' fears appear "ridiculous".

The score features the London Contemporary Orchestra and a jazz ensemble including the drummer Tom Skinner, of Yorke's band the Smile, and the saxophonist Robert Stillman, who has performed with the Smile. It was produced by Sam Petts-Davies, who produced Yorke's 2018 soundtrack Suspiria and the 2024 Smile albums Wall of Eyes and Cutouts.

== Promotion and release ==
Yorke's involvement was announced in January 2024, ahead of the Confidenza premiere at the International Film Festival Rotterdam. Yorke's music was used in the main trailer. In February, Yorke played the track "The Big City" during one of the Smile's Artist in Residence shows for BBC Radio 6 Music.

The soundtrack was announced on 22 April 2024, alongside the singles "Knife Edge" and "Prize Giving". Videos were released for "Knife Edge" and "Four Ways in Time", featuring footage from Confidenza arranged by the film's editor, Ael Dallier Vega. The soundtrack was released on streaming services on 26 April to coincide with the film's Italian release, with a retail release on 12 July.

== Reception ==
Professional ratings
Review scores
Source	Rating
Colin's Review	B+
Spectrum Culture	3.5/5 stars
Spin	A−

Ryan Reed of Spin wrote that the soundtrack "finds its own compelling arc as a front-to-back album" and "feels like a blink-and-you'll-miss-it flag-plant moment". Alex Hudson of Exclaim! chose it as a "staff pick", writing that it was "low-stakes" but "compelling music worth listening to", and would be welcome for fans of Yorke's band Radiohead. In BrooklynVegan, Andrew Sacher said the soundtrack worked independently of the film and that the instrumentals were among the standouts.

== Track listing ==
All tracks are written by Thom Yorke.

Confidenza track listing
No.	Title	Length
1.	"The Big City"	7:49
2.	"Knife Edge"	3:19
3.	"Letting Down Gently"	1:18
4.	"Secret Clarinet"	1:23
5.	"In the Trees"	1:20
6.	"Prize Giving"	3:12
7.	"Four Ways in Time"	4:56
8.	"Confidenza"	3:47
9.	"Nosebleed Nuptials"	3:36
10.	"Bunch of Flowers"	2:11
11.	"A Silent Scream"	0:38
12.	"On the Ledge"	2:30
Total length:		36:09

== Personnel ==
- Thom Yorke – composition and lyrics, vocals, performance, front cover art
- Sam Petts-Davies – production, mixing, engineering
- Hugh Brunt – orchestration, conducting
- Matt Colton – mastering
- Francesca Edwards – assistant engineering (RAK London)
- Stanley Donwood – design
- London Contemporary Orchestra – string performance
- Jazz Ensemble
  - Robert Stillman (band leader) – tenor saxophone, bass clarinet, clarinet
  - Chelsea Carmichael – flute, alto flute, tenor saxophone
  - Tom Challenger – baritone saxophone, clarinet, tenor saxophone
  - Pete Wareham – baritone saxophone, flute
  - Byron Wallen – trumpet, flugelhorn
  - Nathaniel Cross – trombone, bass trombone
  - Rosie Turnton – trombone
  - Tom Herbert – double bass
  - Neil Charles – double bass
  - Tom Skinner – drums, percussion

== Charts ==
Chart performance for Confidenza
Chart (2024)	Peak position
Australian Digital Albums (ARIA)	29
Belgian Albums (Ultratop Flanders)	118
Japanese Hot Albums (Billboard Japan)	73
Scottish Albums (OCC)	22
UK Rock & Metal Albums (OCC)	5
UK Soundtrack Albums (OCC)	1
