= Thom Yorke =

English musician (born 1968)

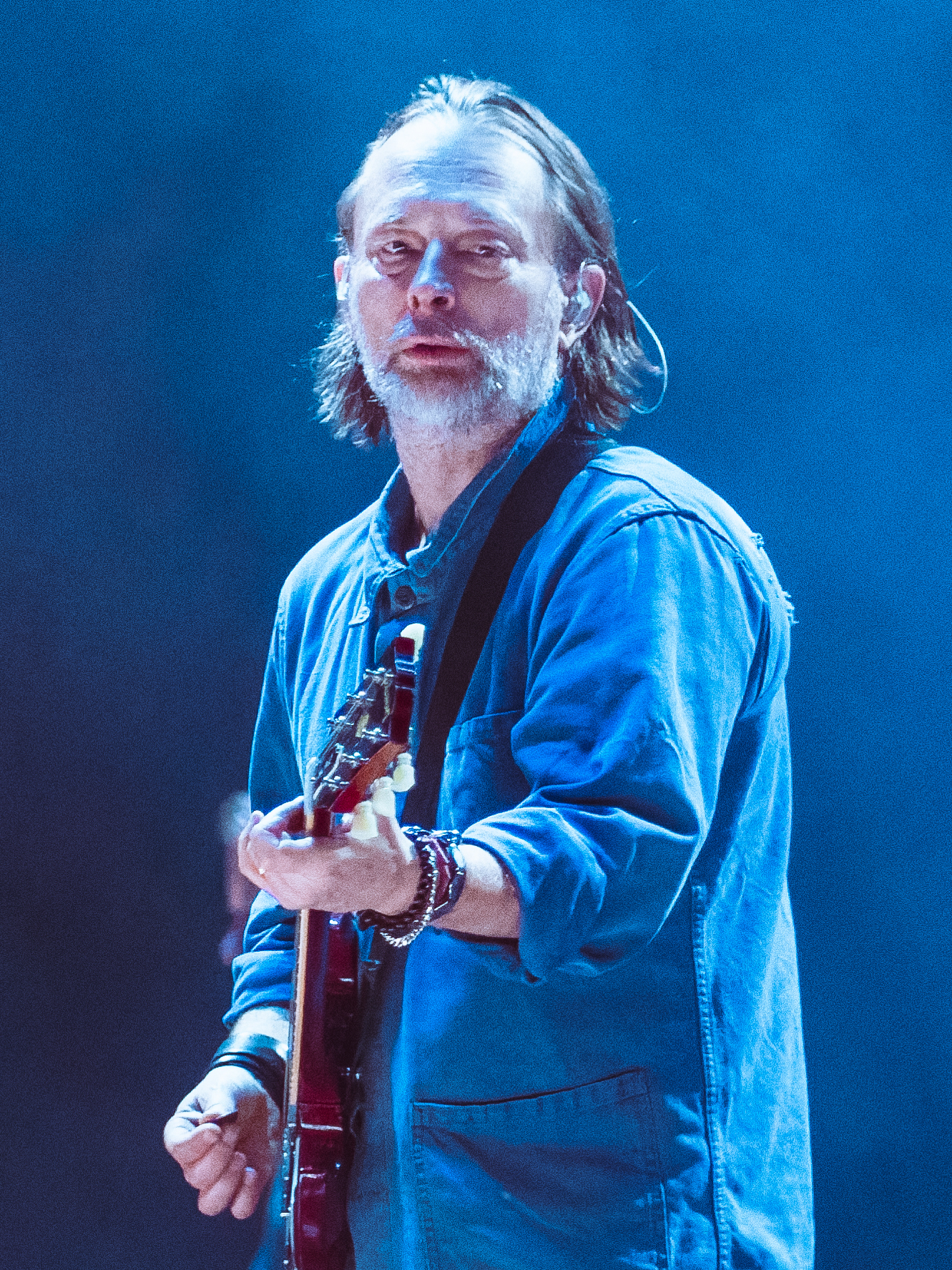
- Yorke performing with Radiohead in 2025

Background information
- Also known as: Sisi Bakbak; Tchock; the White Chocolate Farm
- Born: Thomas Edward Yorke; 7 October 1968 (age 58); Wellingborough, Northamptonshire, England
- Origin: Abingdon, Oxfordshire, England
- Genres: Art rock; alternative rock; electronica; experimental rock
- Occupations: Singer; songwriter; composer
- Instruments: Vocals; guitar; keyboards; bass guitar
- Works: Discography
- Years active: 1985–present
- Label: XL
- Member of: Radiohead; the Smile
- Formerly of: Atoms for Peace; the Venus in Furs
- Spouses: Rachel Owen (m. 2003; sep. 2015); Dajana Roncione (m. 2020)

Thomas Edward Yorke (born 7 October 1968) is an English musician who is the singer and main songwriter of the rock band Radiohead. He plays guitar, bass, keyboards and other instruments, and is noted for his wide vocal range. Rolling Stone described Yorke as one of the greatest and most influential singers of his generation.

Yorke formed Radiohead with schoolmates at Abingdon School in Oxfordshire. They gained notice with their debut single, "Creep" (1992), and went on to achieve acclaim and sales of more than 30 million albums. Yorke's early influences included alternative rock acts such as the Pixies and R.E.M. With Radiohead's fourth album, Kid A (2000), Yorke moved into electronic music, influenced by Warp artists such as Aphex Twin. For most of his career, he has worked with the producer Nigel Godrich. He designs artwork for Radiohead and his other projects with Stanley Donwood.

Yorke's solo work comprises mainly electronic music. His debut solo album, The Eraser, was released in 2006. To perform it live, he formed a new band, Atoms for Peace, with musicians including Godrich and the Red Hot Chili Peppers bassist Flea. They released an album, Amok, in 2013. Yorke released his second solo album, Tomorrow's Modern Boxes, in 2014, followed by Anima in 2019. In 2021, Yorke debuted a new band, the Smile, with the Radiohead guitarist Jonny Greenwood and the drummer Tom Skinner; they have released three albums. Yorke has collaborated with acts including Unkle, Burial, Four Tet, Mark Pritchard, PJ Harvey, Björk, Flying Lotus, Modeselektor and Clark, and has composed for film and theatre, including the films Suspiria (2018) and Confidenza (2024).

Yorke is an activist on behalf of environmental, trade justice and anti-war causes, and his lyrics incorporate political themes. He has been critical of the music industry, particularly of major labels and streaming services such as Spotify. With Radiohead and his solo work, he has employed alternative release platforms such as pay-what-you-want and BitTorrent. He was inducted into the Rock and Roll Hall of Fame as a member of Radiohead in 2019 and awarded an Ivor Novello fellowship in 2026.

== Early life ==
Yorke was born on 7 October 1968 in Wellingborough, Northamptonshire, and as a child lived in the Kingsway area. He was born with a paralysed left eye, and underwent five eye operations by the age of six. According to Yorke, the last surgery was "botched", giving him a drooping eyelid. He decided against further surgery: "I decided I liked the fact that it wasn't the same, and I've liked it ever since. And when people say stuff I kind of thought it was a badge of pride, and still do."

The family moved frequently. Shortly after Yorke's birth, his father, a nuclear physicist and later a chemical equipment salesman, was hired by a firm in Scotland. The family lived in Lundin Links in Fife until Yorke was seven, and he moved from school to school. They settled in Oxfordshire in 1978, where Yorke attended primary school in Standlake.

Yorke said he knew he would become a rock star after seeing the Queen guitarist Brian May on television for the first time at the age of eight. He received his first guitar as a child, and made his own guitar aged 10, inspired by May's homemade Red Special. By 11, he had joined his first band and written his first song. Yorke initially did not aim to become a singer, but had no one to sing the songs he was writing.

Yorke attended Abingdon, a private boys' school in Oxfordshire. He felt out of place and got into physical fights with other students. He found sanctuary in the music and art departments, and wrote music for a school production of A Midsummer Night's Dream. He performed a vocal recital of a Schubert piece, which helped him find the confidence to become a singer. He also had classical guitar lessons with his future bandmate Colin Greenwood. Terence Gilmore-James, the Abingdon director of music, recalled Yorke as "forlorn and a little isolated" thanks to his unusual appearance, but talkative and opinionated. He said Yorke was "not a great musician", unlike his future bandmate Jonny Greenwood, but a "thinker and experimenter". Yorke later credited the support of Gilmore-James and the head of the art department for his success.

=== 1985–1991: On a Friday ===
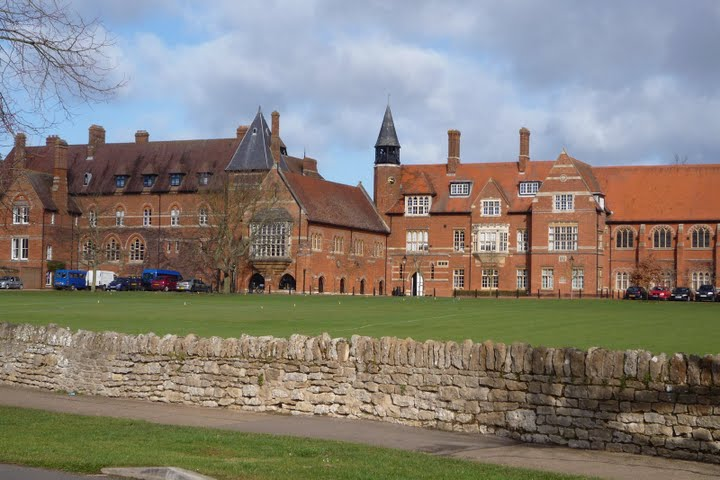
Abingdon School, Oxfordshire, where Yorke formed Radiohead with classmates

In sixth form at Abingdon, Yorke played with a punk band, TNT, but left when he was dissatisfied with their progress. He began playing with Colin Greenwood, Ed O'Brien and Philip Selway, joined later by Colin's younger brother, Jonny. In 1985, they formed a band, On a Friday, named after the only day they were allowed to practice. According to Selway, while each member contributed songs in the band's early period, Yorke emerged as the main songwriter. Seeing Siouxsie Sioux in concert at the Apollo that year inspired him to become a performer; he said he had never seen anyone "captivate an audience like she did".

After leaving Abingdon, Yorke took a gap year and tried to become a professional musician. He held several jobs, including a period selling suits and working in an architect's office, and made a demo tape. He was also involved in a serious car accident that influenced the lyrics of several later songs. In the late 1980s, Yorke made a solo album, Dearest, which O'Brien described as similar to the Jesus and Mary Chain, with delay and reverb effects.

On the strength of their first demo, On a Friday were offered a record deal by Island Records, but the members decided they were not ready and wanted to go to university first. Yorke had wanted to apply to St John's to read English at the University of Oxford, but, he said, "I was told I couldn't even apply – I was too thick. Oxford University would have eaten me up and spat me out. It's too rigorous." He also considered studying music, but could not read sheet music.

In late 1988, Yorke left Oxford to attend the University of Exeter, where he achieved a 2:1 in English and art. On a Friday entered hiatus aside from rehearsals during breaks. At Exeter, Yorke performed experimental music with a classical ensemble, played in the techno group Flickernoise, and played with the band Headless Chickens, performing songs including future Radiohead material. He also met Stanley Donwood, who would become Radiohead's cover artist, and his future wife, Rachel Owen. According to Yorke, his paintings at Exeter were "shit"; he was rejected by his classmates and "went AWOL for three months". Yorke credited his art school education for preparing him creatively for his later work.

On a Friday resumed activity in 1991 as most of the members were finishing their degrees. They gave their first interview, with the Oxford music magazine Curfew, while they were sharing a house in Oxford. Ronan Munro, the Curfew editor, recalled: "Thom wasn't like anyone I'd interviewed before ... He was like, 'This is going to happen... Failure is not an option.' [...] He wasn't some ranting diva or a megalomaniac, but he was so focused on what he wanted to do."

== Career ==
=== 1991–1993: "Creep" and rise to fame ===
In 1991, when Yorke was 22, On a Friday signed to EMI and changed their name to Radiohead. They gained notice with their debut single, "Creep", which appeared on their 1993 debut album, Pablo Honey. Yorke grew tired of "Creep" after it became a hit, and told Rolling Stone in 1993: "It's like it's not our song any more ... It feels like we're doing a cover."

According to Yorke, around this time he "hit the self-destruct button pretty quickly". He tried to project himself as a rock star and drank heavily, often becoming too drunk to perform. Yorke said: "When I got back to Oxford I was unbearable ... As soon as you get any success you disappear up your own arse." Years later, Yorke said he had found it difficult to cope with Radiohead's success: "I got angry ... I got more control-freakery. I put my hands on the steering wheel and I was white-knuckled, and I didn't care who I hurt or what I said." He later apologised to his bandmates for his behaviour.

=== 1994–1997: The Bends ===
Paul Q Kolderie, the co-producer of Pablo Honey, observed that Yorke's songwriting improved dramatically after Pablo Honey. O'Brien later said: "After all that touring on Pablo Honey ... the songs that Thom was writing were so much better. Over a period of a year and a half, suddenly, bang."

Recording Radiohead's second album, The Bends (1995), was stressful, as they felt pressured to release a follow-up to "Creep". Yorke in particular struggled. According to the band's co-manager, Chris Hufford, "Thom became totally confused about what he wanted to do, what he was doing in a band and in his life, and that turned into a mistrust of everybody else." Yorke said he had a "profound fear of having so much to prove". The Bends was engineered by Nigel Godrich, who became one of Yorke's longest-running collaborators.

The Bends received acclaim and brought Radiohead wider international attention. It influenced a generation of British and Irish alternative rock acts; The Observer wrote that it popularised an "angst-laden falsetto" which "eventually coalesced into an entire decade of sound". The American rock band R.E.M., a major influence on Radiohead, picked them as their support act for their European tour. Yorke befriended the singer, Michael Stipe, who gave him advice about how to deal with fame. Yorke joined R.E.M. to perform their song "E-Bow the Letter" on several occasions from 1998 to 2004.

=== 1997–1998: OK Computer ===
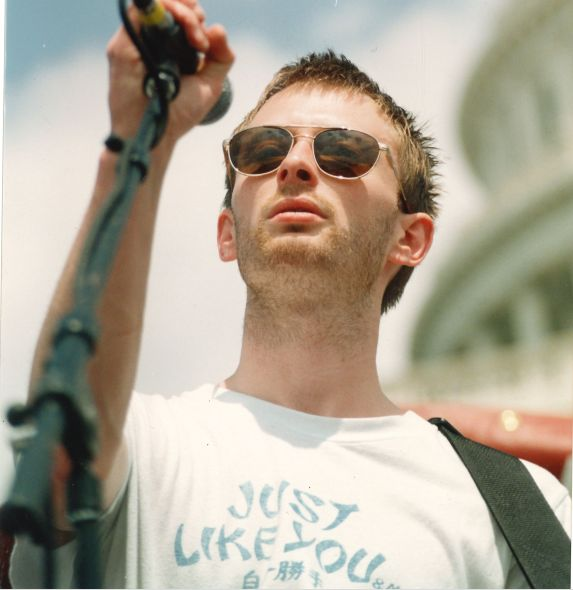
Yorke in 1998

During the production of Radiohead's third album, OK Computer (1997), the members had differing opinions and equal production roles, with Yorke having "the loudest voice", according to O'Brien. OK Computer achieved acclaim and strong sales, establishing Radiohead as one of the leading rock acts of the 1990s.

Yorke struggled with the attention the success brought him, and the stress of the OK Computer tour. Colin Greenwood described the "hundred-yard stare" in Yorke's eyes when performing, and said "he absolutely did not want to be there... You hate having to put your friend through that experience." Yorke said later that he had wrongly assumed that fame would "fill a gap".

In 1997, Yorke provided backing vocals for a cover of the 1975 Pink Floyd song "Wish You Were Here" with Sparklehorse. The following year, he duetted on "El President" with Isabel Monteiro of Drugstore, and sang on the Unkle track "Rabbit in Your Headlights", a collaboration with DJ Shadow. Pitchfork cited "Rabbit in Your Headlights" as a "turning point" for Yorke, foreshadowing his work in experimental electronic music.

For the soundtrack of the 1998 film Velvet Goldmine, Yorke, Jonny Greenwood, Andy Mackay of Roxy Music and Bernard Butler of Suede formed a band, the Venus in Furs, to cover Roxy Music songs. In 2016, Pitchfork wrote that Yorke "weirdly comes off as the weak link", with understated vocals that did not resemble the Roxy Music singer Bryan Ferry.

=== 1999–2004: Kid A, Amnesiac and Hail to the Thief ===
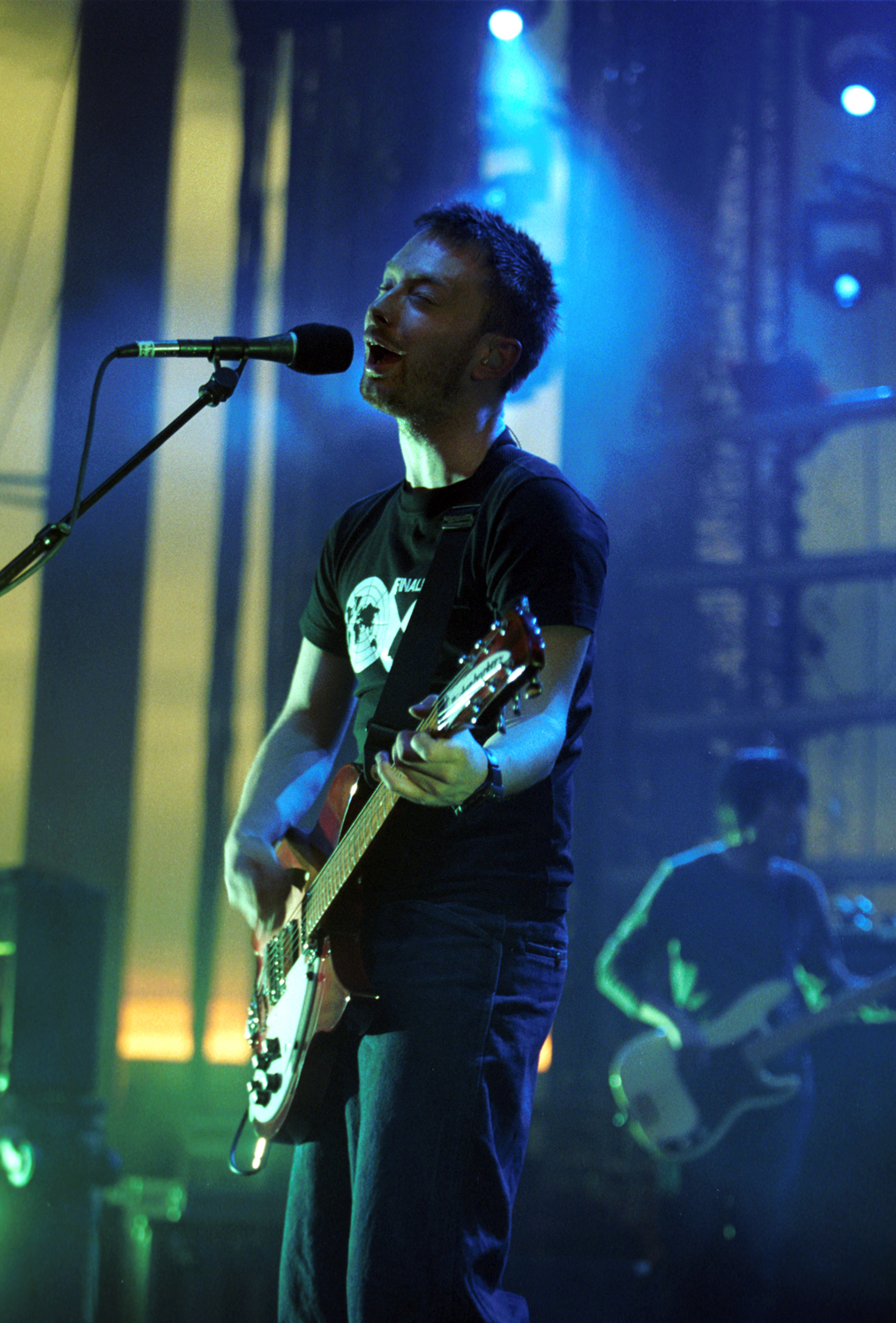
Yorke in 2001

Following the OK Computer tour, Yorke suffered a mental breakdown and found it impossible to write new music. He experienced impostor syndrome, and became self-critical and over-analytical. He was approached to score the 1999 film Fight Club, but declined as he was recovering from stress.

Around this period, acts influenced by Radiohead emerged, such as Travis and Coldplay. Yorke resented them, feeling they had copied him. He said in 2006: "I was really, really upset about it, and I tried my absolute best not to be, but yeah, it was kind of like— that sort of thing of missing the point completely." Godrich felt Yorke was oversensitive and told him he did not invent "guys singing in falsetto with an acoustic guitar". He saw Yorke's resentment as "a byproduct of being so focused on what he wanted to do that he figures he's the only person that's ever had that idea".

To recuperate, Yorke moved to Cornwall and spent time walking the cliffs, writing and drawing. He restricted his songwriting to piano; the first song he wrote was "Everything in Its Right Place". During this period, Yorke listened almost exclusively to the electronic music of acts released on Warp Records such as Aphex Twin and Autechre, saying: "It was refreshing because the music was all structures and had no human voices in it. But I felt just as emotional about it as I'd ever felt about guitar music." Yorke gradually relaxed and came to enjoy his work again.

Radiohead took Yorke's electronic influences to their next albums Kid A (2000) and Amnesiac (2001), processing vocals, obscuring lyrics, and using electronic instruments such as synthesisers, drum machines and samplers. The albums divided listeners, but were commercially successful and later attracted acclaim. Kid A was named the best album of the decade by Rolling Stone and Pitchfork.

Yorke contributed vocals to three tracks on the 2000 PJ Harvey album Stories from the City, Stories from the Sea, and duetted with Björk on her song "I've Seen It All" from her 2000 soundtrack album Selmasongs. "I've Seen It All" was nominated for an Academy Award for Best Original Song. In 2002, Yorke performed at the Bridge School Benefit, a charity concert organised by the Canadian songwriter Neil Young, one of Yorke's influences. His set included a cover of Young's 1970 song "After the Gold Rush", performed on the piano Young wrote it on.

Radiohead released their sixth album, Hail to the Thief, a blend of rock and electronic music, in 2003. Yorke wrote many of its lyrics in response to the war on terror, the resurgence of right-wing politics in the west after the turn of the millennium, and his shifting worldview after becoming a father. Yorke and Jonny Greenwood contributed to the 2004 Band Aid 20 single "Do They Know It's Christmas?", produced by Godrich.

=== 2004–2008: The Eraser and In Rainbows ===
Yorke recorded his debut solo album, The Eraser, during Radiohead's 2004 hiatus. It comprises electronics songs recorded and edited with computers. Yorke said he was curious to try working alone and stressed that Radiohead were not splitting up and that the album was made "with their blessing". According to Jonny Greenwood, Radiohead were happy for Yorke to make the album.

The Eraser was released in 2006 on the independent label XL Recordings, backed by the singles "Harrowdown Hill", which reached number 23 in the UK singles chart, and "Analyse". It reached the top ten in the UK, Ireland, United States, Canada and Australia, and was nominated for the 2006 Mercury Prize and the 2007 Grammy Award for Best Alternative Music Album. It was followed by the B-sides compilation Spitting Feathers and a remix album by various artists, The Eraser Rmxs. In 2005, Yorke performed on the pilot episode of the music television program From the Basement, created by Godrich.

In 2007, Radiohead independently released their seventh album, In Rainbows, as a pay-what-you-want download, the first for a major act. The release made headlines worldwide and sparked debate about the implications for the music industry. Yorke described it as a statement of Radiohead's belief in the value of music and a "contract of faith" between musicians and audiences. In the same year, Yorke sang on the Modeselektor track "The White Flash" from the album Happy Birthday!. Pitchfork likened it to The Eraser and wrote that Yorke's vocals "work so perfectly that it feels like this is his band". Yorke also sang backing vocals on Björk's 2008 charity single "Náttúra".

=== 2009–2010: Atoms for Peace ===
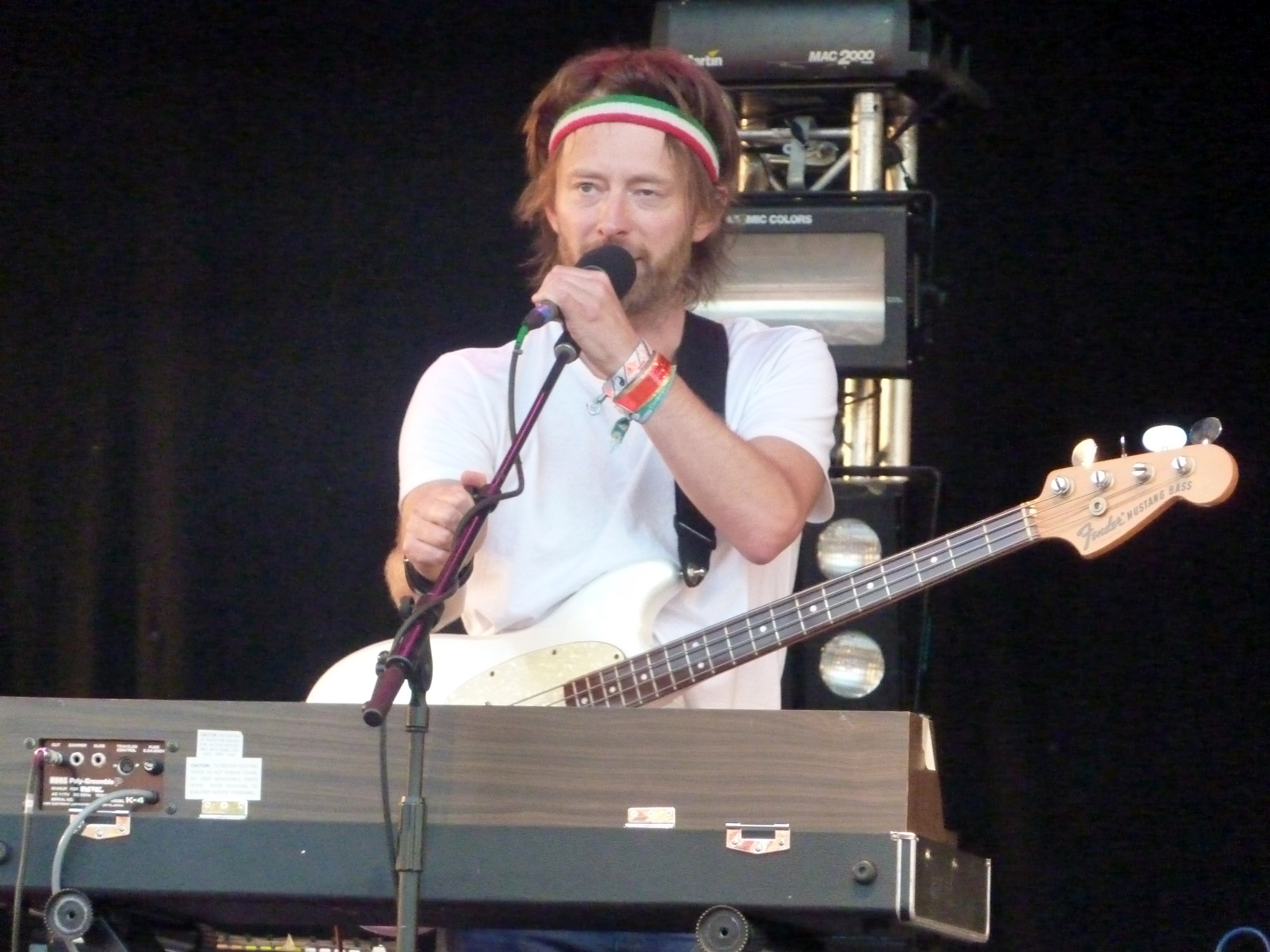
Yorke performing at Glastonbury Festival 2010

In 2009, Yorke released a cover of the Miracle Legion song "All for the Best" with his brother, Andy, for the compilation Ciao My Shining Star: The Songs of Mark Mulcahy. In July, he performed solo at Latitude Festival in Suffolk and released a double-A-side single, "FeelingPulledApartByHorses/TheHollowEarth". He also contributed the track "Hearing Damage" to the Twilight Saga: New Moon film soundtrack.

That year, Yorke formed a new band, Atoms for Peace, to perform songs from The Eraser. Alongside Yorke, the band comprises Godrich on keyboards and guitar, the bassist Flea of the Red Hot Chili Peppers, the drummer Joey Waronker and the percussionist Mauro Refosco of Forro in the Dark. Yorke said: "God love 'em but I've been playing with [Radiohead] since I was 16, and to do this was quite a trip ... It felt like we'd knocked a hole in a wall, and we should just fucking go through it."

Atoms for Peace performed eight North American shows in 2010. They went unnamed for early performances, billed as "Thom Yorke" or "??????". In February, Yorke performed a benefit concert at the Cambridge Corn Exchange for the British Green Party. In June, he performed a surprise set at Glastonbury Festival 2010 with Jonny Greenwood, performing Eraser and Radiohead songs.

Yorke created two remixes of the 2010 single "Gazzillion Ear" by the rapper MF Doom. The second remix went unreleased until 2021, after MF Doom's death. Yorke provided vocals for "...And the World Laughs with You" from the Flying Lotus album Cosmogramma in 2010, and for "Shipwreck" and "This" on the Modeselektor album Monkeytown in 2011. He joined Modeselektor to perform "Shipwreck" at Coachella in April 2012. Along with Damien Rice and Philip Glass, he contributed to the soundtrack for the 2010 documentary When the Dragon Swallowed the Sun.

=== 2011–2013: The King of Limbs and Amok ===
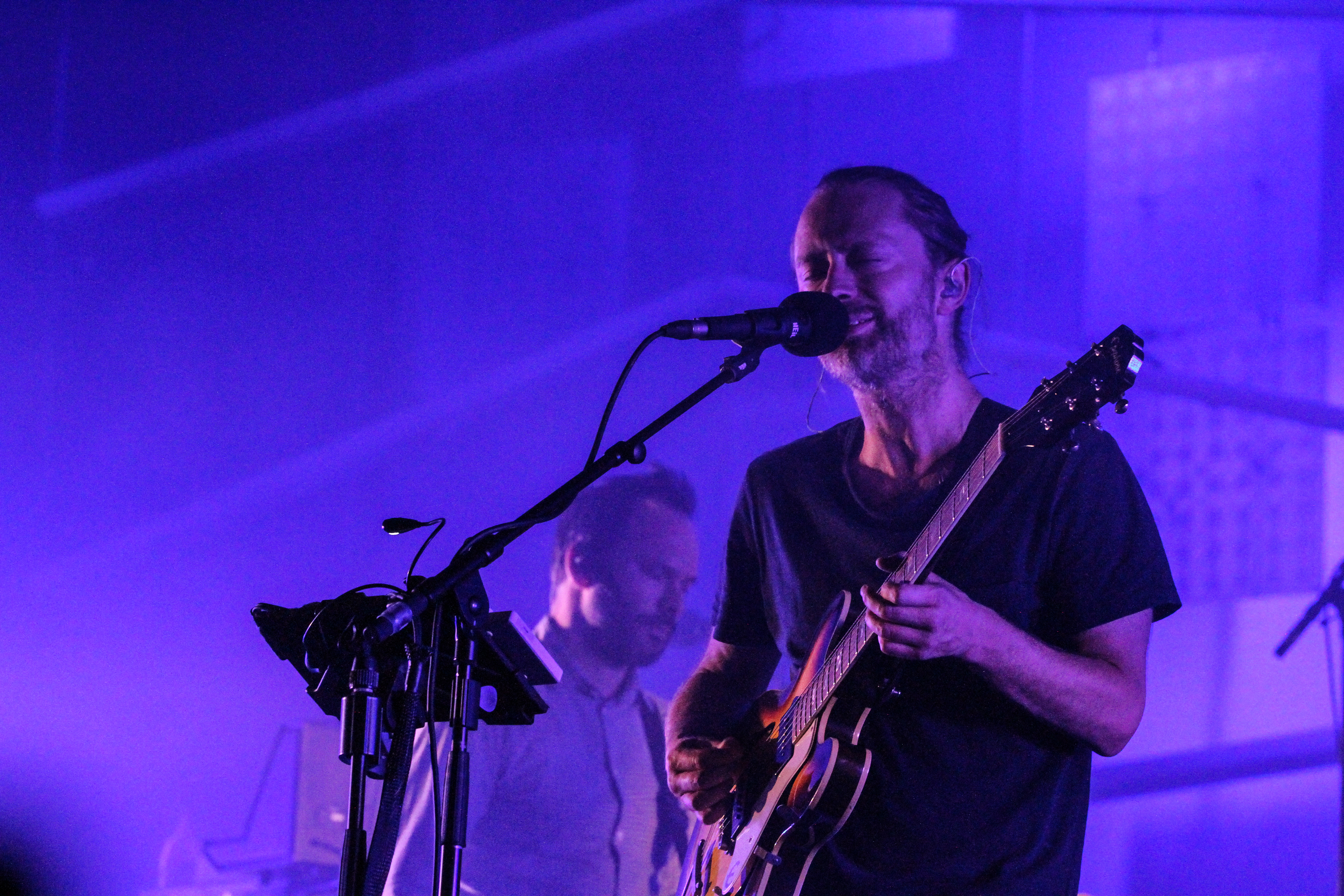
Yorke performing with Atoms for Peace in 2013

In 2011, Radiohead released their eighth album, The King of Limbs, which Yorke described as "an expression of physical movements and wildness". Yorke sought to move further from conventional recording methods. The music video for "Lotus Flower", featuring Yorke's erratic dancing, became an internet meme. By 2011, Radiohead had sold more than 30 million albums.

In the same year, Yorke collaborated with the electronic artists Burial and Four Tet on "Ego" and "Mirror", and he and Greenwood collaborated with MF Doom on "Retarded Fren". In 2012, Yorke contributed music to a show by the fashion label Rag & Bone, and sang on "Electric Candyman" on the Flying Lotus album Until the Quiet Comes. He also remixed the single "Hold On" by the electronic musician Sbtrkt, under the name Sisi BakBak. His identity was not confirmed until September 2014.

In February 2013, Atoms for Peace released an album, Amok, followed by a tour of Europe, the US and Japan. Amok received generally positive reviews, though some critics felt it was too similar to Yorke's solo work. That year, Yorke and Jonny Greenwood contributed music to The UK Gold, a documentary about tax avoidance. The soundtrack, described by Rolling Stone as a series of "minimalist soundscapes", was released free in February 2015 through the online music platform SoundCloud.

=== 2014–2017: Tomorrow's Modern Boxes and A Moon Shaped Pool ===
Yorke recorded his second solo album, Tomorrow's Modern Boxes, while his first wife, Rachel Owen, was ill with cancer. Yorke described it as a "very bleak period ... It was like a miracle that I could even bring myself to go into the studio at all." The album was released via BitTorrent on 26 September 2014, and became the most torrented of 2014 (excluding piracy), with more than a million downloads in its first six days. Yorke and Godrich hoped to use the BitTorrent release to hand "some control of internet commerce back to people who are creating the work". In December, Yorke released the album on the online music platform Bandcamp along with a new track, "Youwouldn'tlikemewhenI'mangry".

In 2015, Yorke contributed a soundtrack, Subterranea, to an installation of Radiohead artwork, The Panic Office, in Sydney, Australia. The soundtrack was composed of field recordings made in the English countryside and played on speakers at different heights with different frequency ranges. The radio station Triple J described it as similar to the ambient sections of Tomorrow's Modern Boxes, with some digitally spoken sections similar to "Fitter Happier" from OK Computer. The music was not released.

Yorke composed music for a 2015 production of Harold Pinter's 1971 play Old Times by the Roundabout Theatre Company in New York City. The director described the music as "primeval, unusual ... The sort of neurosis within [Yorke's] music certainly has elucidated elements of the compulsive repetition of the play." At Latitude Festival in July 2015, Yorke played a surprise set, playing songs from The Eraser and Tomorrow's Modern Boxes, and joined the band Portishead to perform their song "The Rip". In August, Yorke performed at Summer Sonic Festival in Tokyo, accompanied by Godrich and the audiovisual artist Tarik Barri.

Radiohead released their ninth album, A Moon Shaped Pool, on 8 May 2016. Several critics felt its lyrics were coloured by Yorke's separation from Owen. Spencer Kornhaber of the Atlantic wrote that it "makes the most sense when heard as a document of a wrenching chapter for one human being". Yorke contributed vocals and appeared in the video for "Beautiful People" from Mark Pritchard's 2016 album Under the Sun. In August 2017, Yorke and Jonny Greenwood performed a benefit concert in the Marche, Italy, to help restoration efforts following the August 2016 Central Italy earthquake.

=== 2018–2019: Suspiria ===
Yorke's first feature film soundtrack, Suspiria, composed for the 2018 horror film, was released on 26 October 2018 by XL. It was Yorke's first project since The Bends not to feature production from his longtime collaborator Nigel Godrich; instead, he produced it with Sam Petts-Davies. It features the London Contemporary Orchestra and Choir, and Yorke's son, Noah, on drums. Yorke cited inspiration from the 1982 Blade Runner soundtrack and music from Suspiria's 1977 Berlin setting, such as krautrock. The lyrics do not follow the film narrative and were influenced by discourse surrounding President Donald Trump and Brexit. "Suspirium" was nominated for Best Song Written for Visual Media at the 2020 Grammy Awards.

Yorke performed three US shows in December 2017, and toured Europe and the US in 2018. That year, he and Barri created an audiovisual exhibition, "City Rats", commissioned by the Institute for Sound and Music in Berlin. I See You, a limited-edition zine edited by Yorke with Crack Magazine, was published in September 2018, with profits donated to Greenpeace. Yorke contributed music to the 2018 short film "Why Can't We Get Along?" for Rag & Bone.

=== 2019–2020: Anima ===
In March 2019, Yorke performed at Letters Live, a staged reading at Union Chapel, Islington, in which actors and artists read letters. He read a letter written to the Guardian about the French burqa ban. On 29 March, Yorke was inducted into the Rock and Roll Hall of Fame as a member of Radiohead. He did not attend the induction ceremony, citing cultural differences with the US and his negative experience of the Brit Awards, "which is like this sort of drunken car crash".

Yorke's first classical composition, "Don't Fear the Light", written for the piano duo Katia and Marielle Labeque, debuted in April 2019. For the 2019 film Motherless Brooklyn, Yorke wrote "Daily Battles", with horns by his Atoms for Peace bandmate Flea. The director, Edward Norton, enlisted the jazz musician Wynton Marsalis to rearrange it as a ballad reminiscent of 1950s Miles Davis. It was shortlisted for Best Original Song at the 92nd Academy Awards.

Yorke's third solo album, Anima, was released on 27 June. It became Yorke's first number-one album on the Billboard Dance/Electronic Albums chart. At the 2020 Grammy Awards, it was nominated for Best Alternative Music Album and Best Boxed or Special Limited Edition Package. Philip Sherburne of Pitchfork wrote that it was Yorke's most ambitious and assured solo album and the first that felt complete without Radiohead. Anima was accompanied by a short film directed by Paul Thomas Anderson, which was nominated for the Grammy for Best Music Film. In August, Yorke released Not the News Rmx EP, comprising an extended version of the Anima track "Not the News" plus remixes by various artists. A solo tour set to begin in March 2020 was canceled due to the COVID-19 pandemic.

In April 2020, Yorke performed a new song from his home, "Plasticine Figures", for The Tonight Show. In the same year, he collaborated with Four Tet and Burial again on "Her Revolution" and "His Rope", and remixed "Isolation Theme" by the electronic musician Clark. Yorke said his remix mirrored the COVID-19 lockdowns, "entering a new type of silence".

=== 2021–2022: the Smile ===
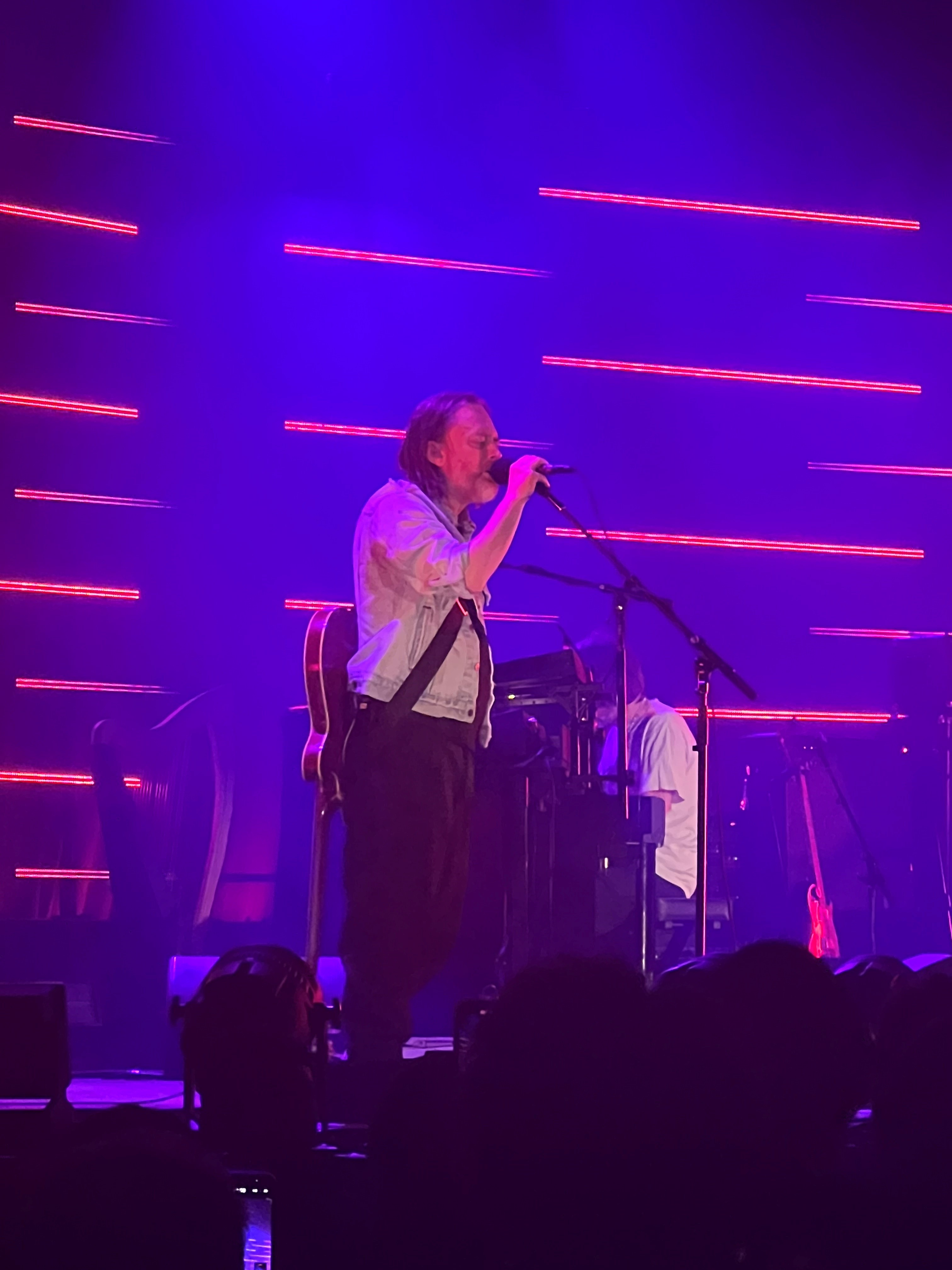
Yorke performing with the Smile in 2022

In March 2021, Yorke contributed music to shows by the Japanese fashion designer Jun Takahashi, including a remix of "Creep". In May, Yorke debuted a new band, the Smile, with Jonny Greenwood and the jazz drummer Tom Skinner, produced by Godrich. Greenwood said the project was a way for him and Yorke to work together during the COVID-19 lockdowns. The Smile made their surprise debut in a performance streamed by Glastonbury Festival on May 22. Critics interpreted the Smile as a liberating, lower-pressure project for Yorke and Greenwood, with more jazz, krautrock and progressive rock influences and a looser, wilder sound.

In October 2021, Yorke performed a Smile song, "Free in the Knowledge", at the Letters Live event at the Royal Albert Hall, London. In the same month, Yorke and the Radiohead cover artist, Stanley Donwood, curated an exhibition of Kid A artwork and lyrics at Christie's headquarters in London, ahead of a reissued package of the Kid A and Amnesia albums, Kid A Mnesia. They also contributed lyrics and artwork to Kid A Mnesia Exhibition, a free digital experience for PlayStation 5, macOS and Windows.

On 9 April 2022, Yorke performed a solo concert at the Zeltbühne festival in Zermatt, Switzerland, playing songs from across his career. In May, the Smile released their debut album, A Light for Attracting Attention, and began a European tour. Yorke wrote two songs, "5.17" and "That's How Horses Are", for the sixth series of the television drama Peaky Blinders, broadcast in 2022.

=== 2023–2024: further Smile records and Confidenza ===
Yorke executive-produced the tenth album by Clark, Sus Dog (2023), contributing vocals and bass and acting as a mentor for Clark's vocals. In September 2023, Yorke and Donwood exhibited a selection of artwork, The Crow Flies, in London. The paintings, based on Islamic pirate maps and 1960s US military topographic charts, began as work for A Light For Attracting Attention. The Smile toured internationally between 2022 and 2024. In 2024, they released the albums Wall of Eyes and Cutouts, recorded simultaneously.

Yorke composed the score for the 2024 film Confidenza by the Italian filmmaker Daniele Luchetti. It features the London Contemporary Orchestra and a jazz ensemble including Skinner. On 22 April, Yorke released two tracks from the soundtrack, "Knife Edge" and "Prize Giving". The soundtrack was released on 26 April.

Yorke produced "Stepdaughter", a song written and performed by his wife, Dajana Roncione, and released in November 2024. It was written for the Italian film Eternal Visionary, directed by Michele Placido and starring Roncione. In October, Yorke began the Everything tour of New Zealand, Australia, Singapore and Japan, performing songs from across his career. A concert film, Thom Yorke Live at Sydney Opera House, premiered on 20 January 2026 in Sydney, Australia.

=== 2025–present: Hamlet Hail to the Thief, Tall Tales and art exhibitions ===
Yorke reworked Hail to the Thief for Hamlet Hail to the Thief, a production of Hamlet that opened at Aviva Studios, Manchester, in April 2025. He said Hail to the Thief "chimes with the underlying grief and paranoia" of Hamlet. Yorke collaborated again with the electronic musician Mark Pritchard to create the album Tall Tales, released through Warp Records on 9 May, 2025. The project began during the COVID-19 lockdowns, with Pritchard and Yorke exchanging recordings online. In May, Yorke contributed the song "Dialing In" to the Apple TV+ series Smoke. It was formerly titled "Gawpers" and performed by Yorke with Katia and Marielle Labeque in 2019.

This Is What You Get, an exhibition of Yorke and Donwood's artwork, opened in August 2025 at the Ashmolean Museum in Oxford. The Guardian gave the exhibition two out of five, writing that the work did not "stand up to scrutiny when removed from the context of the records and merchandise it was designed for ... from an art perspective it is a succession of bad paintings". The Times argued that the artwork stood alone, and the Independent wrote that it was "a marvellously accessible exhibition". In November and December, Radiohead toured Europe, their first tour in seven years.

Yorke co-wrote "Traffic Lights" from Flea's 2026 debut solo album Honora. Flea invited Yorke to contribute as it reminded him of their work in Atoms for Peace. Yorke performed it with Flea as a surprise guest at Flea's show in Koko, London, in May. That month, Yorke and Donwood's first overseas exhibition, "No Go Elevator (Not Without No Keycard)", opened in Venice, depicting "unnerving, isolated terrains". At the Ivor Novello Awards that month, Yorke was awarded a fellowship. He thanked his collaborators, read a speech attacking major labels and streaming services, and performed the Radiohead song "Jigsaw Falling Into Place" and a new song, "Space Walk". In an interview afterwards, Yorke said he was completing a new solo album, which was "pretty fucking different for me".

== Artistry ==
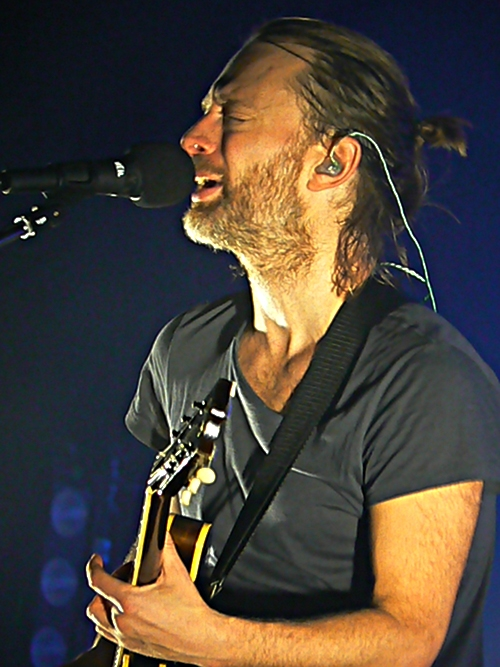
Yorke performing with Atoms for Peace in 2013

Yorke writes the first versions of most Radiohead songs, after which they are developed harmonically by Jonny Greenwood before the other band members develop their parts. According to Yorke, Greenwood is "more impatient" and eager to move to the next idea, whereas he enjoys editing and perfecting songs.

Yorke's solo work comprises mainly electronic music. Stereogum characterised it as "largely interior", "frigid" and "beat-driven", unlike the "wide-open horizons" of Radiohead songs. Rolling Stone wrote: "Radiohead's music sounds like it's written to bring people in, while Yorke's electronic-leaning solo work ... is prone to keep the listener at an icy distance."

Yorke has worked with the producer Nigel Godrich on most of his projects, including Radiohead, Atoms for Peace, the first Smile record and most of his solo work. He credits Godrich with helping edit his work, identifying which parts need improvement and which have potential. He said they sometimes had arguments that last for days, but that they always resolve their differences and likened him to a brother. Godrich said the pair were "very productive together and that's a really precious and important thing and it changes within the context of whatever we're doing".

Yorke said the nature of being a creative person was "to retain a beginner's mind. The search is the point. The flailing around is the point. The process is the point." He said he used to be more controlling in the studio, but learnt to be more relaxed and open to new ideas. He likened the creative process to surfing: "You can sit out there on a board for ages waiting for the right wave to come along. You can't get angry about it. You know it will happen eventually and you start to understand the waiting itself might be part of it." In 2026, Yorke said he was "not a solo artist" and would "go round in circles" when working alone. He described his creative partnerships as "very precious and very fragile".

=== Instruments ===
Yorke is a multi-instrumentalist, and plays instruments including guitar, piano, bass and drums. He played drums for performances of the 2007 Radiohead song "Bangers and Mash". With the Smile, Yorke has used a Fender Mustang bass with a fingerstyle technique. Yorke uses electronic instruments by manufacturers including Elektron and Sequential and electronic techniques including programming, sampling and looping. In 2015, he said: "Really I just enjoy writing words sitting at a piano. I tend to lose interest in the drum machine." According to Godrich, "Thom will sit down and make some crazy, fractured cheese-grater-on-head mayhem on a computer, but at some point he always gets his guitar out to check he can actually play it."

Unlike Greenwood, Yorke does not read sheet music. He said: "You can't express the rhythms properly like that. It's a very ineffective way of doing it, so I've never really bothered picking it up." Explaining why he declined an invitation to play piano on "Mr. Bellamy" on Paul McCartney's album Memory Almost Full (2007), Yorke said: "The piano playing involved two hands doing things separately. I don't have that skill available. I said to him, 'I strum piano, that's it.'"

=== Vocals ===
Yorke has one of the widest vocal ranges in popular music. He is known for his falsetto, which Paste described as "sweet", "cautious" and "haunting". Rolling Stone described his voice as a "broad, emotive sweep" with a "high, keening sound". The Guardian described it as "instrument-like" and "spectral", and wrote that it "transcends the egocentric posturing of the indie rock singer stereotype". Consequence wrote that Yorke prioritises emotion over technique, and that his voice ranges from "delicate, almost breathless vulnerability" to "fearless experimentation". The critic Robert Christgau wrote that Yorke's voice has "a pained, transported intensity, pure up top with hints of hysterical grit below ... Fraught and self-involved with no time for jokes, not asexual but otherwise occupied, and never ever common, this is the idealised voice of a pretentious college boy ... Like it or not the voice is remarkable."

Yorke often manipulates his voice with software and effects, transforming it into a "disembodied instrument". For example, on "Everything in Its Right Place" (2000), his vocals are treated to create a "glitching, stuttering collage". In 2016, Pitchfork wrote that Yorke's voice had evolved from "semi-interesting alt-rocker" to "left-field art-rock demigod" to "electronic grand wizard". In 2006, Yorke said: "It annoys me how pretty my voice is. That sounds incredibly immodest, but it annoys me how polite it can sound when perhaps what I'm singing is deeply acidic." He said he keeps vocals in mind whenever he builds music, no matter the genre, and that he found it difficult to listen to dance music without imagining a voice. In 2023, Yorke said that his vocal range had dropped with age and that he now found "Creep" difficult to sing.

In 2010, Rolling Stone ranked Yorke the 66th-greatest singer and wrote that he was one of the most influential singers of his generation, influencing bands such as Muse, Coldplay, Travis and Elbow. In their updated 2023 list, Rolling Stone ranked Yorke the 34th-greatest singer, praising his "genuine edge of alienation". In 2026, Consequence named Yorke the 52nd-greatest.

=== Lyrics ===
Yorke's early lyrics were personal, but he found that "tortured" lyrics became tired. He said his lyrics were not "some deep heartfelt thing"; instead, he likened them to a collage assembled from images and external sources such as television. From Kid A, he experimented with cutting up words and phrases and assembling them at random. He sometimes chooses words for their sounds rather than meanings, such as the title phrase of "Myxomatosis" or the repeated phrase "the rain drops" on "Sit Down. Stand Up". A 2021 study found that Yorke had among the largest vocabularies of pop singers, based on the number of different words used in each song.

Yorke deliberately uses cliches, idioms and other common expressions, inspired by the American artist Barbara Kruger. For example, according to the Pitchfork writer Rob Mitchum, the Kid A lyrics feature "hum-drum observations twisted into panic attacks". Another Pitchfork writer, Jayson Greene, said the approach suggested "a mind consumed by meaningless data". Yorke said he hoped to capture the everyday experience of trying to make emotional sense of words and images, and that "lyrics should be a series of windows opening rather than shutting, which is incredibly hard to do". Colin Greenwood described Yorke's lyrics as "a running commentary on what's happening in the world ... like a shutter snapping in succession".

The New Republic writer Ryan Kearney speculated that Yorke's use of common expressions, which he described as "Radioheadisms", was an attempt "to sap our common tongue of meaning and expose the vapidity of everyday discourse". Kearney felt the approach had become a crutch for Yorke, creating a "senseless mush". He wrote in 2016 that he was "the most overrated lyricist in music today", and that fans, critics and academics had "taken the bait and delivered one overwrought interpretation after another".

Yorke said his lyrics were motivated by anger, expressing his political and environmental concerns and written as "a constant response to doublethink". The lyrics of the 2003 Radiohead album Hail to the Thief dealt with what Yorke called the "ignorance and intolerance and panic and stupidity" following the 2000 election of US President George W. Bush and the unfolding war on terror. Yorke wrote his 2006 single "Harrowdown Hill" about David Kelly, the British weapons expert and whistleblower. In a 2008 television performance of "House of Cards", Yorke dedicated the "denial, denial" refrain to Bush for rejecting the Kyoto Protocol, an international treaty to reduce greenhouse gases. The 2011 single "The Daily Mail" attacks the right-wing Daily Mail newspaper.

Many of Yorke's lyrics express paranoia. The Guardian critic Alexis Petridis described "what you might call the Yorke worldview: that life is a waking nightmare and everything is completely and perhaps irreparably screwed". In a 2015 interview with the activist and writer George Monbiot, Yorke said: "In the 60s, you could write songs that were like calls to arms, and it would work ... It's much harder to do that now. If I was going to write a protest song about climate change in 2015, it would be shit. It's not like one song or one piece of art or one book is going to change someone's mind." Working on Radiohead's ninth album, A Moon Shaped Pool, Yorke worried that political songs alienated some listeners, but decided it was better than writing "another lovey-dovey song about nothing".

Greene wrote that Yorke's lyrics on A Moon Shaped Pool were less cynical, conveying wonder and amazement. Many critics felt the lyrics might address Yorke's separation from Rachel Owen, his partner of more than 20 years. Yorke denied writing biographically, saying he instead writes "spasmodic" lyrics based on imagery.

=== Dance ===
Yorke often incorporates dance into his performances and music videos, described by the Sunday Times as his "on-stage signature". He began dancing on stage after Radiohead released Kid A in 2000, as many songs did not require him to play guitar. The New York Times contrasted Yorke's "tortured" 1990s appearance with his later "looser", more comfortable performances. He said he enjoyed "messing around with the idea of being the rock star or the uptight [1990s] guy. I can choose to do something completely different and be stupid or jump around."

Yorke's dancing features in music videos for songs such as "Lotus Flower" and "Ingenue", and the short film Anima. He has worked with dancers and choreographers such as Merce Cunningham, Wayne McGregor and Darius Khondji. Critics have described his dancing as "erratic", "flailing" and unconventional. The Washington Post critic Sarah Kaufman described his dancing as "raw, personal and seemingly spontaneous ... It is distinctly Yorke-ish: subtle, lyrical, emanating from deep wells of feeling." In 2011, Rolling Stone readers voted Yorke their 10th-favourite dancing musician.

=== Influences ===
As a child, Yorke's favourite artists included Queen, R.E.M., Siouxsie and the Banshees, Joy Division and Bob Dylan. He initially attempted to emulate singers including Michael Stipe, Morrissey and David Sylvian. He also wrote that Mark Mulcahy of Miracle Legion had affected him "a great deal" at this time: "It was the voice of someone who was only truly happy when he was singing ... It changed the way I thought about songs and singing."

When he was 16, Yorke sent a demo to a music magazine, who wrote that he sounded like Neil Young. Unfamiliar with Young, Yorke purchased his 1970 album After the Gold Rush, which gave him the confidence to reveal "softness and naiveté" in his singing. Yorke also credited Young as a lyrical influence. He said: "It was his attitude toward the way he laid songs down. It's always about laying down whatever is in your head at the time and staying completely true to that, no matter what it is." Yorke said Jeff Buckley gave him the confidence to use falsetto and be vulnerable in his singing, while the 1986 album Blood & Chocolate by Elvis Costello and the Attractions changed how he approached recording and writing music and lyrics.

Yorke cited the Pixies, Björk and PJ Harvey as artists who "changed his life", and in 2006 he told Pitchfork that Radiohead had "ripped off R.E.M. blind for years". He cited Stipe as his favourite lyricist: "I loved the way he would take an emotion and then take a step back from it and in doing so make it so much more powerful." The chorus of "How to Disappear Completely" from Kid A was inspired by Stipe, who advised Yorke to relieve tour stress by repeating to himself: "I'm not here, this isn't happening." Yorke cited Scott Walker as an influence on his vocals and lyrics, and the Red Hot Chili Peppers guitarist John Frusciante as an influence on his guitar playing on In Rainbows. Yorke admired how the Beastie Boys worked independently despite being signed to a major record label, and was influenced by their activism, such as their Tibetan Freedom Concerts.

Beginning with Kid A, Radiohead incorporated influences from electronic artists on the Warp label, such as Aphex Twin and Autechre. In 2013, Yorke cited Aphex Twin as his biggest influence, saying: "Aphex opened up another world that didn't involve my fucking electric guitar ... I hated all the music that was around Radiohead at the time, it was completely fucking meaningless. I hated the Britpop thing and what was happening in America, but Aphex was totally beautiful." He cited the 1962 live album The Complete Town Hall Concert by the jazz musician Charles Mingus as another formative influence during this period.

=== Visual art ===
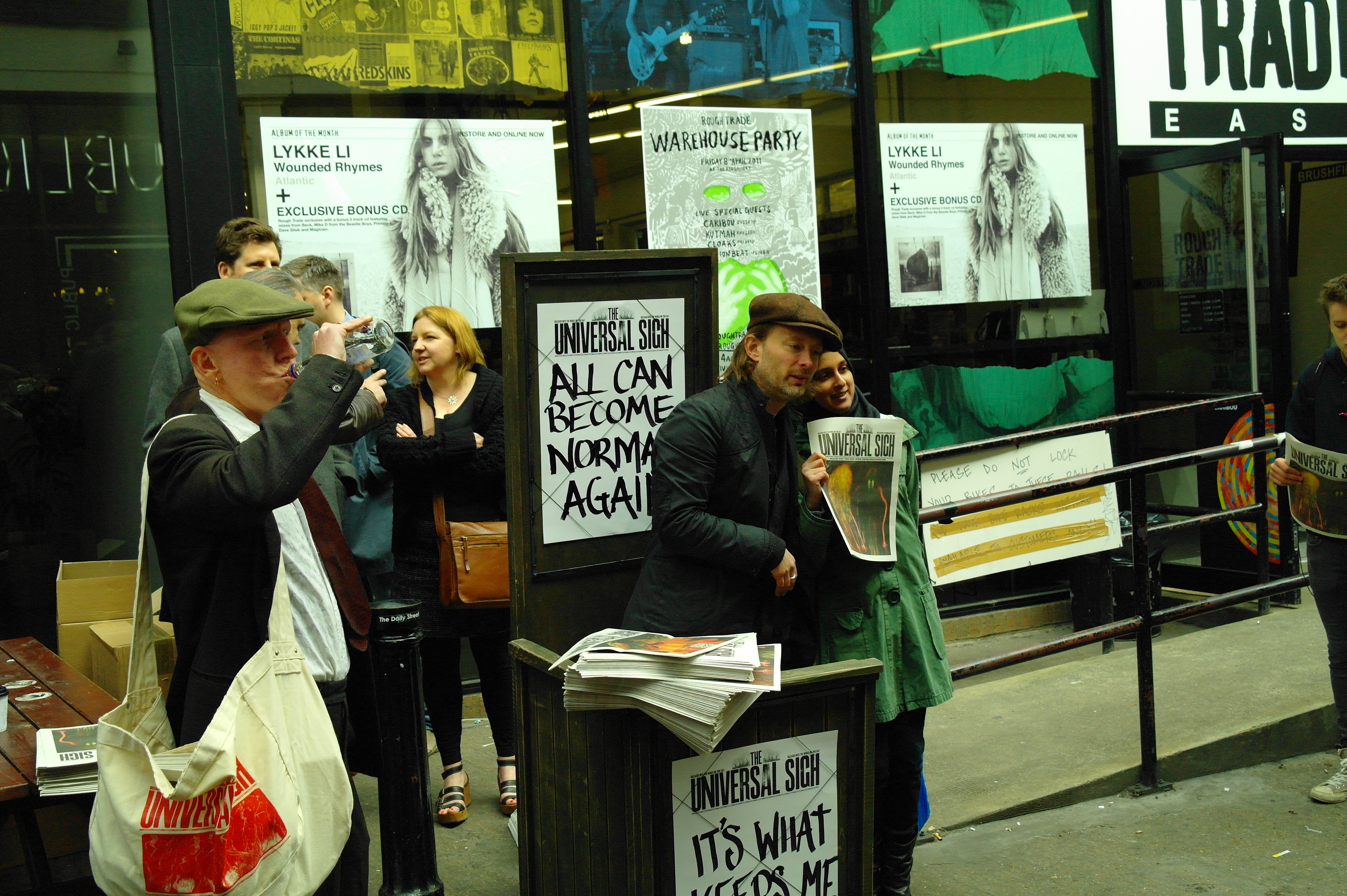
The Radiohead cover artist Stanley Donwood (left) and Yorke promoting The King of Limbs in 2011

Since the 1994 Radiohead EP My Iron Lung, Yorke has designed artwork and merchandise for Radiohead and his other projects with Stanley Donwood. Yorke is credited as the White Chocolate Farm, Tchock, Dr. Tchock and similar abbreviations.

Yorke and Donwood met as art students at the University of Exeter. Donwood said his first impression of Yorke was that he was "mouthy", "pissed off" and "someone I could work with". Whereas Donwood described himself as having a tendency towards "detailing and perfectionism", he said Yorke is "completely opposed, fucking everything up ... I do something, then he fucks it up, then I fuck up what he's done ... and we keep doing that until we're happy with the result. It's a competition to see who 'wins' the painting, which one of us takes possession of it in an artistic way." While Yorke described his earlier collaborations with Donwood as more "supervisory", he spent more time painting with him for the Smile album covers, particularly during the COVID-19 pandemic.

Though Yorke studied at art school, he was reluctant to describe himself as a visual artist for years and focused on music. He felt that in the 1990s there was a sense that "a musician could not possibly be an artist and vice versa". In 2025, the Guardian wrote that Donwood and Yorke had "created some of the most recognisable, ubiquitous and maybe even iconic album covers of their generation". The artist Tarik Barri provides live visuals for Yorke's solo and multimedia projects and shows with Atoms for Peace.

== Politics and activism ==
=== Music industry ===
Yorke has been critical of the music industry. Following Radiohead's tour of America in 1993, he became disenchanted with being "right at the sharp end of the sexy, sassy, MTV eye-candy lifestyle" he felt he was helping sell. After a 1995 Melody Maker article suggested that Yorke would kill himself like the Nirvana singer Kurt Cobain, Yorke developed an aversion to the British music press. In November 1995, NME covered an incident in which Yorke became sick and collapsed on stage at a show in Munich, and titled the story "Thommy's temper tantrum". Yorke said it was the most hurtful thing anyone had written about him and refused to give interviews to NME for five years.

The 1998 documentary Meeting People Is Easy portrays Yorke's disaffection with the music industry and press during Radiohead's OK Computer tour. After Radiohead's fourth album, Kid A (2000), was leaked via the peer-to-peer filesharing software Napster weeks before release, Yorke told Time he felt Napster "encourages enthusiasm for music in a way that the music industry has long forgotten to do. I think anybody sticking two fingers up at the whole fucking thing is wonderful as far as I'm concerned." In 2001, Yorke criticised the American live music industry, describing it as a monopoly controlled by Clear Channel Entertainment and Ticketmaster.

With Radiohead and his solo work, Yorke has pioneered alternative release platforms. After Radiohead's record contract with EMI ended with the release of Hail to the Thief (2003), Yorke told Time: "I like the people at our record company, but the time is at hand when you have to ask why anyone needs one. And, yes, it probably would give us some perverse pleasure to say 'Fuck you' to this decaying business model." In 2006, he called major record labels "stupid little boys' games – especially really high up".

Radiohead independently released their 2007 album In Rainbows as a download for which listeners could choose their price. Yorke said the "most exciting" part of the release was the removal of the barrier between artist and audience. However, in 2013, Yorke told the Guardian he feared the release had instead played into the hands of content providers such as Apple and Google: "They have to keep commodifying things to keep the share price up, but in doing so they have made all content, including music and newspapers, worthless, in order to make their billions. And this is what we want?" In 2015, he criticised YouTube for "seizing control" of contributor content, likening it to Nazis looting art during World War II.

Yorke released his second solo album, Tomorrow's Modern Boxes (2014), via BitTorrent. He and Godrich expressed their hope to "hand some control of internet back to people who are creating the work ... bypassing the self-elected gatekeepers". Asked if the release had been a success, Yorke said: "No, not exactly ... I wanted to show that, in theory, today one could follow the entire chain of record production, from start to finish, on his own. But in practice it is very different. We cannot be burdened with all of the responsibilities of the record label." In 2016, Yorke said he had tired of surprise releases: "No more fuss, just put it out. It takes away from things a bit, and it's sometimes frustrating. The energy of trying to do it differently and circumvent the monsters, you're like... whatever."

In a speech at the Ivor Novello Awards in May 2026, Yorke accused the industry of failing to support new acts and allow them time to develop creatively. He criticised the "financial frenzy" around share prices and back catalogue sales, which he said created an "insane flow of money upwards that leaves nothing but dust for new artists".

==== Spotify ====
In 2013, Yorke and Godrich made statements criticising the music streaming service Spotify, and removed Atoms for Peace and Yorke's solo music from the service. In a series of tweets, Yorke wrote: "Make no mistake, new artists you discover on Spotify will not get paid. Meanwhile, shareholders will shortly be rolling in it ... New artists get paid fuck-all with this model." Yorke called Spotify "the last gasp of the old industry", accusing it of only benefiting major record labels with large back catalogues, and encouraged artists to build their own "direct connections" with audiences instead.

Brian Message, a partner at Radiohead's management company, disagreed with Yorke, noting that Spotify pays 70 percent of its revenue back to the music industry. He said that "Thom's issue was that the pipe has become so jammed ... We encourage all of our artists to take a long-term approach ... Plan for the long term, understand that it's a tough game." Yorke and Atoms for Peace's music was readded to Spotify in December 2017.

=== Climate ===
In 2000, during the recording of Kid A, Yorke became "obsessed" with the Worldwatch Institute website, "which was full of scary statistics about icecaps melting and weather patterns changing". He said he became involved in the movement to halt climate change after having children and "waking up every night just terrified".

In 2003, Yorke became a spokesperson for the environmental organisation Friends of the Earth and their Big Ask campaign. He said this was a difficult decision, as it would expose him to personal attacks, and that journalists had harassed his friends and family for personal details. In an article for the Guardian, Yorke wrote that he initially felt he would be a poor match as his touring consumed a large amount of energy. However, Friends of the Earth persuaded him that this was ideal as they did not want to "present a holier-than-thou message". He accepted that he would be criticised for his support.

In 2006, Yorke and Jonny Greenwood performed at the Big Ask Live, a 2006 benefit concert to persuade the British government to enact a new law on climate change. That year, Yorke refused an invitation from Friends of the Earth to meet the prime minister, Tony Blair. Yorke said Blair had "no environmental credentials" and that his spin doctors would manipulate the meeting. He told the Guardian that Blair's advisers had wanted to vet him and that Friends of the Earth would lose access if he said "the wrong thing", which he equated to blackmail. Yorke also found it unacceptable to be photographed with Blair because of his involvement in the Iraq War.

In 2008, Radiohead commissioned a study to reduce the carbon expended on tour. Based on the findings, they chose to play at venues supported by public transport, made deals with trucking companies to reduce emissions, used new low-energy LED lighting and encouraged festivals to offer reusable plastics. That year, Yorke guest-edited a special climate change edition of Observer Magazine and wrote: "Unlike pessimists such as James Lovelock, I don't believe we are all doomed ... You should never give up hope."

In 2009, Yorke performed via Skype at the premier of the environmentalist documentary The Age of Stupid, and gained access to the COP 15 climate change talks in Copenhagen by posing as a journalist. In 2010, he performed a benefit concert at the Cambridge Corn Exchange for the British Green Party and supported the 10:10 campaign for climate change mitigation. The following year, he joined the maiden voyage of Rainbow Warrior III, a yacht used by Greenpeace to monitor damage to the environment.

Yorke endorsed the Green Party candidate Caroline Lucas at the 2015 UK general election. That December, he performed at the United Nations Climate Change Conference in Paris at a benefit concert in aid of 350.org, an environmental organisation raising awareness about climate change. His performance was included on the live album Pathway to Paris, released in July 2016. Yorke contributed an electronic track, "Hands Off the Antarctic", to a 2018 Greenpeace campaign. In August 2026, Yorke, O'Brien and Selway were among 211 artists to sign a letter calling for the prime minister, Andy Burnham, to reject proposals for further drilling in the Rosebank oil and gas field.

=== Trade and finance ===
In 1999, Yorke travelled to the G8 summit to support the Jubilee 2000 movement calling for cancellation of third-world debt. In a 2003 Guardian article criticising the World Trade Organization, he wrote: "The west is creating an extremely dangerous economic, environmental and humanitarian time bomb. We are living beyond our means." In 2004, Yorke was photographed having chocolate poured over him as part of the Make Trade Fair campaign to raise awareness about dumping commodities. In 2005, he performed at an all-night vigil for the Trade Justice Movement, calling for a better trade deal for poor countries.

The music video for the 2007 Radiohead song "All I Need" was produced with MTV EXIT, an initiative to raise awareness of human trafficking and modern slavery. Yorke said he saw slavery as a "political stability issue", and that it was important for people in the west to "understand the consequences of our economic activity". In 2011, alongside Robert Del Naja of Massive Attack and Tim Goldsworthy of Unkle, Yorke played a secret DJ set for a group of Occupy activists in the abandoned offices of the investment bank UBS. In 2015, Yorke released a statement accusing the British government of "siphoning money through our tax havens for the global super rich, while now preaching that we the people must pay our taxes and suffer austerity".

=== Israel ===
In April 2017, more than 50 prominent figures, including the musicians Roger Waters and Thurston Moore, the rights activist Desmond Tutu and the filmmaker Ken Loach, signed a petition urging Radiohead to cancel a performance in Tel Aviv as part of Boycott, Divestment and Sanctions, a cultural boycott of Israel. A week before the Tel Aviv performance, a Radiohead concert in Glasgow was attended by pro-Palestine protestors waving flags and signs. Yorke responded with anger on stage.

In a Rolling Stone interview, Yorke said of the criticism: "I just can't understand why going to play a rock show or going to lecture at a university [is a problem to them] ... It's really upsetting that artists I respect think we are not capable of making a moral decision ourselves after all these years. They talk down to us and I just find it mind-boggling that they think they have the right to do that." Yorke said that the petitioners had not contacted him. This was disputed by Waters, who wrote in an open letter in Rolling Stone that he had attempted to contact Yorke several times. In a statement, Yorke responded: "We don't endorse Netanyahu any more than Trump, but we still play in America. Playing in a country isn't the same as endorsing the government. Music, art and academia is about crossing borders not building them, about open minds not closed ones, about shared humanity, dialogue and freedom of expression."

At a solo concert in Melbourne in October 2024, Yorke was heckled by a pro-Palestinian protester for his lack of condemnation for Israel's attacks on Gaza. Yorke challenged him to make a statement onstage and left the stage when he continued to heckle. He returned to perform the final song, "Karma Police". Yorke wrote later that it "didn't really seem like the best moment to discuss the unfolding humanitarian catastrophe in Gaza".

In May 2025, Yorke released a statement condemning the Israeli government and Hamas's attacks in October 2023. He wrote that he was "in shock that my supposed silence was somehow being taken as complicity" and that he did not support "any form of extremism or dehumanisation". He also condemned the calls for artists to release statements on the subject, saying it was "a dangerous illusion to believe reposting or one or two-line messages are meaningful, especially if it is to condemn your fellow human beings". The American comedian and musician Reggie Watts criticised Yorke's statement, writing that it "centres his hurt feelings and frames his fans' demands for him to speak up as a 'social media witch hunt'", and hoped that Yorke would "reflect and decentre himself" from public outcry against the Gaza genocide. Pitchfork wrote that Yorke's response could be read as either "surprisingly supportive of Palestine" or "disappointingly mealymouthed", and that it satisfied no one.

In October 2025, Yorke said he would not perform in Israel again and "wouldn't want to be 5,000 miles anywhere near the Netanyahu regime". In 2026, Yorke said he "totally agreed" with the anti-Israel protests.

=== Other issues ===
In September 2004, Yorke was a key speaker at a Campaign for Nuclear Disarmament rally outside the RAF Fylingdales air base in Yorkshire, protesting Blair's support of the Bush administration's plans for the "Star Wars" missile defence system. Yorke and musicians including Plan B, Bryan Ferry and Mark Ronson appeared in the music video for the 2010 charity single "2 Minute Silence", which comprises two minutes of silence. The single commemorates Remembrance Day, with all proceeds to the Royal British Legion.

To celebrate the 2008 election of the US president Barack Obama, Yorke released a remixed version of his single "Harrowdown Hill" as a free download. In June 2016, following the Orlando nightclub shooting in Florida, Yorke was one of nearly 200 music industry figures to sign an open letter published in Billboard urging the United States Congress to impose stricter gun control.

After the election of Donald Trump in 2016, Yorke tweeted lyrics from Radiohead's single "Burn the Witch", interpreted as a criticism of Trump's policies. He opposed Brexit, and in March 2019 joined the People's Vote march calling for a second referendum. In 2024, Yorke was one of 10,500 creative professionals who signed a statement warning against the unlicensed use of copyrighted work in AI training.

Yorke is a vegetarian. In a 2005 film for the animal rights foundation Animal Aid, he said: "Society deems it necessary to create this level of suffering in order for [people] to eat food that they don't need ... You should at least be aware of what you're doing rather than assuming that that's your right as a human being to do it."

== Personal life ==
For 23 years, Yorke was in a relationship with the artist and lecturer Rachel Owen, whom he met while studying at the University of Exeter. In 2012, Rolling Stone reported that Owen and Yorke were unmarried. However, The Times later found that they had married in a secret ceremony in Oxfordshire in May 2003. Their son, Noah, was born in 2001, and their daughter, Agnes, in 2004.

In August 2015, Yorke and Owen announced that they had separated amicably. Owen died from cancer on 18 December 2016, aged 48. In September 2020, Yorke married the Italian actress Dajana Roncione in Bagheria, Sicily. Roncione appears in the video for the Radiohead song "Lift" and the Anima film. They live in Oxford.

On Yorke's 2018 soundtrack album Suspiria, his son, Noah, played drums on two tracks and his daughter, Agnes, collaborated on the artwork. Agnes appears in the video for the 2017 Radiohead song "Lift". In September 2021, Noah released a song, "Trying Too Hard (Lullaby)". NME likened its "ghostly" arrangement to Radiohead's album In Rainbows. Noah has since released several more songs, and performs with James Knott as the noise duo Hex Girlfriend. Yorke's younger brother and only sibling, Andy, is the singer of the band Unbelievable Truth.

Yorke practises meditation. In 2004, he said he had "dabbled" in Buddhism. He has suffered from anxiety and depression, which he treats with exercise, yoga and reading. While recording in California with Atoms for Peace, Yorke took up surfing, which he said taught him patience in creativity. In 2023, an extinct stingray species was named Dasyomyliobatis thomyorkei in his honour.

== Awards and nominations ==
Award	Year	Work	Category	Result	Ref.
A2IM Libera Awards	2020	Himself	Marketing Genius	Nominated	
A2IM Libera Awards	2020	Anima	Best Dance/Electronic Album	Nominated	
Brit Awards	2007	Himself	British Male Solo Artist	Nominated	
Chicago Film Critics Association Award	2018	Suspiria	Best Original Score	Nominated	
David di Donatello	2020	Suspiria	Best Score	Nominated	
Denmark GAFFA Awards	1998	Himself	Best Foreign Songwriter	Nominated	
Denmark GAFFA Awards	2001	Himself	Best Foreign Male Act	Nominated	
Denmark GAFFA Awards	2004	Himself	Best Foreign Male Act	Nominated	
Denmark GAFFA Awards	2006	Himself	Best Foreign Male Act	Nominated	
Denmark GAFFA Awards	2006	The Eraser	Best Foreign Album	Nominated	
Grammy Awards	2007	The Eraser	Best Alternative Music Album	Nominated	
Grammy Awards	2020	Anima	Best Alternative Music Album	Nominated	
Grammy Awards	2020	Anima	Best Boxed or Special Limited Edition Package	Nominated	
Grammy Awards	2020	Anima	Best Music Film	Nominated	
Grammy Awards	2020	"Suspirium"	Best Song Written for Visual Media	Nominated	
Libera Awards	2020	Anima	Best Dance/Electronic Record	Nominated	
Libera Awards	2020	Anima	Marketing Genius	Nominated	
Mercury Prize	2006	The Eraser	Album of the Year	Nominated	
NME Awards	2008	Himself	Hero of the Year	Nominated	
Washington D.C. Area Film Critics Association	2018	Suspiria	Best Score	Nominated	
UK Music Video Awards	2019	Anima	Best Special Video Project	Nominated	
UK Music Video Awards	2019	Anima	Best Production Design in a Video	Nominated	
UK Music Video Awards	2019	Anima	Best Choreography in a Video	Won	
UK Music Video Awards	2020	"Last I Heard (...He Was Circling the Drain)"	Best Alternative Video - UK	Nominated	
Žebřík Music Awards	2000	Himself	Best International Male	Nominated	
Žebřík Music Awards	2001	Himself	Best International Male	Nominated	
Žebřík Music Awards	2003	Himself	Best International Male	Nominated	
Žebřík Music Awards	2005	Himself	Best International Male	Nominated	

== Solo discography ==
=== Studio albums ===
- The Eraser (2006)
- Tomorrow's Modern Boxes (2014)
- Anima (2019)

=== Collaborative albums ===
- Tall Tales (2025; with Mark Pritchard)

=== Film soundtracks ===
- When the Dragon Swallowed the Sun (2010; additional music only)
- The UK Gold (2013; with Robert Del Naja)
- Why Can't We Get Along (2018; Rag & Bone short film)
- Time of Day (2018; Rag & Bone short film)
- Suspiria (2018)
- Confidenza (2024)

=== Albums produced ===
- Suspiria (2018)
- Sus Dog by Clark (2023; executive produced)

== See also ==
- List of Old Abingdonians
- List of British Grammy winners and nominees
