= FeelingPulledApartByHorses / TheHollowEarth =

2009 single by Thom Yorke

"FeelingPulledApartByHorses" / "TheHollowEarth"

Single by Thom Yorke
- Released: 21 September 2009
- Recorded: August 2009
- Genre: Electronic
- Length: 10:48
- Label: Xurbia Xendless; XL Recordings
- Songwriters: Thom Yorke; Jonny Greenwood
- Producer: Nigel Godrich

Thom Yorke singles chronology
"Analyse" (2006)	"FeelingPulledApartByHorses" / "TheHollowEarth" (2009)	"Ego" / "Mirror" (2011)

"FeelingPulledApartByHorses" and "TheHollowEarth" are songs by Thom Yorke, produced by Nigel Godrich. They were released as a limited double A-side vinyl in September 2009 and as a download on 6 October.

Yorke's band Radiohead first performed "FeelingPulledApartByHorses" in 2001. Yorke later performed it solo, and with his bands Atoms for Peace and the Smile. Yorke began work on "TheHollowEarth" during the sessions for his album The Eraser (2006).

== Writing and recording ==
Yorke's band Radiohead performed an early version of "FeelingPulledApartByHorses", then titled "Reckoner", in 2001. Yorke likened it to heavy metal. Pitchfork described it as a "droning rocker", and Rolling Stone said it featured "one of the loudest and most sinister riffs in Radiohead's catalog". In 2005, Yorke performed the song on acoustic guitar at a Trade Justice Movement show.

Working on "FeelingPulledApartByHorses" for their 2007 album In Rainbows, Radiohead added a coda that developed into a different song with the original title, "Reckoner". Afterwards, Yorke and the Radiohead guitarist Jonny Greenwood reworked the original song. They omitted the chorus and added bass guitar, "glitchy" drums, "disembodied" vocals, and an extended synthesiser coda. Rolling Stone described it as "more subdued and textural", in the style of Yorke's 2006 album The Eraser. Yorke described "TheHollowEarth" as a "bass menace" that began during the recording sessions for The Eraser.

== Release ==
The songs were released as a double A-side 12-inch single on 21 September 2009 and as a download on 6 October. Pitchfork described "FeelingPulledApartByHorses" as a "disorienting pleasure" and praised the "skilful production".

== Live performances ==
In 2009, Yorke formed a new band, Atoms for Peace, to perform his solo material. They performed "FeelingPulledApartByHorses" on their 2013 tour. Yorke and Greenwood performed "FeelingPulledApartByHorses" with their band the Smile on their 2022 tour. A performance was included on the 2023 Smile EP Europe: Live Recordings 2022.

== Track listing ==
No.	Title	Writer(s)	Length
1.	"FeelingPulledApartByHorses"	Thom Yorke, Jonny Greenwood	6:41
2.	"TheHollowEarth"	Thom Yorke	4:07
Total length:			10:48
