= The Eraser =

Studio album by Thom Yorke
- Released: 10 July 2006
- Recorded: 2004–2005
- Studios: The Hospital Club, London; Radiohead's studio, Oxfordshire
- Genre: Electronica
- Length: 41:02
- Label: XL
- Producer: Nigel Godrich

Thom Yorke chronology
The Eraser (2006)	The Eraser Rmxs (2008)

Singles from The Eraser
- 1. "Harrowdown Hill" Released: 21 August 2006; 2. "Analyse" Released: 6 November 2006

The Eraser is the debut solo album by the English musician Thom Yorke, released on 10 July 2006 through XL Recordings. It was produced by Nigel Godrich, the longtime producer for Yorke's band Radiohead.

Yorke wrote and recorded The Eraser during Radiohead's hiatus in 2004 and 2005. It began as instrumental electronic music created with computers, before Godrich encouraged him to develop it into songs. "Harrowdown Hill" concerns the death of the British weapons inspector David Kelly, and several songs reference climate change. The cover art, by Radiohead's longtime collaborator Stanley Donwood, was inspired by the legend of King Canute failing to command the ocean, which Yorke likened to government climate policies.

The Eraser debuted at number three on the UK Albums Chart and number two on the American Billboard 200. It was promoted with the singles "Harrowdown Hill", which reached No. 23 on the UK singles chart, and "Analyse". The Eraser received mainly positive reviews; critics praised Yorke's vocals and lyrics, but found it weaker than his work with Radiohead. It was named one of the best albums of 2006 by NME, Rolling Stone and The Observer, and was nominated for the 2006 Mercury Music Prize and the 2007 Grammy Award for Best Alternative Music Album. It is certified gold in the UK, Canada and Japan.

The Eraser was followed by a B-sides compilation EP, Spitting Feathers (2006), and a remix album, The Eraser Rmxs (2008). In 2009, to perform the Eraser material live, Yorke formed a new band, Atoms for Peace, with musicians including Godrich and the Red Hot Chili Peppers bassist Flea.

== Background ==
Yorke is the singer and lead songwriter of the band Radiohead. In 2004, after finishing the tour for their sixth album, Hail to the Thief (2003), Radiohead went on hiatus. As Radiohead had formed while the members were in school, Yorke said he was curious to try working alone for the first time. He dreaded telling his bandmates he had begun a solo project, but they supported him. The Radiohead guitarist Jonny Greenwood said: "He had to get this stuff out, and everyone was happy [for Yorke to make it] ... He'd go mad if every time he wrote a song it had to go through the Radiohead consensus."

== Recording ==
Yorke began recording The Eraser with Radiohead's producer, Nigel Godrich, in late 2004. Work continued throughout 2005 between Radiohead sessions. Recording took place in Radiohead's studio in Oxfordshire, Yorke's home and Godrich's studio at the Hospital Club, London. Godrich said that working with Yorke alone was more straightforward than with Radiohead, as he did not have to manage the relationship between Yorke and the other band members. On The Eraser, he and Yorke were able to "pull in the same direction".

The Eraser began as "intense" and "heavy" electronic music Yorke created on his laptop, much of which he created in hotel rooms during Radiohead tours. He felt it would not work with a live band, as "the sounds and ideas were not from that sort of vibe". Instead, he wanted to mainly use computers, but still have "life and energy" in the music.

Godrich encouraged Yorke to add vocals and make the music more accessible. He identified passages that could become songs, edited them and returned them to Yorke. For example, Yorke said "Black Swan" was a "nine-minute load of bollocks" until Godrich helped him edit it. Godrich is also credited for extra instrumentation. Godrich wanted Yorke's voice to be "dry and loud", without the reverb and other effects used on Radiohead records. Yorke found it difficult to write lyrics to loops, saying he could not "react spontaneously and differently every time", so he translated the parts to guitar and piano and generated new elements in the process.

To create "The Eraser", Yorke sampled piano chords played by Greenwood and edited them into a new order. "And it Rained All Night" contains a manipulated sample from the Hail to the Thief track "The Gloaming", and "Black Swan" samples a rhythm recorded by the Radiohead members Ed O'Brien and Philip Selway in 2000. Yorke said "Harrowdown Hill" had existed during the Hail to the Thief sessions, but could not have worked as a Radiohead song. Yorke said recording The Eraser restored his confidence and made him excited to create music again.

One song recorded in the Eraser sessions, "Last Flowers", was released on the bonus disc of Radiohead's next album, In Rainbows (2007). Another song, "The Hollow Earth", was finished later and released as a single in 2009. In 2005, Yorke appeared on the web series From the Basement, performing songs including the Eraser track "Analyse".

== Music and lyrics ==
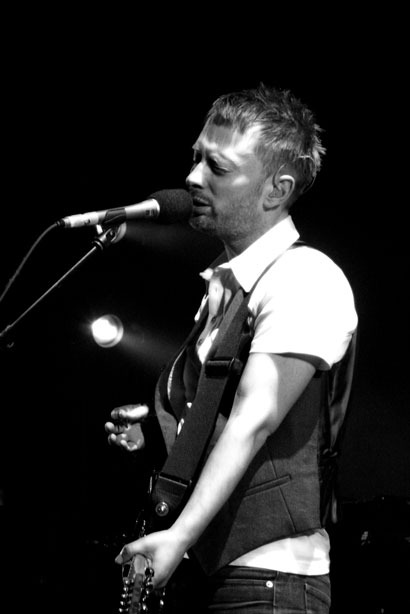
Yorke in 2006

According to the Guardian, The Eraser features "skittery" and "pattery" beats and "minimal post-rockisms". The Los Angeles Times wrote that it combined Yorke's laptop electronica with "soulful" political songs. Pitchfork described it as "glitchy, sour, feminine, brooding". Citing inspiration from the 1997 Björk album Homogenic, Yorke said The Eraser was designed to be heard in an "isolated space – on headphones, or stuck in traffic". In 2019, Uproxx said it was Yorke's "most straightforward" solo album, "the frontman of a famous rock band essentially presenting his latest tunes in the guise of a singer-songwriter record".

David Fricke of Rolling Stone felt the lyrics had an "emotional and pictorial directness" that was rare for Yorke. "And It Rained All Night" and "Cymbal Rush" address climate change and cataclysmic floods. The lines "No more going to the dark side with your flying saucer eyes / No more falling down a wormhole that I have to pull you out", from "Atoms for Peace", were inspired by an "admonition" from Yorke's partner, Rachel Owen. The song title references a 1953 speech by the American president Dwight D. Eisenhower.

According to The Globe and Mail, "The Clock", influenced by Arabic music, is a "gliding, droning song about losing control while pretending 'that you are still in charge'". "Analyse" was inspired by a power outage in Yorke's hometown of Oxford: "The houses were all dark, with candlelight in the windows, which is obviously how it would have been when they were built. It was beautiful." He said the album title addresses the "elephants in the room" that "people are desperately trying to erase ... from public consciousness".

Yorke wrote "Harrowdown Hill" about David Kelly, a whistleblower who died after telling a reporter that the British government had falsely identified weapons of mass destruction in Iraq. Kelly's body was found in the Harrowdown Hill woods near Yorke's former school in Oxfordshire. According to The Globe and Mail, the song resembles a love song with a sense of "menace" and "grim political showdown". Yorke was uncomfortable about the subject matter and conscious of Kelly's grieving family, but felt that "not to write it would perhaps have been worse". He described it as the angriest song he had ever written.

== Artwork ==
Part of London Views, the album artwork created by Stanley Donwood.

The Eraser cover art was created by Stanley Donwood, who also creates Radiohead's artwork. The cover, a linocut titled London Views, depicts a figure standing before London destroyed by flood in imitation of King Canute failing to command the ocean. It was inspired by the 2004 Boscastle flood, and an article by the environmentalist Jonathan Porritt comparing the British government's attitude to climate change to the Canute legend.

Donwood said: "There was something about this immense torrent washing everything away and the futile figure holding back the wave (or failing to) that worked with the record, especially as we had both seen the flood, just when Thom was starting on the music." He also felt The Eraser was a "very English record", which fit the London imagery. The album is packaged as a large foldout containing the CD, as Donwood and Yorke wanted to avoid using plastic.

== Release ==
On 11 May 2006, Yorke posted a link to the Eraser website on the Radiohead website. Two days later, he wrote in a press release: "I have been itching to do something like this for ages. It was fun and quick to do ... Yes, it's a record! No, it's not a Radiohead record." He emphasised that Radiohead were not splitting up and that the album was made "with their blessing". Before the release, "Black Swan" was used in the closing credits of the film A Scanner Darkly.

The Eraser was released on 10 July 2006 in the UK by the independent label XL Recordings on CD and vinyl. Yorke said he chose XL because "it's very mellow. There's no corporate ethic. [Major labels are] stupid little boys' games – especially really high up." The album was also released on iTunes. It was leaked online a month before release; Yorke said he regretted not releasing it as a download beforehand. In July, Yorke promoted The Eraser on The Henry Rollins Show, performing "The Clock" and "Cymbal Rush" with Greenwood and Godrich.

The Eraser debuted at number three in the UK Albums Chart and stayed in the top 100 for ten weeks. In the United States, it debuted at number two on the Billboard 200, selling more than 90,000 copies in its first week. "Harrowdown Hill" was released as a single on 21 August, reaching number 23 on the UK singles chart, followed by "Analyse" on 6 November. The Eraser was followed by a compilation of B-sides, Spitting Feathers, and a 2008 album of remixes by various artists, The Eraser Rmxs.

In July 2009, Yorke performed solo at Latitude Festival, performing Eraser songs on acoustic instruments. He contacted Godrich with the idea of forming a band to perform The Eraser, reproducing the electronic beats with Latin percussion. They formed a new band, Atoms for Peace, with musicians including the Red Hot Chili Peppers bassist Flea. The band performed eight North American shows in 2010, and released an album, Amok, in 2013.

== Reception ==
Professional ratings
Aggregate scores
Source	Rating
Metacritic	76/100
Review scores
Source	Rating
AllMusic	4/5 stars
The A.V. Club	B+
Entertainment Weekly	B−
The Guardian	3/5 stars
MSN Music (Consumer Guide)	B−
Pitchfork	6.6/10
Q	4/5 stars
Rolling Stone	4/5 stars
Spin	3/5 stars
Uncut	4/5 stars

On the review aggregator site Metacritic, The Eraser has a score of 76/100, indicating "generally favourable reviews". In NME, Louis Patterson praised Yorke's vocals and wrote: "Some will mourn its lack of viscera; its coldness; its reluctance to rock. But it's yet another revealing glimpse into Yorke's cryptic inner-world, and one that has the courage not to hide its political message in code." Rob Sheffield of Rolling Stone said: "These aren't Radiohead songs, or demos for Radiohead songs. They're something different, something we haven't heard before ... It's intensely beautiful, yet it explores the kind of emotional turmoil that makes the angst of [Radiohead albums] sound like kid stuff."

David Fricke said "the most striking thing about The Eraser is the high, clear sound of Yorke's voice, virtually free of the milky reverb he favours on Radiohead records". PopMatters wrote: "The Eraser isn't a masterpiece, but it's much more than solo-project divergence. Yorke has stayed focused and created a tight album that draws on its predecessors without being held to or afraid of them." The Los Angeles Times critic Ann Powers found that "like all of Yorke's best work, [The Eraser] finds its strength in the spaces where words and music dissolve, only to form something new".

In The Guardian, Alexis Petridis wrote that The Eraser "offers a plethora of low-key delights", but "you can't help imagining what it might have sounded like if Yorke had turned it over to Radiohead". Another Guardian critic, Kitty Empire, wrote that Yorke had "a fluent and unexpectedly convincing way with a laptop, coaxing faux-analogue sonar bloops, crackles and snaps out of digital gear". She cited "The Clock", "And It Rained All Night" and "Atoms for Peace" as high points and called the album "a qualified success".

The Village Voice praised Yorke's vocals, but found that "without the hooks of his inspirations or [Radiohead's] density, the results offer pleasantries where they could provoke profound unpleasantries". Pitchfork wrote that The Eraser is "strikingly beautiful and thuddingly boring in maddeningly equal measure". Writing in MSN Music, Robert Christgau found the themes "overstated" and the music "tastefully decorated click-and-loop". In 2019, Uproxx named it Yorke's best solo album, saying it "comes closest to having the heft of an actual Radiohead album ... Many of these tracks are as memorable as anything that Radiohead put out at around the same time."

The Eraser was named the 15th-best album of 2006 by NME, the 30th by The Observer, and the 34th by Rolling Stone. It was nominated for the 2006 Mercury Prize and the 2007 Grammy Award for Best Alternative Music Album. It is certified gold in the UK, Canada and Japan.

== Track listing ==
All tracks are written by Thom Yorke.

No.	Title	Length
1.	"The Eraser"	4:55
2.	"Analyse"	4:02
3.	"The Clock"	4:13
4.	"Black Swan"	4:49
5.	"Skip Divided"	3:35
6.	"Atoms for Peace"	5:13
7.	"And It Rained All Night"	4:15
8.	"Harrowdown Hill"	4:38
9.	"Cymbal Rush"	5:15

== Personnel ==
Adapted from the album liner notes.

- Thom Yorke – music, arrangement
- Nigel Godrich – production, arrangement, extra instrumentation, mixing
- Stanley Donwood – print
- Jonny Greenwood – piano chords on "The Eraser"
- Graeme Stewart – engineering
- Darrell "MakeMyDay" Thorp – mixing assistance

== Charts ==
=== Weekly charts ===
Weekly chart performance for The Eraser
Chart (2006)	Peak position
Australian Albums (ARIA)	2
Austrian Albums (Ö3 Austria)	17
Belgian Albums (Ultratop Flanders)	3
Belgian Albums (Ultratop Wallonia)	5
Danish Albums (Hitlisten)	6
Dutch Albums (Album Top 100)	18
Finnish Albums (Suomen virallinen lista)	10
French Albums (SNEP)	6
German Albums (Offizielle Top 100)	11
Irish Albums (IRMA)	8
Italian Albums (FIMI)	5
New Zealand Albums (RMNZ)	12
Norwegian Albums (VG-lista)	10
Scottish Albums (Official Charts)	4
Spanish Albums (Promusicae)	23
Swedish Albums (Sverigetopplistan)	21
Swiss Albums (Schweizer Hitparade)	10
UK Albums (Official Charts)	3
UK Independent Albums (Official Charts)	1
US Billboard 200	2
US Independent Albums (Billboard)	1
US Top Rock Albums (Billboard)	1
US Indie Store Album Sales (Billboard)	1

=== Year-end charts ===
Year-end chart performance for The Eraser
Chart (2006)	Position6
UK Albums (OCC)	181

== Certifications and sales ==
Region	Certification	Certified units/sales
Canada (Music Canada)	Gold	50,000^{^}
Japan (RIAJ)	Gold	100,000^{^}
United Kingdom (BPI)	Gold	100,000^{^}
Summaries
Europe	—	250,000
^{^} Shipments figures based on certification alone.
