= Various (band) =

English dubstep/electronic music duo

- Also known as: Various (UK); Various Production
- Origin: London, United Kingdom
- Genres: Dubstep, grime, trip hop, folk, glitch, techno
- Years active: 2002–present
- Label: XL Recordings
- Members: Adam Phillips
- Past members: Ian Carter; Milanese
- Website: various.co.uk

Various, or Various Production, is an English dubstep/electronic music duo formed in 2002. The group blends samples, acoustic and electronic instrumentation, and singing from a revolving cast of vocalists. Its members, Adam and Ian, purposefully give very little information about the group or themselves, and tend to do little in the way of self-promotion. Nevertheless, the group began winning critical acclaim with its single releases in 2005 and 2006, with singers Rachel Thomas Davies and Nicola Kearey. Their full-length for XL, The World is Gone, arrived in July 2006. They have released a large number of vinyl EPs and 7" records, as well as digital exclusives for Rough Trade, iTunes, and Boomkat. They have released remixes of a large variety of artists (sometimes uncredited) such as Thom Yorke, Adele, Virus Syndicate, Dave Cloud, Cat Power, Emma Pollock and Ian Brown and participated with one track on the Vexille Movie Soundtrack.

In 2002, the group started their own record label, called Various Records or Various Production, where they began releasing their own material, usually on 7" or 12" vinyl, or later as mp3 releases. In 2009 the duo started another label, called "Misc", this time for selling artworks and other products.

The duo signed a publishing deal with the newly formed Fire Songs in November 2007, a division of eclectic London-based record label Fire Records. In early 2009 they released a new LP, an experimental collaboration with poet Gerry Mitchell called The Invisible Lodger and signed the first act to release on the Various Production label, Gold Panda.

At some point during or prior to 2012, Ian Carter left the duo. He formed folk group Stick in the Wheel with previous Various collaborators Nicola Kearey and Rachel Thomas Davies, and has released music under the pseudonym EAN.

== Discography ==
=== Album releases ===
- The World Is Gone (XL Recordings, 17 July 2006)
- Versus (Various Production, 7 July 2008)
- The Invisible Lodger (featuring Gerry Mitchell) (Fire Records, 23 February 2009)

=== Vinyl releases on the Various Production label ===
- European EP (12", 2002)
- "Cogmac"/"Queen Bee" (7", 2003)
- "What About Them"/"Too Lost In You" (12", 2004)
- "Turn it Up"/"No Win No Fee" (12", 2004)
- "I'm Really Hot"/"Where I Belong" (12", 2005)
- "Hater"/"Biker Walk" (7", 2005)
- "Foller"/"Home" (7", 2005)
- "Sir"/"In This" (7", 2005)
- "Today"/"Go Beat" (12", 2006)
- "Mr Clever"/"Lost (dub)" (12", 2006)
- "Bruk"/"Home (edit)" (7", 2006)
- "13" (12", 2006)
- "Phortune"/"Limbs" (7", 2007)
- Chief EP (12", 2007)
- Diver (12" EP, 2007)
- "Meskman"/"Wot You Say" (7", 2008)
- Various Production Remix EP (12", 2009)
- Keep Her Keen (12", 2009)
- Trycycle EP (12", 2009)
- "Learn Faster"/"Air" (10", 2012)
- "Moving On"/"Bolts (12", 2012)
