= Analyse (Thom Yorke song) =

Single by Thom Yorke

from the album The Eraser
- B-side: "A Rat's Nest", "Iluvya"
- Released: 30 October 2006
- Genre: Art rock, electronic
- Length: 4:05
- Label: XL Recordings
- Songwriter: Thom Yorke
- Producer: Nigel Godrich

Thom Yorke singles chronology
"Harrowdown Hill" (2006)	"Analyse" (2006)	"FeelingPulledApartByHorses" / "TheHollowEarth" (2009)

"Analyse" is a song by the English musician Thom Yorke from his debut solo album, The Eraser (2006). It was released on 30 October 2006, as a download and on 6 November as a limited edition 12" single in the United Kingdom.

== Writing ==
"Analyse" was inspired by a blackout in Yorke's hometown of Oxford. Yorke said:

I used to live in central Oxford, on one of those historical streets, with all these houses built in the 1860s. I came home one night and for some reason, the street had a power cut. The houses were all dark, with candlelight in the windows, which is obviously how it would have been when they were built. It was beautiful.

== Release ==
"Analyse" features in the closing credits of Christopher Nolan's 2006 film The Prestige. A remix was released by Various Production, which Yorke described on the Radiohead blog as "a deranged twist".

== Track listing ==
- 12" XLT252
1. "Analyse" – 4:05
2. "A Rat's Nest" – 3:35
3. "Iluvya" – 2:59
