= Harrowdown Hill =

2006 single by Thom Yorke

Single by Thom Yorke

from the album The Eraser
- B-side: "Jetstream", "The Drunkk Machine"
- Released: 21 August 2006
- Genre: Alternative rock, electronic
- Length: 4:38
- Label: XL
- Songwriter: Thom Yorke
- Producer: Nigel Godrich

Thom Yorke singles chronology
"Black Swan" (2006)	"Harrowdown Hill" (2006)	"Analyse" (2006)

"Harrowdown Hill" is a song by the English musician Thom Yorke, released on 21 August 2006 as the first single from his first solo album, The Eraser. Yorke wrote it about David Kelly, a British weapons expert who killed himself in 2003 after telling a reporter that the British government had falsely identified weapons of mass destruction in Iraq. "Harrowdown Hill" reached number 23 on the UK singles chart.

== Writing ==
"Harrowdown Hill" was released on Yorke's first solo album, The Eraser (2006), which he recorded while his band Radiohead were on hiatus. Yorke said it existed during the sessions for Radiohead's sixth album, Hail to the Thief (2003), but could not have worked as a Radiohead song.

According to The Globe and Mail, "Harrowdown Hill" resembles a love song with a sense of "menace" and "grim political showdown". The lyrics are about David Kelly, a British weapons expert who killed himself in 2003 after telling a reporter that the British government had falsely identified weapons of mass destruction in Iraq. Kelly's body was found in the woods of Harrowdown Hill, near Yorke's former school in Oxfordshire. The 1990 poll tax riots were also an inspiration. Yorke felt "Harrowdown Hill" was a "poetic" name that sounded like the site of a historic battle.

Yorke was uncomfortable about the subject matter and conscious of Kelly's grieving family, but felt that "not to write it would perhaps have been worse". He told The Globe and Mail: "The government and the Ministry of Defence were implicated in his death. They were directly responsible for outing him and that put him in a position of unbearable pressure that he couldn't deal with, and they knew they were doing it and what it would do to him." Yorke said "Harrowdown Hill" was the angriest song he had written.

== Music video ==
The "Harrowdown Hill" music video was directed by Chel White. It features stop-motion eagle animation by David Russo, time-lapse footage by Mark Eiffert and an early use of tilt–shift photography. It was released on 31 July 2006 and was first played on Channel 4. The video won the jury award for best music video at the 2006 South by Southwest festival.

== Release ==
"Harrowdown Hill" was released as a single on 21 August 2006, and reached number 23 in the UK singles chart. In 2008, to celebrate the election of US President Barack Obama, Yorke released a remixed version of "Harrowdown Hill" as a free download. The Los Angeles Times critic Ann Powers wrote that "'Harrowdown Hill' makes its point through startling sounds and shards of emotionally charged speech; it's as political as a private, even secret, moment can be. Its startling beauty is typical of The Eraser."

== Track listings ==
- Promo CD
1. "Harrowdown Hill" (Early Fade)
2. "Harrowdown Hill" (Full Length)
- 7" XLS238, limited to 5,000 copies
1. "Harrowdown Hill" - 4:38
2. "Jetstream" - 3:44
- CD XLS238CD, limited to 10,000 copies
1. "Harrowdown Hill" - 4:38
2. "The Drunkk Machine" - 4:07
3. "Harrowdown Hill" (extended mix) - 7:01
- 12" XLT238, limited to 3,000 copies
1. "Harrowdown Hill" (extended mix) - 7:01
2. "The Drunkk Machine" - 4:07
- 12" XLT238US
1. "Harrowdown Hill" (extended mix) - 7:01
2. "The Drunkk Machine" - 4:07
3. "Jetstream" - 3:44
