= Rachel Owen =

Welsh artist and academic (1968–2016)

- Owen in 2012
- Born: Rachel Mary Owen; 30 November 1968; Cardiff, Wales
- Died: 18 December 2016 (aged 48)
- Spouse: Thom Yorke (m. 2003; sep. 2015)
- Children: 2
- Website: rachel-owen.co.uk

Rachel Mary Owen (30 November 1968 – 18 December 2016) was a Welsh photographer, printmaker and lecturer on medieval Italian literature. She was married to the Radiohead singer, Thom Yorke; they announced their separation in 2015.

== Life and career ==
Owen was born in Cardiff, Wales. She received a Bachelor of Arts in Italian and fine art (painting), specialising in printmaking, from the University of Exeter. In the 1990s, she lived in Florence with two students and studied painting at the Accademia di Belle Arti of Florence, where she fell in love with Dante's work. In 2001, Owen received a PhD from the University of London, where her research was on the illustrations in manuscripts of Dante Alighieri's Divine Comedy.

Owen was a lecturer in Italian with a focus on medieval Italian literature, where she examined illustration and its reception in Divine Comedy. She taught art history and Dante studies for visiting students at the University of Oxford.

Owen was also a fine-art printmaker and a member of the Oxford Printmakers Co-operative. She mixed photography with printmaking and her work explored ideas of transformation using photographic screenprints. Her artwork was used on the cover of the 1993 Radiohead single "Pop Is Dead".

== Personal life ==
For 23 years, Owen was in a relationship with the Radiohead singer, Thom Yorke, whom she met while they were students at the University of Exeter. Their children were born in 2001 and 2004. Owen influenced the lyrics of Radiohead songs such as "Optimistic" and "I Might Be Wrong", and Yorke's solo song "Atoms for Peace".

In 2012, Rolling Stone reported that Owen and Yorke were unmarried. However, The Times later found that they had married in a secret ceremony in Oxfordshire in May 2003. In August 2015, the couple announced they had separated amicably "after 23 highly creative and happy years". Several critics believed the separation influenced the lyrics of Radiohead's 2016 album A Moon Shaped Pool.

== Death ==
Owen died of cancer on 18 December 2016 at the age of 48. She continued to teach Italian into her final months. Radiohead dedicated the 2017 OKNOTOK reissue of their 1997 album OK Computer to her memory.

== Works ==
=== Books ===
- Rachel Owen: Illustrations for Dante's 'Inferno'. Oxford: Bodleian Library, 2021. Edited by David Bowe. ISBN 978-1851245703.

=== Exhibitions ===
- 2015: Ballon Rouge Art, Thame, Oxfordshire, England, 7–15 November 2015

=== Papers ===
- Owen, Rachel Mary (2001). Illuminated Manuscripts of Dante's Commedia (1330–1490) in Their Cultural and Artistic Context (PhD). Royal Holloway, University of London. OCLC 556889838.
- Owen, Rachel; Calè, Luisa (2007). "The Image of Dante, Poet and Pilgrim". In Braida, Antonella (ed.). Dante on View: The Reception of Dante in the Visual and Performing Arts. London: Ashgate. pp. 83–94. ISBN 978-0-7546-5896-2. OCLC 83609616.
- Owen, Rachel (2001). Honess, Claire E. (ed.). "Dante's Reception by 14th- and 15th-century Illustrators of the Commedia" (PDF). Reading Medieval Studies. XXVII. Graduate Centre for Medieval Studies, University of Reading: 163–225. ISBN 978-0-704-91215-1. ISSN 0950-3129. OCLC 50612171.
