= Suspiria (2018 soundtrack) =

Film soundtrack by Thom Yorke

Soundtrack album by Thom Yorke
- Released: 26 October 2018
- Studios: Memory Has No Holes; AIR Lyndhurst
- Length: 80:15
- Label: XL
- Producers: Thom Yorke; Sam Petts-Davies

Thom Yorke chronology
Tomorrow's Modern Boxes (2014)	Suspiria (2018)	Anima (2019)

Singles from Suspiria
- 1. "Suspirium" Released: 4 September 2018; 2. "Has Ended" Released: 3 October 2018; 3. "Volk" Released: 10 October 2018; 4. "Open Again" Released: 17 October 2018; 5. "Unmade" Released: 25 October 2018

Suspiria (Music for the Luca Guadagnino Film) is the soundtrack for the 2018 horror film Suspiria, composed by the English musician Thom Yorke and produced by Yorke and Sam Petts-Davies. It was released on 26 October 2018 through XL Recordings.

Suspiria was Yorke's first feature film score, and incorporates instrumental tracks, interludes, and songs. "Suspirium" was nominated for Best Song Written for Visual Media at the 62nd Annual Grammy Awards.

== Background ==
Suspiria was Yorke's first feature film soundtrack. He declined an offer to score the 1999 film Fight Club as he was recovering from the stress of promoting the 1997 album OK Computer by his band Radiohead. He later wrote music for short films produced by the fashion label Rag & Bone and a 2015 production of the play Old Times by the Roundabout Theater Company. Yorke agreed to compose Suspiria after months of requests from the director, Luca Guadagnino.

== Writing ==
Suspiria was the first Yorke project since The Bends (1995) not produced by his longtime collaborator Nigel Godrich; instead, it was produced by Yorke and Sam Petts-Davies. Yorke decided it would be pointless to replicate or reference the soundtrack of the original Suspiria (1977) by Goblin. Instead, he cited inspiration from the 1982 Blade Runner soundtrack, musique concrète artists such as Pierre Henry, modern electronic artists such as James Holden, and music from the film's 1977 Berlin setting, including krautrock acts such as Faust and Can.

The soundtrack took about a year and a half to create. It features the London Contemporary Orchestra and Choir, which previously appeared on Radiohead's 2016 album A Moon Shaped Pool. Yorke's teenage son Noah played drums on "Has Ended" and "Volk". Much of the score was completed prior to the film shoot, which allowed Guadagnino to play it on set during filming.

Yorke wrote sketches on piano while reading the script and viewing rushes. He likened his approach to the film composer Ennio Morricone, whom Yorke felt structured melodies similarly to pop songs. He said: "There's a way of repeating in music that can hypnotise. I kept thinking to myself that it's a form of making spells. So when I was working in my studio I was making spells. I know it sounds really stupid, but that's how I was thinking about it." He said he enjoyed working for commission, which motivated him to explore musical ideas he otherwise would not have discovered.

Yorke did not write lyrics that followed the film narrative, but was conscious of the scenes the songs would be used in. He described the lyrics as political, influenced by discourse surrounding Brexit and the US president Donald Trump, which "got tied up with" scenes of marching soldiers in the film.

== Music ==
Suspiria comprises instrumental tracks, interludes, and songs, incorporating instruments such as piano, guitar, flute, drums, and modular synthesisers. "Suspirium" is a piano waltz with flute and sparse production. "Has Ended" is a "slow-creeping groove" with droning keyboards, a dub-like bassline, and time-stretched piano. "Volk" is a "tension-filled" instrumental with "buzzy" white noise and "cacophonic" rhythms. For "Choir of One", Yorke recorded himself singing microtonal harmonies.

== Promotion and release ==
The Suspiria soundtrack was released on 26 October 2018 by XL Records. It was preceded by five promotional singles: "Suspirium", "Has Ended", "Open Again", "Volk", and "Unmade". XL held free listening events in cities around the world in September; fans could enter a lottery by email. In October, Yorke performed three songs from the soundtrack for BBC 6 Music. A limited vinyl EP of additional tracks, Suspiria Limited Edition Unreleased Material, was released on 22 February 2019.

== Reception ==
Professional ratings
Aggregate scores
Source	Rating
Metacritic	82/100
Review scores
Source	Rating
AllMusic	3.5/5 stars
The A.V. Club	B+
Consequence of Sound	B
The Guardian	3/5 stars
The Independent	4/5 stars
Mojo	5/5 stars
Pitchfork	8.0/10
Q	4/5 stars
Rolling Stone	4/5 stars
Uncut	8/10

The Guardian said the Suspiria soundtrack "[belonged] in the background to ramp up the emotional cues, and as such is not as satisfying a home listening experience". The review praised the "raw" synthesiser sounds but found them "melodically basic", and found some tracks approached horror cliche. Rolling Stone praised the vocal tracks, describing them as "vintage Yorke, and they make you wish he'd written more of them for Suspiria." The review concluded: "It's an intriguing sideways swerve for Yorke, who's still finding new ways to unsettle and delight listeners after all these years as one of rock's greatest ever late-night spooks." "Suspirium" was shortlisted for the 2019 Academy Award for Best Original Song, though it did not earn a nomination at the 91st Academy Awards. It was also nominated for Best Song Written for Visual Media at the 62nd Annual Grammy Awards in 2020.

== Track listing ==
All tracks are written by Thom Yorke.

Disc one
No.	Title	Length
1.	"A Storm That Took Everything"	1:47
2.	"The Hooks"	3:18
3.	"Suspirium"	3:21
4.	"Belongings Thrown in a River"	1:27
5.	"Has Ended"	4:56
6.	"Klemperer Walks"	1:38
7.	"Open Again"	2:49
8.	"Sabbath Incantation"	3:06
9.	"The Inevitable Pull"	1:36
10.	"Olga's Destruction (Volk Tape)"	2:58
11.	"The Conjuring of Anke"	2:16
12.	"A Light Green"	1:48
13.	"Unmade"	4:27
14.	"The Jumps"	2:38
Total length:		38:05

Disc two
No.	Title	Length
1.	"Volk"	6:24
2.	"The Universe Is Indifferent"	4:48
3.	"The Balance of Things"	1:08
4.	"A Soft Hand Across Your Face"	0:44
5.	"Suspirium Finale"	7:03
6.	"A Choir of One"	14:01
7.	"Synthesizer Speaks"	0:58
8.	"The Room of Compartments"	1:14
9.	"An Audition"	0:34
10.	"Voiceless Terror"	2:30
11.	"The Epilogue"	2:46
Total length:		42:10

Suspiria Unreleased Material extended play tracklist
No.	Title	Length
1.	"Unmade Overtones"	1:29
2.	"Unused Spell"	0:50
3.	"A Conversation With Just Your Eyes"	5:16
4.	"The7th7h7th7thson"	1:07
5.	"Volk Spin Off v1"	2:23
6.	"Volk Spin Off v2"	0:53
7.	"Volk Spin Off v3"	1:46
Total length:		13:44

== Personnel ==
- Thom Yorke – words, music, arrangement, production, recording
- Sam Petts-Davies – production, recording, mixing, music editing
- Hugh Brunt – orchestration, conducting
- Noah Yorke – drums
- Tom Bailey – engineering (AIR Lyndhurst)
- Laurence Anslow – assistance (AIR Lyndhurst)
- Alex Ferguson – assistance (AIR Lyndhurst)
- Walter Fasano – music editing
- London Contemporary Orchestra and Choir – score performance
- Giulia Piersanti – hands and eyes used on front cover
- Stanley Donwood – design
- Doctor Tchock – design
- Agnes F – design

== Charts ==
Chart performance for Suspiria
Chart (2018)	Peak position
Australian Albums (ARIA)	65
Austrian Albums (Ö3 Austria)	30
Belgian Albums (Ultratop Flanders)	23
Belgian Albums (Ultratop Wallonia)	44
Canadian Albums (Billboard)	93
Dutch Albums (Album Top 100)	40
French Albums (SNEP)	109
German Albums (Offizielle Top 100)	55
Irish Albums (IRMA)	53
Italian Albums (FIMI)	20
Portuguese Albums (AFP)	33
Scottish Albums (Official Charts)	10
South Korean International Albums (Circle)	100
Spanish Albums (Promusicae)	26
Swiss Albums (Schweizer Hitparade)	28
UK Albums (Official Charts)	13
UK Independent Albums (Official Charts)	2
UK Soundtrack Albums (Official Charts)	4
US Billboard 200	79
US Independent Albums (Billboard)	2
US Soundtrack Albums (Billboard)	5
US Top Alternative Albums (Billboard)	6
