= Step by Step (Braxe + Falcon song) =

2022 single by Braxe + Falcon

Single by Braxe + Falcon featuring Panda Bear

from the EP Step by Step
- A-side: "Creative Source"
- Released: 29 March 2022
- Recorded: 2014; 2020
- Genre: French touch; yacht rock; soft rock
- Label: Domino; Smugglers Way
- Songwriters: Alain Quême; Stéphane Quême; Noah Lennox
- Producers: Alan Braxe; DJ Falcon

Braxe + Falcon singles chronology
"Step by Step" (2022)	"Elevation" (2022)

Music video
- "Step by Step" on YouTube

"Step by Step" is a song by the French touch duo Braxe + Falcon. Produced by Alan Braxe and DJ Falcon and featuring Animal Collective member Noah "Panda Bear" Lennox, it was released as a double A-side single with the duo's track "Creative Source" on 29 March 2022, and as part of the extended play of the same name released on 24 June that year.

The cousins Braxe and Falcon each released music on Thomas Bangalter's label Roulé in their early careers, though they were unaware of each other's work. After they discovered this, they began work on music demos together around the same time Falcon produced the Daft Punk track "Contact" (2013). These demos were left untouched for years until Peter Berard, the manager of Domino Recording Company's US label, encouraged the duo to finish them. "Step by Step" was the first of their demos to be completed, with Braxe and Falcon sending the song's instrumental track to Lennox, who completed his lyrics and vocal tracks for the song in 48 hours.

Critics praised "Step by Step" for Lennox's vocals and lyrics, Braxe and Falcon's production, and its message. The song appeared on several year-end best lists by numerous publications. A music video directed by Toru Tokikawa and starring skater Ginwoo Onodera was released on 25 August 2022. A remix by Axel Boman was released in January 2023, and Braxe + Falcon performed the song live for the first time with Lennox that July at Knockdown Center in Queens.

== Background and recording ==
The producers Alan Braxe and DJ Falcon, who are cousins, each worked on electronic music in the late 1990s and 2000s on Thomas Bangalter's label Roulé. Braxe released the single "Vertigo" (1997) and with Stardust, produced "Music Sounds Better with You" (1998); Falcon produced the extended play Hello My Name is DJ Falcon (1999) and created two tracks with Bangalter as Together, the namesake track in 2000 and "So Much Love to Give" in 2002. From then on, Falcon remained largely inactive with music production, taking up hobbies like surfing and DJing, while Braxe continued to produce music.

In 2013, Falcon co-produced the Daft Punk track "Contact", at which point he and Braxe began recording demos together. Prior to this, Braxe and Falcon had only met "maybe ten times at family parties", and had no knowledge of each other's careers in electronic music, something that brought them close, especially since they had each released their first music on the same label, Roulé. The demos they made together were left untouched for years until the two spoke with Domino Recording Company's US label manager Peter Berard around 2020, who convinced them to finish their work. Braxe said he and Falcon were lucky to have met Berard, feeling that the kind of song that "Step by Step" would become would be viewed as fitting for inclusion on a studio album and not an extended play, though unlike most labels Braxe said Berard did not care about releasing their music in the latter format.

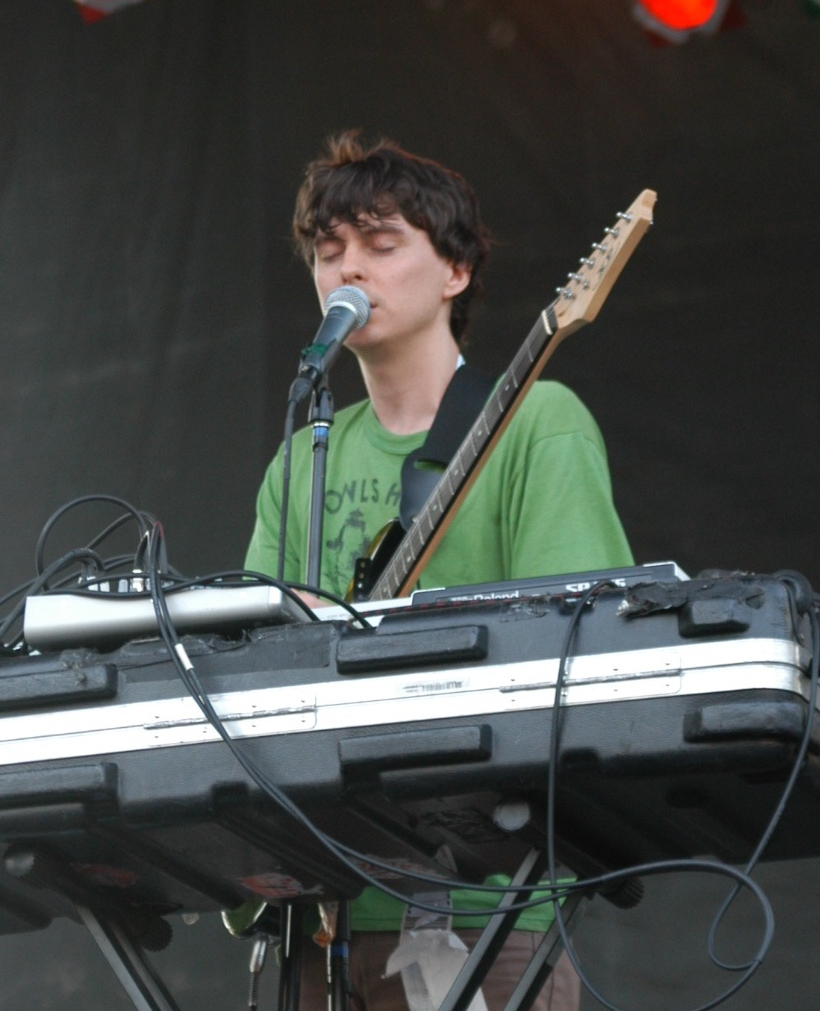
Noah "Panda Bear" Lennox contributed lyrics and vocals to "Step by Step".

"Step by Step" was the first of Braxe + Falcon's original demos to be completed, crucial to the duo since it was a "downtempo ballad" set to acoustic drums, a departure from the traditional French house 125 beats per minute format. Of the choice to diverge, Braxe said that since they had already produced that style of music, they were no longer interested in it. After the initial demos were recorded in Paris, the second recording and final mix were recorded at Braxe's studio in Toulouse, Haute-Garonne, with file and parts exchange from Falcon's studio in Biarritz, French Basque Country. As they began finishing their work during the COVID-19 pandemic, Braxe said their "whole state of mind" was altered, which allowed them to take time to "lay back" and focus on making music they liked, which ended up being divergent of typical club music.

The demo that became "Step by Step" was an instrumental, which they described as a "downtempo variation" of the club tracks released during the Roulé era. The song makes use of audio filtering, an element typical of French house music, and Braxe + Falcon used newer instruments such as modular synthesisers in the production, which they felt helped them "reconnect with the punk spirit of the early days" and released them from convention. Falcon favoured the use of modular synthesisers because they cause "happy accidents", and navigating this in the production process was something he considered satisfying and stimulating. Pitchfork editor Philip Sherburne said the duo's production was yacht rock and disco while being a return to French touch, and The Guardian wrote that the song was "wistful" soft rock.

"Step by Step"
"Step by Step" is a disco and soft rock song that uses modular synthesisers and features acoustic drums, with multi-tracked vocals by Panda Bear.

As they were working on the song, Braxe + Falcon decided to send the instrumental to Animal Collective co-founder Noah "Panda Bear" Lennox. The duo provided Lennox with references of his own material that they liked, but otherwise gave him creative freedom. Falcon believes it took Lennox 48 hours to send back his work on the track. Lennox came up with the title while he was cooking, and remarked the song is a reflection of how much he had been inspired by the duo's sampling work; he said the repetition of the title phrase in the verses, chorus, bridge, and coda reinforces it as a "hopeful mantra". The duo said that the repetition and loops were expressive of the song's content of melancholy and hope, an element of their music they said was continuous from their early work. The song was mastered by Chris Athens.

== Release and publicity ==
"Step by Step" was released as a double A-side single with "Creative Source" on 29 March 2022. It was digitally released as part of the duo's Step by Step extended play on 24 June, and in vinyl record format on 26 August on Domino Recording Company's Smugglers Way label. The music video for "Step by Step", released on 25 August 2022, was written, directed, and produced by Toru Tokikawa, and stars the then-12-year-old professional skateboarder Ginwoo Onodera. Filmed in Tokyo, the video features footage from Onodera practicing as a child, as well as footage of him winning awards and performing tricks. Tokikawa suggested the idea for the music video to show a child growing up and learning to skateboard, which the duo instantly accepted since they had skateboarded in their youth. Les Inrockuptibles observed that Onodera's performance was "delicate" for a "bright and catchy" track, feeling it aligned with the song's lyrics. Swedish DJ Axel Boman released a remix of the song in January 2023. Panda Bear and Braxe + Falcon debuted "Step by Step" live during a show at Knockdown Center in Queens, New York, on 21 July 2023. Falcon played the song at the Paris 2024 Paralympic Games closing ceremony during the Journey of the Wave set. On 28 June 2025, Youth Lagoon released a folk rock cover of "Step by Step" for SiriusXMU.

== Reception ==
Critics praised Braxe + Falcon's production. Pitchfork's Evan Minsker felt their production "glowed" and remarked that the synths were lively, praising the acoustic drums. Stereogum said the duo's work was futuristic and "breezy", calling it "a comforting reminder" of change's positive aspects, and to take things in "little pieces". Les Inrockuptibles's Franck Vergeade said the single was "highly addictive" upon a first listen, and compared it to the music of the band Phoenix. KCRW's Travis Holcombe said Braxe and Falcon's instrumental "emanates warmth and is almost like a slowed-down version" of the four-on-the-floor tracks that originally brought them acclaim. Another Pitchfork editor, Philip Sherburne said that the rest of the EP "pales in comparison", hailing it as "a languid yacht-rock-disco number" and praising its chord progression.

Critics considered Lennox's vocals and lyrics, along with his message, a highlight. Pitchfork's Minsker said Lennox gave the song a "narrative framework", hailing the musician's performance as his best of the year, saying that his multi-tracked vocals in "copious" repetition transformed "an old self-help chestnut into a life-changing belief system". KRCW's Holcombe said Lennox's talent with the melody and his optimistic lyrics were a perfect complement to the production, which created an "all-time great track". Pitchfork's Sherburne felt the song's best part was Lennox's, who "delivers one of his most stirring performances", praising the relatability of his part, which he found uncommon in most dance music.

The staff of KCRW listed "Step by Step" among the best songs of 2022, The Guardian ranked it 18th on their 20 best songs of 2022 list, whilst Pitchfork considered it to be one of the best electronic songs of that year. In August 2022, readers of Stereogum ranked the track at number six on the site's "2022 Song of the Summer" poll; at the end of the year, they ranked it at number seven on the site's list of the "Top 10 Songs of 2022" as part of the site's annual Gummy Awards readers' poll; on his ten-song contribution to Stereogum's "50 Favorite Songs of 2022" list, Stereogum staff writer Scott Lapatine ranked "Step by Step" at number three.

== Personnel ==
Credits adapted from the Step by Step extended play liner notes:

- Alan Braxe – songwriter, producer, mixing
- DJ Falcon – songwriter, producer, mixing
- Panda Bear – vocals, songwriter, lyrics
- Chris Athens – mastering
