= Braxe + Falcon =

French musical duo

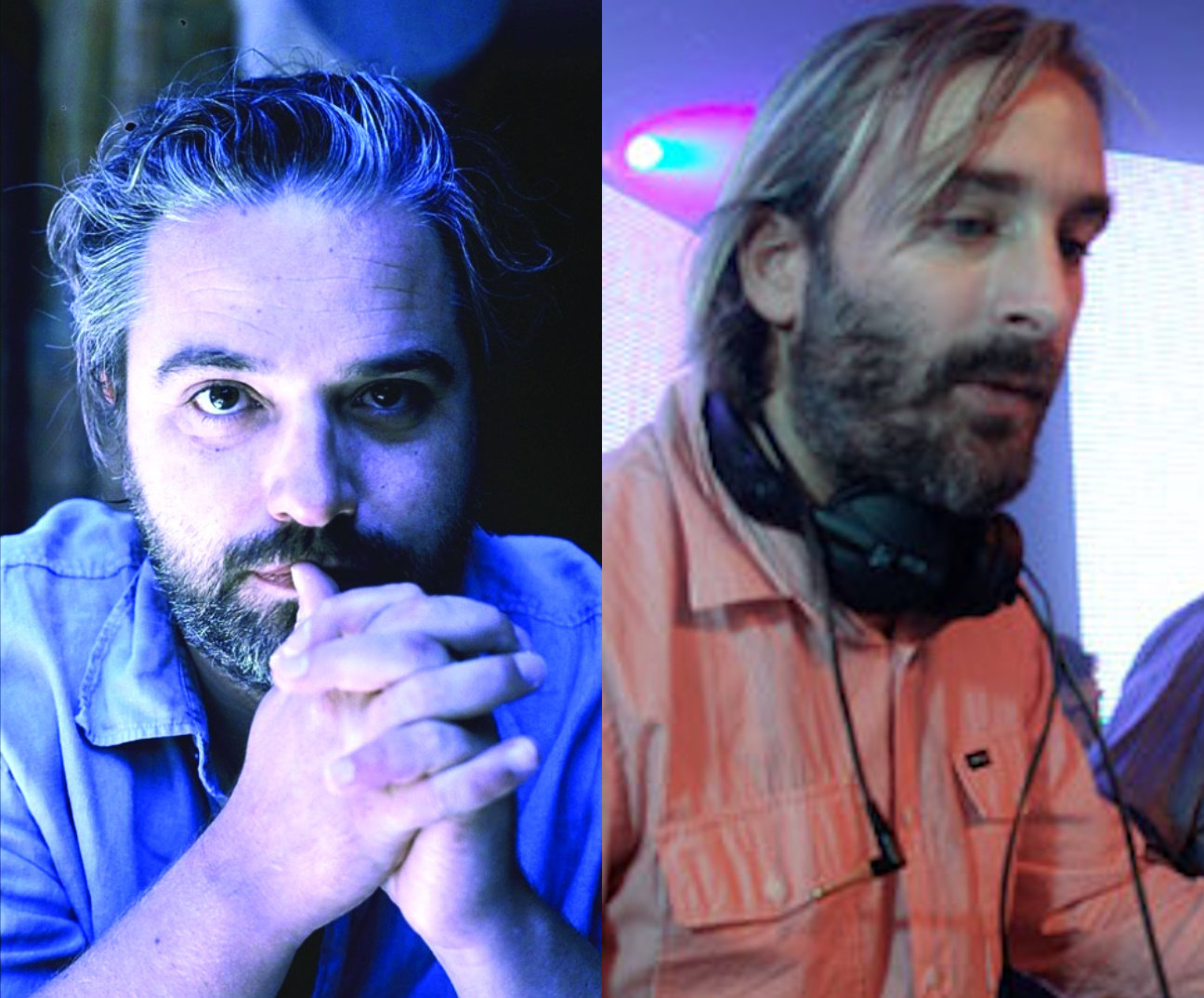
- Alan Braxe (left) in 2019 and DJ Falcon (right) in 2010

Background information
- Genre: French touch
- Years active: 2014; 2020–present
- Label: Smugglers Way
- Member of: UFOs (Note: UFOs are a supergroup consisting of Braxe + Falcon and the band Phoenix.)
- Members: Alan Braxe; DJ Falcon

Braxe + Falcon are a French touch music duo consisting of the cousins Alain and Stéphane Quême, known professionally as Alan Braxe and DJ Falcon. Each released music on Thomas Bangalter's label Roulé in the late 1990s and early 2000s, but were not aware of each other's music careers, having only sporadically met before at family gatherings. They started collaborating seriously in 2014, producing demos that they left untouched until 2020, when the Domino Records manager Peter Berard convinced them to finish their work. From this, they released in 2022 the tracks "Step by Step" with Panda Bear, "Creative Source", and "Elevation" with Sunni Colón, supporting that year's Step by Step EP.

Later, in 2023, they produced a remix of "Winter Solstice" for the band Phoenix and appeared at some of Panda Bear's shows with Sonic Boom. In 2024, they released the single "All This Love" with Bibio and performed as part of the closing ceremony for the Paris Paralympic Games. In 2025, they produced a remix of Justice's "Mannequin Love", and Braxe + Falcon formed the supergroup UFOs with Phoenix, releasing their debut single "UFO".

Braxe describes his use of musical equipment as minimalist, with Falcon being the opposite. Braxe describes himself and Falcon as "not real musicians" considering their lack of knowledge of conventional instruments like a keyboard instrument or guitar. The duo favour modular synthesisers for their ability to produce bass, play chords, sample waveforms or make drums, and what Braxe describes as the opportunity to form a "relationship" with the musical instruments. The duo use the Ableton Live and Digital Performer software when recording.

== Background ==
Both musicians had careers in music; in 1997, Alan Braxe released the single "Vertigo" (1997) and DJ Falcon released the EP Hello My Name Is DJ Falcon (1999), both on Thomas Bangalter's label Roulé. Braxe had a hit with Bangalter and the vocalist Benjamin Diamond as Stardust with the track "Music Sounds Better with You" (1998), and Falcon with Bangalter as Together, releasing the dance track "So Much Love to Give" (2002). Braxe continued releasing music throughout the 2000s with Fred Falke. Falcon co-produced the track "Contact" from Daft Punk's 2013 album Random Access Memories, but was otherwise musically inactive, taking up surfing, DJing, and photography. Around the time Falcon worked on the Daft Punk track, he and Braxe began to make music together.

Braxe and Falcon are cousins, but had only met at family parties and did not know of each other's production careers. They became close once they learned of their work in common. In 2014, the duo made several demos but nothing came of them. Around 2020, they spoke with the Domino Records manager Peter Berard, who convinced them to finish the demos. Falcon described his return to music production akin to having children, saying that his return had to be for the right reason, and that he would be able to look back satisfied on his work in the future. Falcon concluded that their choice to collaborate was made minding the goal of making "meaningful" material instead of "engaging in cultural pollution", doing so because of a love for making music.

== History ==
In March 2022, Braxe + Falcon released their first single, "Step by Step" / "Creative Source". "Creative Source" was described as disco house with slap bass and cut-up vocals. A remix of "Creative Source" by the Canadian DJ A-Trak was released in August 2022. "Step By Step" was made with Noah "Panda Bear" Lennox of Animal Collective. Braxe noticed the band's work was similar to his and Falcon's, and initiated a collaboration. Lennox described the title phrase as a "hopeful mantra" present throughout the song. In May, they released "Elevation", featuring Sunni Colón. On 24 June 2022, they released the EP Step by Step, and on 26 August they released vinyl pressings. That August, they released a music video for "Step by Step", written, directed, and produced by Toru Tokikawa and starring the Japanese skater Ginwoo Onodera. They announced two shows in November at Brooklyn's Elsewhere and El Rey Theatre in Los Angeles.

In January 2023, Swedish DJ Axel Boman released a remix of "Step by Step". In May, the band Phoenix released Braxe + Falcon's remix of their song "Winter Solstice". The band described it as the summary of their experience with the COVID-19 pandemic, and it was made since they had stayed in touch with Falcon during that time. Braxe described it as the result of Falcon's friendship with the band, and said the twelve-bar loop was "where it's easy to get lost in a very pleasant way", keeping the song downtempo to preserve Thomas Mars's voice. In July, they performed at three shows of Panda Bear and Sonic Boom's tour, at Paradise Rock Club, 9:30 Club, and Knockdown Center. In July 2024, they released "All This Love", featuring Bibio. Braxe had received a remix request from Warp Records for Bibio's "S.O.L.", and the two chatted until they decided to collaborate, with Braxe sending Bibio a demo produced by himself and Falcon. Bibio was familiar with the duo's work on Roulé, and worked with them on the track based on the theme of addiction. On 8 September 2024, the duo performed at the Paris 2024 Paralympic Games closing ceremony. They performed back-to-back with Pedro Winter at Portola Music Festival 2024, which took place on 28–29 September.

On 28 June 2025, a folk rock cover of "Step by Step" was released by Youth Lagoon for SiriusXMU. Braxe + Falcon's remix of Justice's "Mannequin Love" was released on 16 July on a remix EP including two other artists. The duo formed the supergroup UFOs with Phoenix, which released their debut single "UFO" on 23 September. It was released via Domino Records and Smugglers Way, with a limited edition 12" vinyl released at select independent record stores. Stereogum commented on the debut of the group that if this were just a one-off affair akin to Stardust with "Music Sounds Better with You", they felt "UFO" was a great song, feeling Mars's singing and the "percolating haze of keyboards" were lovely. Les Inrockuptibles wrote the supergroup's debut single mixed the dance style of Braxe + Falcon with the pop of Phoenix, creating a "definitive masterstroke". Warren Fu directed the music video, which features alien spaceships and vintage photos, including images of the members of Braxe + Falcon and Phoenix as children. The song featured on the soundtrack of the video game EA Sports FC 26.

== Artistry ==
"Modular [synthesisers] can be used for everything and that's interesting to us because the possibilities are endless within a closed world. You can create leads, bass, effects, play chords, sample waveforms or make drums, and you also put yourself in a situation where you can finally have a relationship with a specific instrument, just like a guitar player with his guitar."

— Alan Braxe on why he and DJ Falcon use modular synthesisers in their songs

Alan Braxe and DJ Falcon are considered influential to French touch and dance music as a whole. Describing the establishment of dance music in relation to their work together, Braxe described "the formula" for it as generally relying on technically-perfected production; the duo do not value this notion, instead they strive to place "sincerity" at the forefront of their artistry, which they described as creatively freeing. Pitchfork described their meticulous sampling techniques as time-consuming, more so than those of other quicker, less "judicious" producers. The duo's "painstaking" production style is due to them not having advanced technical prowess. Braxe describes himself and Falcon as "not real musicians" considering their lack of knowledge of conventional instruments like a keyboard instrument or guitar.

Braxe described his use of musical equipment as minimal, while Falcon was the opposite. Much of their work is achieved by modular synthesisers, a process described as satisfying and stimulating for its many usages and especially for its way to manipulate mistakes when used in tandem with a MIDI box or sampler. Braxe said they favour modular synthesisers for their ability to produce bass, play chords, sample waveforms, or make drums, and what Braxe describes as the opportunity to form a "relationship" with the musical instruments. Falcon usually uses the Eurorack and Cwejman modules, and works with the Electro-Music Assimil8or sampler. Braxe and Falcon both use the Strymon Magneto processing device on their music because of its delay, reverb, and pitch shifting effects. The duo usually try to begin with a modular synth loop or a few chords they came across spontaneously when composing music, with their production described by Pitchfork as setting up "optimal conditions for magic to strike". Typically, the duo use Ableton Live initially when recording, though once they compile all the parts in a song, they export the files to Digital Performer because of the favourable audio quality and easier editing ability.

== Selected discography ==
Singles
"Step by Step" (feat. Panda Bear) / "Creative Source" (2022)
"Elevation" (feat. Sunni Colón) (2022)
"All This Love" (feat. Bibio) (2024)
"UFO" (as UFOs with Phoenix) (2025)

EPs
Step by Step (2022)

Braxe + Falcon remixes
Phoenix – "Winter Solstice" (Braxe + Falcon remix) (2023)
Justice – "Mannequin Love" (Braxe + Falcon remix) (2025)

Other artists' remixes/versions
"Creative Source" (A-Trak remix) (2022)
"Step by Step" (Axel Boman's in the Air Version) (2023)
"Step by Step" (Youth Lagoon cover) (2025)
