= Dynamic Rockers =

Canadian electronic music group

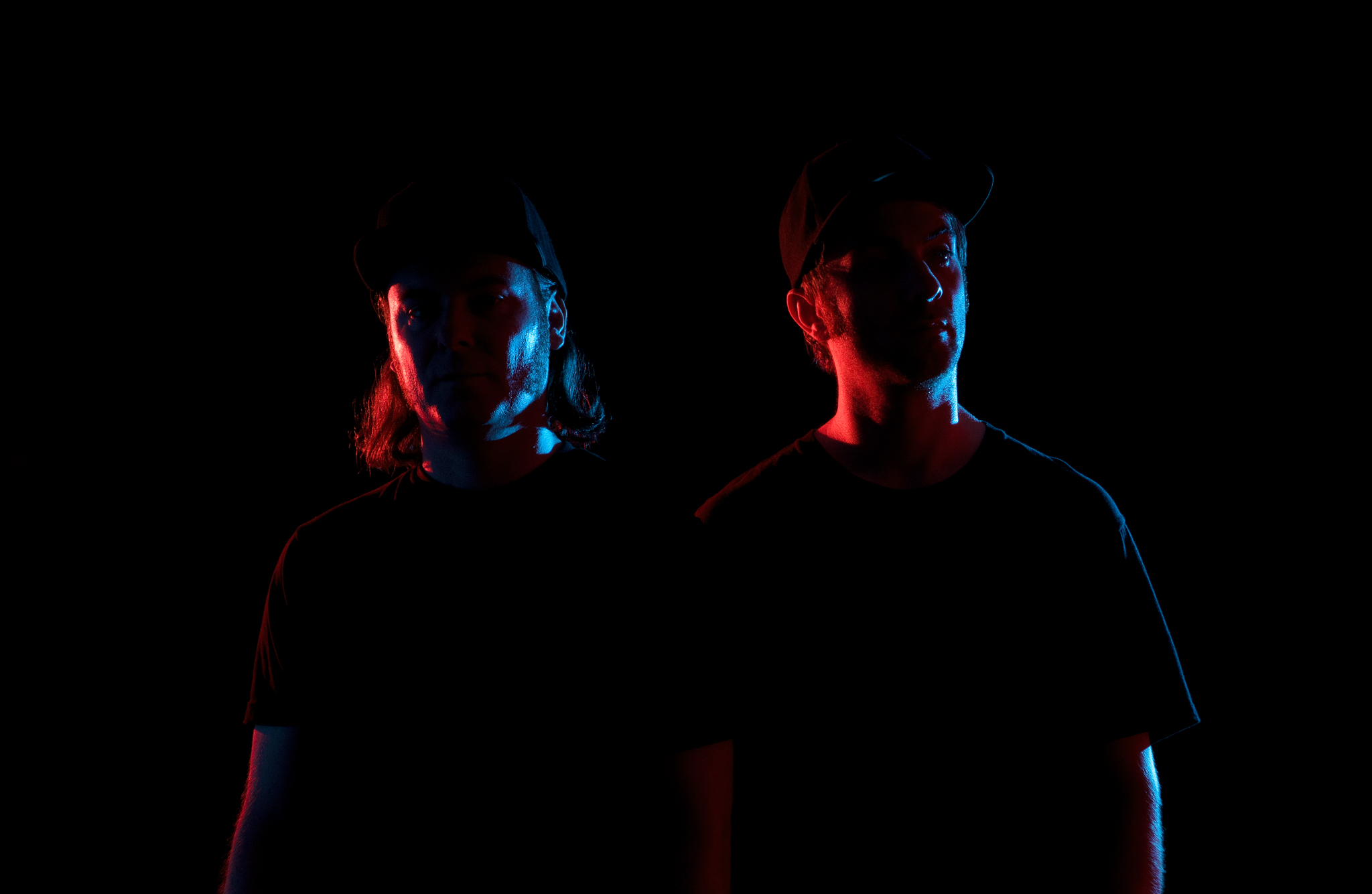
- Olivier and Damien Sellier

Background information
- Origin: Canada, Montreal; France, Paris
- Genres: Electronic; House; French house; Electro; Nu-disco
- Years active: 2004–present
- Labels: Dynamic Recordings; Stamina Recordings
- Members: Damien Sellier; Olivier Sellier
- Website: dynamic-rockers.com

Dynamic Rockers is a Franco-Canadian electronic music duo from Montreal formed in 2004 by two brothers, Olivier Sellier and Damien Sellier. Featuring a house music sound influenced by soul, funk and disco, the duo achieved significant popularity in the mid-2000s as part of the French touch house movement. They are also known for founding the labels Dynamic Recordings and Stamina Recordings.

== History ==
=== 2001–2004: Early career ===
Damien and Olivier Sellier start producing records under different monikers during their teenage years for VOX, a label based in Paris, side-label of Vertigo. Vertigo/Vox is known for releasing artists like Romain Tranchart of Modjo, Daft Punk's brother Play Paul or Vinyl Fever. First records by Dynamic Rockers members can be found under the name United Friends Of Funk for French house projects, or The Brazilian Studizel, which consists in blending bossa nova samples and Chicago house beats.

=== 2004–2005: French-Touch era ===
Freed from any contract with their former French Touch label VOX/Vertigo, Damien and Olivier Sellier launch their very own label Dynamic Recordings in June 2004. Since DJ Falcon (Roulé), Play Paul (Crydamoure), Daft Trax & Kitsuné manager Gildas Loaëc and Fred Falke (Vulture) support Dynamic Rockers first EP With Music, the release is originally mistaken by the audience and DJ stores for a side-project by some Daft crew members. The track With Music quickly makes an impact across house music forums, online blogs and leads to recognition via supports and airplays on Radio FG.

In the meantime, French artist Muttonheads' single To You is aired in heavy rotation on Radio FG. His label Serial Records decides to gather artists to make a special set of remixes. Muttonheads then contacts Dynamic Rockers after he had listened to With Music, to be part of the remixers for To You (Remixes).

October 2004, Dynamic Rockers come back with a new EP entitled Summertime once again supported and played on Radio FG. The Summertime EP also contains the title Brickster by German artist Manuel Tur. Endorsed by worldclass DJs like Sébastien Léger, Manuel Tur and his track Brickster appear on Techno pioneer Dave Clark's compilation World Service Vol. 2.

Dynamic Rockers go on to form their second label Stamina Recordings, on which they first release Tonight EP in November 2004. Annie Mac supports the song Tonight and plays it several times as a favourite and starter for her dance music show Annie Mac on BBC Radio 1. Tonight EP is shortly followed by the neighbouring EPs Mysterious Date, For Your Love and Thinking Of You, also endorsed by Radio FG.

March 2005, Dynamic Rockers release the third Stamina Recordings EP entitled Don't Be Surprised. The title Don't Be Surprised receives some support by Roger Sanchez who plays it three times in his weekly awarded radio show Release Yourself. Only one month later, in April 2005, Dynamic Rockers release Feel The Music. This song is once again supported by Roger Sanchez who plays Feel The Music for three months in his radio show but most of all plays it for the Release Yourself opening party at Pacha, Ibiza. Finally, Feel The Music catches the attention of the trendsetter Pete Tong who announces it as an essential in his Essential Mix on BBC Radio 1.

From there, Dynamic Rockers establish themselves in the scene thanks to their distinctive funky basslines à la Chic, Daft Punk or Alan Braxe and untraceable obscure disco samples, hallmark of the French touch sound.

=== 2006–2008: Electro-house era ===
In 2006, the house music trend evolves from a funky filtered sound to a more electronic and minimal flavour labelled electro house. After having released more than ten EP of nu-disco music, Dynamic Rockers expend new musical horizons in this direction, using more synth sounds as well. Dynamic Rockers refocus all their productions on Stamina Recordings.

The first EP of Dynamic Rockers' new sound is entitled Life released in March 2006. Life is once again played by international DJs like Roger Sanchez in his radio show.

June 2006, Dynamic Rockers release a new record containing Back To Basics and This Is My House. It's an electro house EP with an old-school House music twist, hence the title. Back To Basics is buzz-charted twice in the update section of the DMC Magazine and played by Judge Jules in his show on the electronic music authority BBC Radio 1. Inspired by the old-school house music revival, Dynamic Rockers produce a remix of the 1988 classic song The Party by Kraze for the German label Milk & Sugar.

Back To Basics is then followed by three other electro house EPs, Feedback, Back Again and Keep The Groove On. In September 2007, some of the best tracks of their electro house work are compiled on the record Dynamic Rockers EP for the German label Rotor Records, sub-label of Milk & Sugar.

In December 2007, Dynamic Rockers licence the electro house track I Know to Royal Flush Records. The song is actually a remix of a ballade previously recorded for their pop rock side project. The song is first released on the Pacha Club Ibiza 2007 compilation. Although Dynamic Rockers is not related in any way to the rising French Electro Dance phenomenon, French teens seize the song I Know as a background track of their revived Vogue dance routine internet-videos.

Early 2008 in Europe, the Electro Dance is hijacked by media, mainstream brands, major labels and event managers in a questionable manner. Dynamic Rockers, fans of street dance and actors of the underground culture, decide to restore to favour the phenomenon without the disputable glamrock makeup, flashy outfit and commercial aspect. They produce an official street video for I Know with two dance crews, Mafia Electro and Wantek both originators of the electro dance movement. On purpose, the video is shot at Palais de Tokyo, a famous spot used by skateboard videographers, to bring the electro Dance back to the streets. The music video showcases a friendly battle of the two dance crews, in a one-on-one breakdance style gathering. Reaching millions of views, the music video I Know instantly becomes viral on YouTube and dailymotion. French TV channel M6 licences it quickly after. In February 2008, I Know is officially released as a CD single peeking at the 26th position in the SNEP French Club 40 and 42nd position in the SNEP French TOP 100 single chart. The song is then released on vinyl record, and aired on TV channels such as Fun TV and M6. I Know also become the theme song for the Dance music TV show M6 Club for two years. I Know is compiled on major house music compilations including the annual FG DJ Radio Club Dance 2008.

=== 2008–2015: Break from the scene ===
While reaching a significant popularity with Dynamic Rockers, Damien and Olivier Sellier, respectively bass and guitar players, work on a side-project with the singer Dave Eastman with whom they released the song Time and Together in 2006. The band is called French Kiss and consists of a soul, funk and pop music act with up-and-coming Parisian jazz talents including the drummer Damien Schmitt, keyboard player Vincent Bidal and Maureen Angot. French Kiss LP entitled All Is Beginning is in production and still to be released. For a few years, Dynamic Rockers appear to take distance from the electronic music with the rise of mainstream dubstep and the EDM phenomenon which they are not connected to.

=== 2016–present ===
After several years of retreat and different musical projects, on 21 June 2016, Dynamic Rockers announce their musical comeback on their different social media profiles. They talk about the rebirth of their label Dynamic Recordings abbr. DYREC and their forthcoming projects.

== Discography ==
=== EPs ===
- 2004-06-14: With Music
- 2004-10-01: Summertime
- 2004-11-15: Tonight
- 2004-11-22: Mysterious Date
- 2005-01-03: For Your Love
- 2005-02-04: Thinking Of You
- 2005-03-14: Don't Be Surprised
- 2005-04-25: Feel The Music
- 2005-06-14: Good Times
- 2006-01-19: Time
- 2006-03-13: Life
- 2006-04-24: Together
- 2006-06-19: Back To Basics
- 2006-09-01: Feedback
- 2006-11-07: Back Again
- 2007-06-12: Keep The Groove On
- 2007-09-01: Dynamic Rockers EP

=== CD Singles ===
- 2008-03-22: I Know (M6 Music | Sony BMG) | Peak position 42 in the SNEP French TOP 100 single chart. Peak position 26 in the SNEP French Club 40.

=== Remixes ===
- 2004-09-13: Muttonheads - To You (Serial Records)
- 2004-11-08: Manuel Tur - In The Air (Stamina Recordings)
- 2005-07-18: Wize - Exhibition (Ledge Music)
- 2006-07-17: Kraze - The Party (Milk & Sugar Recordings)
- 2007-12-17: Paul Star - Freaks Come Out (Royal Flush Records)
- 2010-03-02: The Henchmen - La Colita (Starlight Music)

=== Videography ===
- 2008-02-18: I Know - Videoclip featuring Electro Dance crews Wantek and Mafia Electro directed by Dynamic Rockers and Gilles Guerraz.

=== Synchronization TV ===
- 2006: Canal+ +Clair, Background music (Dynamic Rockers - Life)
- 2008: M6 Hit Machine, Intermission theme (Dynamic Rockers - I Know)
- 2008–2009: M6 Club, Theme song (Dynamic Rockers - I Know)
