= Dynamic Recordings =

Canadian electronic music record label

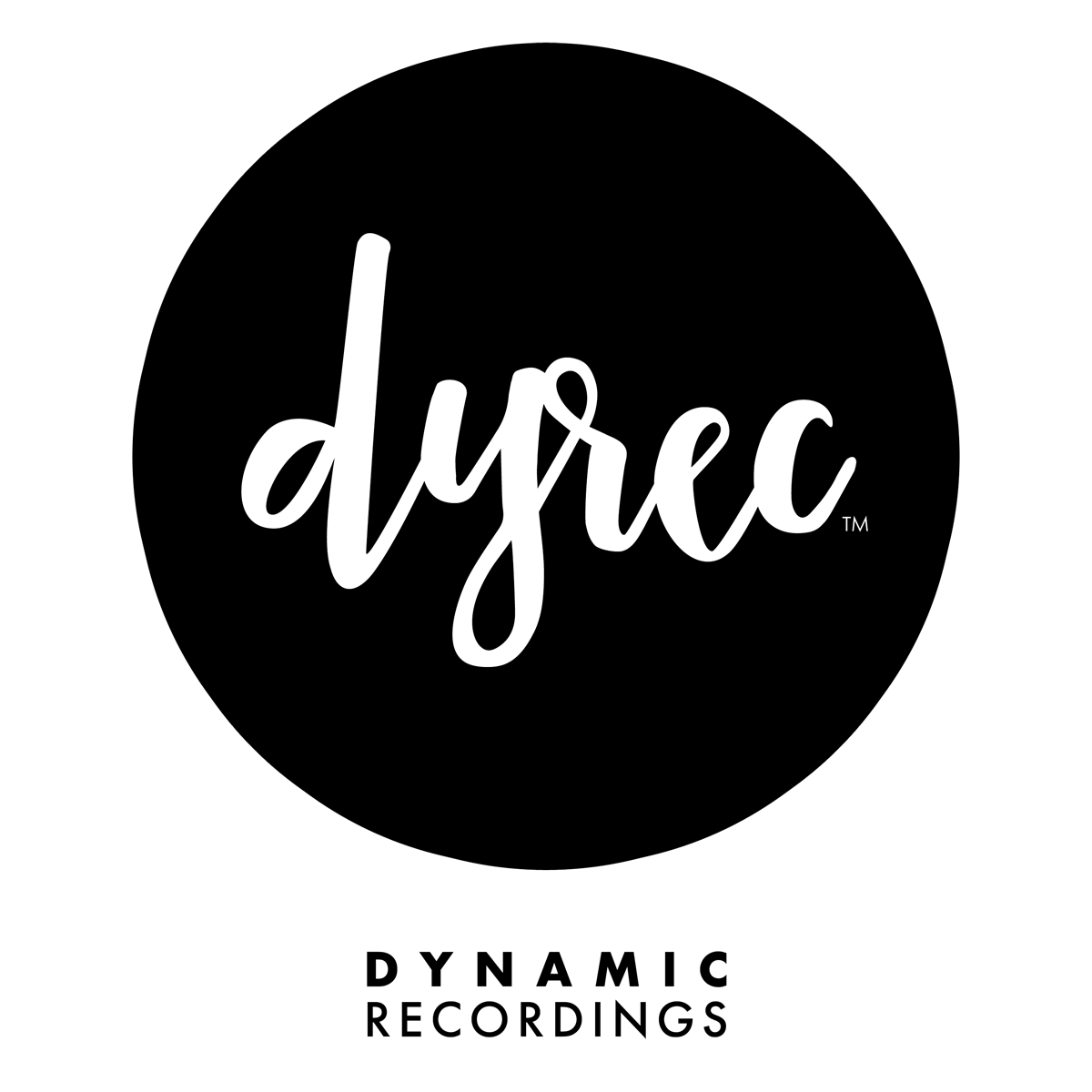
- Founded: 2004
- Founder: Damien Sellier; Olivier Sellier
- Status: Active
- Genre: Electronic; House; French house; Electro; nu-disco
- Country of origin: Canada
- Location: Montreal, Quebec
- Official website: dyrec.com

Dynamic Recordings is a Canadian electronic music record label based in Montreal founded in 2004 by two brothers, Olivier Sellier and Damien Sellier a.k.a. Dynamic Rockers. Mostly focused on a house music sound influenced by soul, funk and disco, the label achieved significant popularity in the mid-2000s as part of the French touch house movement. Dynamic Recordings also have a sublabel entitled Stamina Recordings.

== History ==
=== 2004-2005: Dynamic Recordings ===
Damien and Olivier Sellier a.k.a. Dynamic Rockers start producing records during their teenage years for VOX, a French touch label based in Paris, side-label of Vertigo. After six EPs under different monikers and genre, Dynamic Rockers brothers end their collaboration with VOX. Damien and Olivier Sellier decide to launch their very own label Dynamic Recordings in June 2004.

Since DJ Falcon (Roulé), Play Paul (Crydamoure), Daft Trax & Kitsuné manager Gildas Loaëc and Fred Falke (Vulture) support Dynamic Recordings first EP With Music, the release is originally mistaken by the audience and DJ stores for a side-project by some Daft crew members. The track With Music by Dynamic Rockers quickly leads to recognition via supports and airplays on Radio FG.

Dynamic Recordings second release entitled Summertime, a pure French house record, is also supported and played on Radio FG. The Summertime EP includes two tracks by Dynamic Rockers and the title Brickster by German artist Manuel Tur. Endorsed by worldclass DJs like Sébastien Léger, Manuel Tur and his track Brickster appear on Techno pioneer Dave Clark's compilation World Service Vol. 2.

Summertime is shortly followed by the neighbouring EPs Mysterious Date and Thinking Of You, also endorsed by Radio FG. Once set together, the four first releases on Dynamic Recordings make a 48" long futuristic Tokyo panorama in the colors of the label.

=== Stamina Recordings ===
==== 2004–2005: French-Touch era ====
In the meantime, November 2004, Dynamic Rockers set their second label Stamina Recordings. While Dynamic Recordings release only EPs with elaborated artworks complementing one another, Stamina Recordings is a playground for spontaneity and publish only maxi singles with a straightforward cover artwork and a reduced turnaround.

Stamina Recordings first release contains Tonight by Dynamic Rockers and In The Air by Manuel Tur. Annie Mac supports Tonight and plays it several times as a favourite and starter for her show Annie Mac on BBC Radio 1.

March 2005, Dynamic Rockers release the third Stamina Recordings maxi single entitled Don't Be Surprised. The title Don't Be Surprised receives some support by Roger Sanchez who plays it three times in his weekly awarded radio show Release Yourself.

Only one month later, in April 2005, Stamina Recordings release Feel The Music by Dynamic Rockers. The three track EP also contains Kartenfrust and Cobra Clouds both produced by Manuel Tur. Feel The Music is once again supported by Roger Sanchez who plays it for three months in his radio show but most of all plays it for the Release Yourself opening party at Pacha, Ibiza. Finally, Feel The Music catches the attention of the trendsetter Pete Tong who announces it as an essential in his Essential Mix on BBC Radio 1.

From there, Dynamic Recordings and Stamina Recordings establish themselves in the scene thanks to their distinctive sound reminiscent of artists such as Daft Punk and Alan Braxe, as well as the use of untraceable disco samples, which are characteristic of the French touch sound. Stamina Recordings would contribute to the second generation of French touch alongside the likes of Vulture Music, Diamondtraxx and Kitsuné.

==== 2006–2008: Electro-house era ====
In 2006, the house music trend evolves from a funky filtered sound to a more electronic flavour labelled electro house. After having released more than ten EP of nu-disco music, Dynamic Rockers expend new musical horizons in this direction, using more synth sounds as well. Dynamic Rockers then refocus all their productions on Stamina Recordings.

The first EP of Dynamic Rockers' new sound is entitled Life released in March 2006. Life contains a remix by Terry Johnson Jr and French artist Muttonheads. Life is once again played by international DJs like Roger Sanchez in his radio show.

June 2006, Stamina Recordings release a new record containing Back To Basics and This Is My House by Dynamic Rockers. It's an electro house EP with an old-school House music twist, hence the title. Back To Basics is buzz-charted twice in the update section of the DMC Magazine and played by Judge Jules in his show on the electronic music authority BBC Radio 1. Back To Basics is then followed by three other electro house EPs, Feedback, Back Again and Keep The Groove On.

Licensed on third party record companies, Dynamic Rockers put a hold on their in-house productions for Stamina Recordings in 2008.

=== 2016: Dynamic Recordings relaunch ===
After several years of retreat and different musical projects, 21 June 2016, Dynamic Rockers announce their musical comeback on their different social media profiles. They talk about the rebirth of their label Dynamic Recordings abbr. DYREC and their forthcoming projects.

== Discography ==
=== Dynamic Recordings ===
- 2004-06-14: Dynamic Rockers - With Music [DYREC01]
- 2004-10-01: Dynamic Rockers, Manuel Tur - Summertime [DYREC02]
- 2004-11-22: Dynamic Rockers, Terry Johnson Jr. - Mysterious Date [DYREC03]
- 2005-02-04: Dynamic Rockers - Thinking Of You [DYREC04]

=== Stamina Recordings ===
- 2004-11-15: Dynamic Rockers, Manuel Tur - Tonight [STAMINA01]
- 2005-01-03: Dynamic Rockers - For Your Love [STAMINA02]
- 2005-03-14: Dynamic Rockers - Don't Be Surprised [STAMINA03]
- 2005-04-25: Dynamic Rockers, Manuel Tur - Feel The Music [STAMINA04]
- 2005-06-14: Dynamic Rockers, Terry Johnson Jr. - Good Times [STAMINA05]
- 2006-03-13: Dynamic Rockers, Terry Johnson Jr., Muttonheads - Life [STAMINA06]
- 2006-06-19: Dynamic Rockers - Back To Basics [STAMINA07]
- 2006-09-01: Dynamic Rockers - Feedback [STAMINA08]
- 2006-11-07: Dynamic Rockers - Back Again [STAMINA09]
- 2007-06-12: Dynamic Rockers - Keep The Groove On [STAMINA10]
