= Sunni Colón =

American musician

- Also known as: Sunni Colón, Tetsu
- Born: Sunni Colón Thierry Tetsu; 1991 (age 34–35); Los Angeles, California, US
- Genres: Alternative R&B, Funk, Soul
- Occupations: Singer, Songwriter, Record Producer, Artist
- Instruments: Guitar, Piano
- Works: Albums, Singles
- Years active: 2013 – present
- Label: Tetsu Recordings

Sunni Colón Thierry Tetsu (born 1991) known by his stage name Sunni Colón is an American singer/songwriter, producer, and artist based in Los Angeles, California. He has released three albums and his music was featured in Dear White People and HBO’s Insecure and Ballers.

== Early life ==
Tetsu was born to Nigerian parents and grew up moving around the world, his mother a biochemist and his father a real estate professional. Sunni always had an affinity with music and began creating beats as early as 13 years old. He is a self-taught multi-instrumentalist.

Sunni attended California State University, Long Beach and graduated with a degree in civil engineering. He went on to work as a project manager at a design and construction company before quitting to create the creative agency, TETSU with a business partner.

Along with the new business venture, Sunni continued taking risks by establishing himself as a singer/songwriter and producer. A stark contrast to his family background coming from educators, business professionals, and engineers.

Tetsu made hip-hop beats for rappers and through his journey of sampling, he became enamored with the music he sampled and found himself learning and honing his craft from soul, funk, Neo-soul, rock and roll, and contemporary R&B.

== Career ==
Tetsu garnered recognition from his demo single, Temple released on SoundCloud in 2013. The single reached the attention of a Hollywood music supervisor, Paul Stewart and it became a part of the soundtrack for Justin Simien's film Dear White People.

His debut single, Water was released in 2015.

In 2016, he served as a co-writer and guitarist on Cinderella, a track for Mac Miller’s album, The Divine Feminine. Sunni released Little Things, a single produced by Kaytranada in 2017. Little Things was featured in HBO’s Insecure and Ballers.

Sunni debuted his first album, Thierry Disko in 2016. Thierry Disko a refreshing take on modern funk, alternative R&B, with hints of soul and rock & roll.

Following his album’s release, he had a multi-sensory art installation called Manifest 1.0. featured in East Williamsburg, New York City in 2017.

Tetsu retreated to Paris to focus on the creation of his next project, his second album Satin Psicodelic, released in 2018. The album cemented Sunni’s sonic signature, a melting pot of progressive funk, alt-R&B, soul, and flirtation with rock & roll and jazz. The three lead singles from the album are Summer Blu, Technicolor, and Baby I Don't Mind.

Sunni was featured in a few publications (Highsnobiety and The New York Times) and platforms (Colors Studio) following the release of his self-released album. He performed Mornin Dew, a track from Satin Psicodelic, on Colors Studio.

In 2019, Sunni signed with IMG Models and was featured in Tommy Hilfiger F/W 2019 campaign

From 2019 to 2020, Tetsu releases three singles: Supernova, Slip n Slide, and Penny for Your Thoughts.

Early 2022, Sunni debuts his album JúJú & The Flowerbug. The lead singles are Provide, Flowerbug (Interlude), and Supernatural Woman. JúJú & The Flowerbug stays true to Sunni’s signature sound of alternative R&B and funk plus incorporates Afrobeats and Samba.

As of 2024, Tetsu has released three singles: Dream About You All Through the Night, DISKO MUSHROOM, and TURBO, which led fans to speculate if a fourth album is coming soon.

== Discography ==
=== Albums ===
- Thierry Disko (2016)
- Satin Psicodelic (2018)
- JúJú & The Flowerbug (2022)

=== Singles ===
- Water (2015)
- Little Things (2017)
- God is a Woman (2017)
- Yours Truly, 2095 (2018)
- Supernova (2019)
- Slip n Slide (2020)
- Penny For Your Thoughts (2020)
- Provide (2021)
- Flowerbug (Interlude) (2021)
- Supernatural Woman (2022)
- Dream About You All Through The Night (2024)
- DISKO MUSHROOM (2024)
- TURBO (2024)

=== Features ===
- Braxe + Falcon - Elevation - (2023)
- Lee Bannon - PLACE/CRUSHER (2013)
