= Neil Frances =

Pop Duo

NEIL FRANCES
- Genres: Indie-Dance Music
- Years active: 2016-present
- Label: Nettwerk Music Group
- Members: Jordan Feller and Marc Gilfry
- Website: https://www.neilfrances.com/

Neil Frances are an indie-dance duo formed in 2016 by Jordan Feller and Marc Gilfry. Their 2017 cover of Stardust's "Music Sounds Better with You" was certified platinum in Australia and gold in Canada, with 5.9 million views on YouTube, over 197.2 million streams on Spotify and it went viral on TikTok with 631 million views.

The band's name is an amalgam of Feller's parents' names as Neil is Feller's father's name and Frances is his mother's name.

== Early life and education ==
Gilfry was raised in Rancho Cucamonga, California. He comes from a musical family: his mother is a choir teacher, his father, Rod Gilfry, is an opera singer as is his sister, Carin, who is also a voice actor. He has a Bachelor of Science degree in Audio Engineering.

Feller was raised in Sydney, Australia. His father, Neil, was in construction. Feller got his degree in business/economics. He was into disco, AC/DC, and West Coast Rap music, in particular anything that Death Row Records and Priority Records released. When he left school, Feller discovered dance music and self-taught himself how to deejay, which deepened his understanding on the integral nature of sampling in the music he was inspired by.

== Band history ==
=== Early years (2012-2018) ===
Feller and Gilfry met in 2012, each pursuing musical careers, when Feller remixed and produced two tracks for Marc's previous project. At the time, Feller was creating club music with his project, Light Year. Feller moved to London, Gilfry went to New York and a few years later, they coincidentally moved to Los Angeles in the same week. In 2016, Feller and Gilfry formed their band, NEIL FRANCES. Feller told the Village Voice that “when we shared the songs we'd written with some friends they gave us positive feedback, with one friend in particular sharing the songs with Chris Douridas at KCRW. To our complete surprise, Chris played one of the songs on the radio and the rest is kinda history.” Douridas called their cover of “Music Sounds Better With You,” an “elemental homage.” Feller and Gilfry told Complex Magazine that they'd covered the classic because "the track perfectly exemplifies sampling and the utter joy of finding a hook and repeating it at nauseam. The hooky repetition found in many of these late 90s house and French Touch records is a big influence on us."

NEIL FRANCES released their first EP in 2018, Took A While, which includes the tracks "Coming Back Around," "Ask Me Anything," "Dumb Love," "Daydreamer," "Show Me the Right," and "Took a While."

=== 2019-present ===
NEIL FRANCES' full band includes Rhythm Luna on drums and Greg Cham who played on both studio albums, There Is No NEIL FRANCES (2022) and It's All A Bit Fuzzy (2024).

NEIL FRANCES have been on tour with Rüfüs Du Sol, Jungle, Odesza, Empire Of The Sun, SG Lewis, and Unknown Mortal Orchestra. They have performed at festivals including Coachella, Lollapalooza, Austin City Limits, Portola, Bonnaroo, Outside Lands, Life Is Beautiful, Corona Capital, and Floodfest.

=== Club NF ===
Feller and Gilfry also tour as Club NF, which they created in 2024, focusing on a seamless live club music experience by remixing their studio albums in a live setting, and performing as a two-person set.

=== Collaborations ===
NEIL FRANCES have collaborated with Poolside on the single “I'm In Love With You,” dreamcastmoe on "She's Just the Type of Girl," Benny Sings on “Where I Become Someone,” Grae on “finding rhythm,” “High Notes,” with PawPaw Rod, “Head Straight” with St. Panther and DRAMA.

=== Discography ===
Took A While (EP) (2018)

Remixed (2020)

Stay Strong, Play Long (EP) (2021)

There Is No NEIL FRANCES (LP) (2022)

It's All A Bit Fuzzy (LP) (2024)
