= Despacio =

Despacio (Spanish for "slow") may refer to:

- DESPACIO, a live musical performance and the custom-built sound system on which it is played
- "Despacio", a song by Bad Gyal featuring Ms Nina from Slow Wine Mixtape
- "Despacio", a song by Juice and Rauw Alejandro
- "Despacio", a song by Natti Natasha featuring Nicky Jam, Manuel Turizo and Myke Towers
- "Despacio", a song by Nicky Jam featuring Arcángel from Fénix
- "Despacio", a song by Swagger and Rauw Alejandro
- "Despacio", a song by Yandel and Farruko

== See also ==
- "Despacito", a song by Luis Fonsi and Daddy Yankee
