= Together (duo) =

2000–2003 French house duo

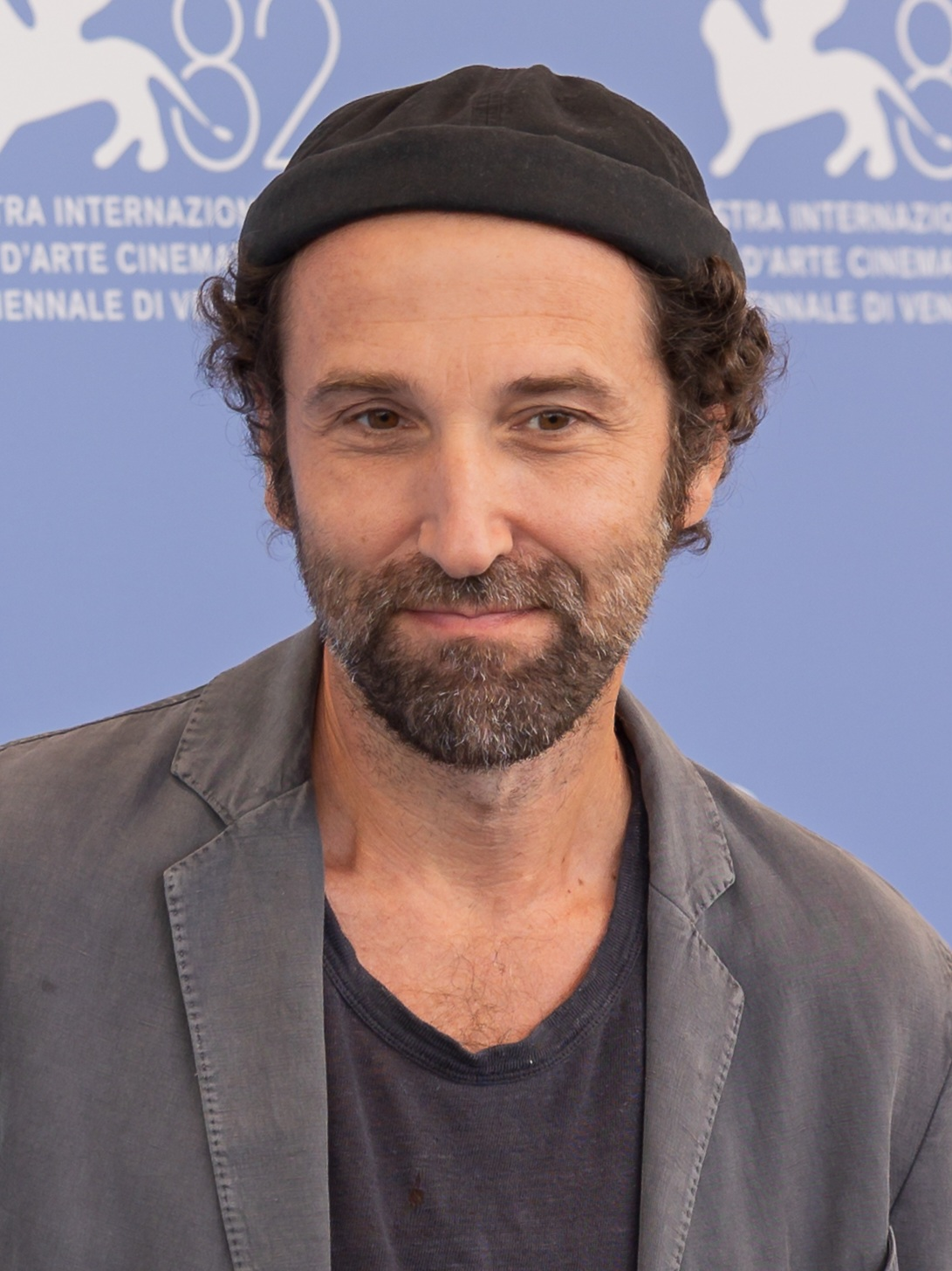
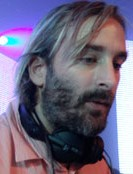
- Thomas Bangalter (left) in 2025 and DJ Falcon in 2010.

Background information
- Origin: Paris, France
- Genres: French house
- Years active: 2000–2003
- Label: Roulé
- Past members: DJ Falcon; Thomas Bangalter

Together was a French house duo consisting of DJ Falcon and the Daft Punk member Thomas Bangalter. They released two songs, one each in 2000 and 2002, on Bangalter's record label, Roulé: "Together" and "So Much Love to Give".

== History ==
Falcon first worked with Bangalter when Falcon sought to release his debut EP, Hello My Name is DJ Falcon, on Bangalter's label Roulé. Falcon reminisced on how their birthdays were only a day apart; Bangalter thus chose the day in between to work on a song together, although they danced more than they produced.

The song "Together" was released in 2000. Together's second track, "So Much Love to Give", was released in 2002. An imported version of the single reached number 71 on the UK singles chart in January 2003 (credited to Thomas Bangalter & DJ Falcon). "So Much Love to Give" contains a sample of "Love's Such a Wonderful Thing" by the Real Thing, which repeats throughout the song. The same sample was also used by Freeloaders in their 2005 single also titled "So Much Love to Give", and by Fedde le Grand, in his song "So Much Love".

Elements of the song "Together" appeared during the encore performance of Daft Punk's 2007 live sets. It is paired with Stardust's song, "Music Sounds Better with You", as well as Daft Punk's tracks "Human After All", "One More Time", and "Aerodynamic". A recording is included in the two-disc edition of the live album Alive 2007. Both the sets and the album renewed interest in the song. Falcon co-produced the Daft Punk track "Contact" from the 2013 album Random Access Memories.

Together inspired the 2004 track "Call on Me" by Eric Prydz. Together had performed a similar track in their live sets; after they declined to release it, Prydz recreated it.

== Discography ==
=== Singles ===
- "Together" (2000)
- "So Much Love to Give" (2002)
