= Together (Together song) =

Single by Together
- Released: August 2000
- Recorded: 2–3 January 2000
- Genre: French house
- Length: 7:05
- Label: Roulé
- Songwriters: Thomas Bangalter; DJ Falcon; Keith Wesley Nash
- Producers: Thomas Bangalter; DJ Falcon

Together singles chronology
"Together" (2000)	"So Much Love to Give" (2002)

"Together" is the debut single by Together, a French electronic music duo consisting of Thomas Bangalter and DJ Falcon.

== Background ==
Falcon reminisced on how his and Bangalter's birthdays are only a day apart; Bangalter thus chose the day in between to collaborate on a new song. "Together" begins with a short segment of speech from the film Pleasantville. The line "A time has come to make a decision: are we in this thing alone, or are we in it together?" appears in the bowling scene of the film. The main vocals in the song, consisting of the word "Together" looped ad infinitum, are a sample of Sweet Sensation's "Sincerely Yours". The background vocals, also the word "Together" looped, were sampled from Slave's "Because of You". The bassline was interpolated from the Beverly Hills, 90210 theme song.

The song has been used by Daft Punk as part of the encore played at their Alive 2007 sets. That encore also includes Stardust's "Music Sounds Better with You", elements of "One More Time", "Aerodynamic", "Human After All", "Revolution 909", and the Para One remix of "The Prime Time of Your Life". In 2013, the Stafford Brothers named it one of the best Valentine's Day tracks.

== Track listing ==
1. "Together" – 7:05
