= The Upper Cuts =

2005 compilation album by Alan Braxe

Compilation album by Alan Braxe & Friends
- Genre: French house; nu-disco
- Length: 1:06:12
- Label: Vulture Music, PIAS
- Producer: Alan Braxe

The Upper Cuts is a compilation album of house music by Alan Braxe. It was released on Play It Again Sam records in June 2005.

== History ==
Xavier de Rosnay, one of the two members of Justice, and graphic designer So Me designed the artwork.

A reissue of the album was released on 31 March 2023, which included remastered tracks and previously unreleased tracks.

Professional ratings
Review scores
Source	Rating
Pitchfork	8.9/10

== Track listing ==
No.	Title	Artist(s)	Length
1.	"Most Wanted"	Alan Braxe & Fred Falke	6:34
2.	"In Love With You"	The Paradise a.k.a. Alan Braxe & Romuald	4:14
3.	"Music Sounds Better With You"	Stardust	6:46
4.	"Intro"	Alan Braxe & Fred Falke	4:54
5.	"At Night (Alan Braxe Remix)"	Shakedown	6:32
6.	"Love Lost"	Alan Braxe & Fred Falke	5:52
7.	"Palladium"	Alan Braxe & Fred Falke	6:13
8.	"Arena"	Alan Braxe & Fred Falke	3:35
9.	"Rubicon"	Alan Braxe & Fred Falke	6:16
10.	"Penthouse Serenade"	Alan Braxe & Fred Falke	4:04
11.	"Link'n'Rings"	Rec	4:10
12.	"Vertigo"	Alan Braxe	7:02

=== 2023 reissue ===
No.	Title	Artist(s)	Length
1.	"Most Wanted"	Alan Braxe & Fred Falke	6:34
2.	"In Love With You"	The Paradise a.k.a. Alan Braxe & Romuald	4:14
3.	"Music Sounds Better With You" (Radio edit)	Stardust	4:22
4.	"Intro"	Alan Braxe & Fred Falke	4:54
5.	"At Night (Alan Braxe Remix)"	Shakedown	6:32
6.	"Love Lost"	Alan Braxe & Fred Falke	5:52
7.	"Palladium"	Alan Braxe & Fred Falke	6:13
8.	"Arena"	Alan Braxe & Fred Falke	3:35
9.	"Rubicon"	Alan Braxe & Fred Falke	6:16
10.	"Penthouse Serenade"	Alan Braxe & Fred Falke	4:04
11.	"Chrystal City"	Alan Braxe & Fred Falke	4:03
12.	"Voices"	Alan Braxe	3:40
13.	"Anticipating (Alan Braxe Remix)"	Britney Spears	2:03
14.	"One More Chance (Redux)"	Alan Braxe feat. The Spimes	3:15
15.	"True Love"	Alan Braxe	2:32
16.	"Never Coming Back"	Alan Braxe feat. Annie	3:23
17.	"You'll Stay in My Heart" (Instrumental)	Alan Braxe & Fred Falke	3:31
