= Pépé Bradock =

French electronic music producer and DJ

- Also known as: Braccio D'Oco, Brad Peep, Brigitte Barbu, Gordon Bass
- Born: Julien Auger
- Genres: Electronic, French house
- Years active: 1997–present
- Label: Atavisme
- Formerly of: Trankilou

Pépé Bradock is the alias of French electronic music producer, remixer and DJ Julien Auger, who is associated with deep house, French house and the French touch movement.

Bradock's work has been noted for its eclectic production style and his low public profile within the underground electronic music scene.

In addition to Pépé Bradock, Auger has recorded under the aliases Braccio D'Oco, Brad Peep, Brigitte Barbu and Gordon Bass.

== Career ==
Pépé Bradock emerged from the Paris underground club scene during the rise of the French touch movement, a period associated with the international popularity of French house music.

Early in his career, Auger specialised in deep house and collaborated with fellow producer Guillaume Berroyer (Ark) and Frédéric Camus (Doo Bass) under the name Trankilou. Following the group's separation after the release of their second album, Auger adopted the Pépé Bradock moniker for his solo work.

Bradock has described his creative process as intuitive and experimental, producing music that blends diverse musical traditions. His productions are characterised by experimentation, intuition and an openness to the chaos of chance. He has described composing music by pairing randomly selected words with frequencies chosen for their perceived synchronicities in areas such as orbital rhythms, colour spectra and electromagnetic fields. His recordings frequently resist conventional categorisations. He has been consistent in this experimental and playful approach with the presentation of his music as well. On his album What A Mess!, Bradock omitted official track titles. Instead, he invited listeners to generate their own titles, and consequently meanings, from a selection of words printed on the album sleeve.

Although associated with the French touch generation, Bradock's music differs from the disco-sampling, filter-heavy sound that came to define the movement. Instead, Bradock developed an eclectic, sample-based style drawing on deep house, soul, funk, jazz, hip hop, ambient music and techno, while simultaneously experimenting with unconventional compositional structures and production techniques.

I try to experiment with something new and observe the result, and try not to forget to click on "save"! Otherwise, you lose everything. Which unfortunately happens too often.

— Pépé Bradock, 2015 interview with Red Bull Music Academy

For example, the album What A Mess! consists of a single continuous recording split across two sides of vinyl. Rather than assigning track titles, Bradock invited listeners to create their own names from words printed on the album sleeve, saying he wanted listeners to interpret the music freely.

The first Pépé Bradock EP, St. Glin Glin, was produced in 1994 and released in 1996 by Trankilou. In English, the phrase "à la Saint-Glinglin" suggests empty promises and roughly translates to the idiom "when pigs fly." Pépé Bradock often incorporates his love of history and humour into his track names. His 2015 album, Le Fada, features tracks including "Abul-Abbas", "Choses Irréparables," and "Homo Sandwichus". Le Fada's opening track "Abul-Abbas" is an homage to the legendary white war elephant of the same name given to Charlemagne by Harun al-Rashid as a diplomatic gift.

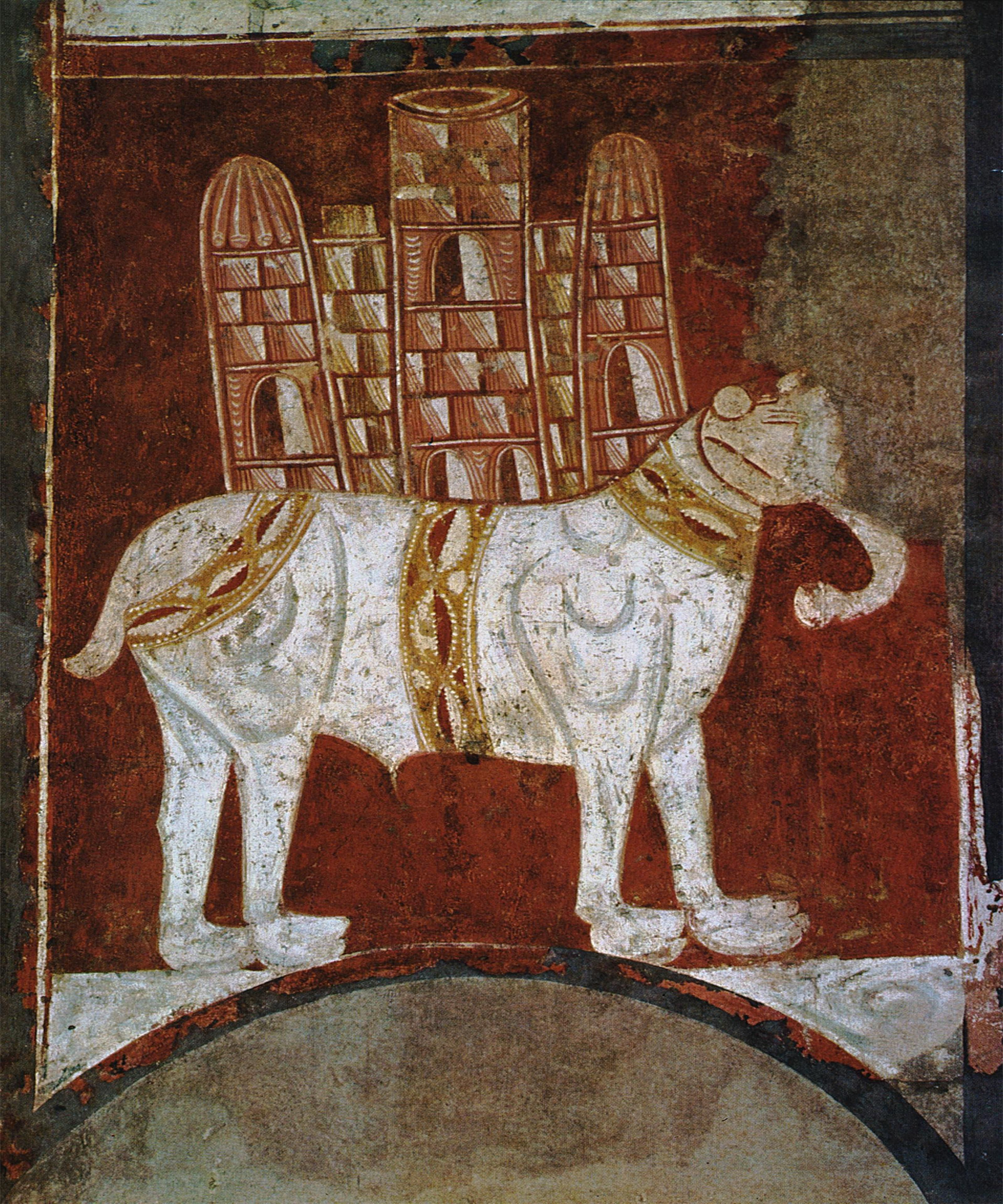
Illustration of Abul-Abbas, Charlemagne's legendary white elephant

Bradock released the EP Un Pépé En Or Vol. 1 on Kif Recordings in 1997. In 1998, he released Synthèse on the French label Versatile Records. In 1999, Bradock released the album Burning on KIF Recordings. The album included an eleven-minute two-second track called "Deep Burnt" on the B-side. "Deep Burnt" contains samples from Freddie Hubbard's 1979 song "Little Sunflower, Driva' Man" by Max Roach and "Hard Luck Blues" by Tommy Tucker.

Although "Deep Burnt" received little mainstream commercial attention upon its release, it later achieved international recognition within electronic music. "Deep Burnt" became one of the defining recordings of late-1990s deep house through sustained support from the DJ community. The track's sparse, sample-based production and extended structure distinguished it from the French house that dominated the period. "Deep Burnt" is widely regarded as one of the genre's essential recordings. Resident Advisor described the recording as a certifiable deep house classic. Bradock himself has referred to "Deep Burnt" as "Cubism for ravers." More than two decades after its release, "Deep Burnt" was included in Pitchfork's 2022 feature, "The 30 Best House Tracks of the '90s", compiled by music journalists Philip Sherburne and Ben Cardew.

The Guardian has described Bradock as "a producer whose beautifully odd take on house has earned him a rabid cult fan base."

Bradock has remained a low-profile figure within French house music, with his work gaining recognition primarily through specialist audiences, DJs and music critics. He operates his own label, Atavisme, which is used as a platform for producing experimental releases.

In an era of over-the-top French filter house (and over-cranked music in general), Pépé Bradock came through with a second-wave deep-house classic whose dusky palette and earworm grooves made it a staple of DJ crates from Detroit to Berlin.

— Vivian Host, "The 30 Best House Tracks of the 90s" by Pitchfork

== Discography ==
=== Albums ===
- Synthèse (1998)
- Confiote De Bits / A Remix Collection (2009)
- What a Mess! (2019)

=== EP ===
- 1997: Un Pepe En Or (Vol. 1)
- 1998: Un Pepe En Or (Vol. 2)
- 1998: Burning
- 2000: 6 Millions Pintades
- 2002: The Forbidden Fruit
- 2003: 4
- 2007: Rhapsody In Pain
- 2007: Les Aventures De Pépé Bradock / Pistes Insolites Vol. 1: Sakura Incident
- 2008: Les Aventures De Pépé Bradock / Pistes Insolites Vol. 2: Intriguing Feathered Creature
- 2008: Les Aventures De Pépé Bradock / Pistes Insolites Vol. 3
- 2009: Swimsuit Issue 1789
- 2012: Imbroglios Part.I
- 2012: Imbroglios Part.II
- 2013: Acid Test 07
- 2013: Imbroglios Part.III
- 2013: Imbroglios Part.IV

=== With Trankilou ===
- 1996: St Glin-Glin EP
- 1997: Escalope De Dingue EP

== Remixes ==
| Year | Artist | Title |
|---|---|---|
| 1997 | Château Flight | "Discobole" |
| 1998 | Presence (featuring Shara Nelson) | "Sense Of Danger" |
| 1998 | Cheek | "Venus (Sunshine People)" |
| 1998 | Alex Gopher | "You, My Baby & I" |
| 1999 | Cassius | "La Mouche" |
| 1999 | Iz & Diz | "What You Need" |
| 1999 | Soulstice | "Tenderly" |
| 1999 | Mozesli | "Love & Slackness" |
| 2001 | Block 16 | "Morning Sun" |
| 2002 | Iz & Diz | "Mouth" |
| 2002 | Gotan Project | "Santa Maria (Del Buen Ayre)" |
| 2002 | Incognito | "Skin On My Skin" |
| 2003 | Cesária Évora | "Angola" |
| 2003 | Kemetic Just | "Do You Remember" |
| 2003 | Charles Webster | "I'm Falling" |
| 2005 | Greenskeepers | "Man In The House" |
| 2005 | Roy Ayers | "I Am Your Mind (Part. II)" |
| 2006 | Iz & Diz | "Love Vibe" |
| 2007 | Zero 7 | "Today" |
| 2008 | International Pony | "Bubble In The Bottle" |
| 2008 | Namlook | "Subharmonic Atoms" |
| 2009 | Manuel Tur | "Golden Complexion" |
| 2010 | Nicolas Jaar | "Too Many Kids Finding Rain In The Dust" |
| 2013 | Dinky | "Falling Angel" |
| 2013 | Webster Wraight Ensemble | "The Ruins Of Britain" |
