= Portola Music Festival =

American music festival held in San Francisco, California

- Genre: Electronic dance music
- Dates: End of September
- Locations: Pier 80 (San Francisco, California, U.S.)
- Years active: 2022–present
- Organiser: Goldenvoice
- Website: portolamusicfestival.com

The Portola Music Festival, or simply Portola, is an annual music festival held at Pier 80 in San Francisco, California. The festival made its debut in 2022. It is presented by Goldenvoice, the same company that promotes Coachella. The event primarily features electronic dance music. Limited to people over the age of 21, it is intended to "present electronic music in an adult way".

The Despacio tent debuted at Portola in 2025. Long lines were reported in 2025 and 2026.

== Origin ==
The festival is named after the October 19-23, 1909 Portolá Festival and Portola Road Race, events thrown by the city of San Francisco to demonstrate its recovery from the 1906 earthquake.

== Noise complaints ==
The event received noise complaints from residents of the city of Alameda which is located across the San Francisco Bay from Pier 80. The city requested that the festival be discontinued or moved to a different location due to the various noise complaints from its residents. The highest sound level recorded by sound monitors located in Alameda was 61.4 dBA, which is below the city's noise ordinance of 70 dBA. However, the dBA scale, A-weighting, attenuates low frequency audio by as much as 40 decibels, implying the actual noise level at the lowest audio frequencies could have been as high as 101 decibels.

The 2023 festival received 235 noise complaints and the 2024 festival received 224 noise complaints, despite mitigation efforts. The festival on Sunday went until 10:45 pm in 2024, compared with 11:00 pm in 2023.

== Festival summary by year ==
Edition	Year	Dates	Headliners	Attendance or sales	Ref.
1st	2022	September 24–25	Flume; The Chemical Brothers	30,000 (attendance)	
2nd	2023	September 30–October 1	Skrillex; Eric Prydz	—N/a	
3rd	2024	September 28–29	Justice; Gesaffelstein; Disclosure; M.I.A.; Rüfüs Du Sol; Fisher; Four Tet; Jamie xx	42,000 (attendees per day)	
4th	2025	September 20–21	LCD Soundsystem; Christina Aguilera; The Chemical Brothers; Anti Up; Mau P; Dom Dolla; Peggy Gou; The Prodigy; Underworld	—N/a	
5th	2026	September 26–27	Robyn; Dog Blood; Zara Larsson; Tiësto; Swedish House Mafia; Four Tet	—N/a	

== See also ==
- Despacio (audio)
