= Freeloaders (band) =

English music duo

- Origin: United Kingdom
- Genre: House
- Years active: 2004–2006
- Past members: Kevin O'Toole; Dale Longworth

Freeloaders discography
- Studio albums: 1
- Singles: 2
- Music videos: 1
- Remixes: 1

The Freeloaders were an English house music duo formed in 2004 by Kevin O'Toole and Dale Longworth, the founder members of N-Trance.

Under this alias they released a UK Top 10 single, "So Much Love to Give", which sampled The Real Thing; and an album Freshly Squeezed. Other musicians involved with the Freeloaders were Jerome Stokes and Vinny Burns.

== Discography ==
=== Albums ===
- Freshly Squeezed (2006)

=== Singles ===
List of singles, with selected peak chart positions
Year	Title	Peak chart positions							Album
Year	Title	UK	AUS	AUT	BEL	GER	IRE	NLD	Album
"So Much Love to Give"	2005	9	98	30	49	65	26	32	Freshly Squeezed
"Now I'm Free (Freefalling)"	2006	—	—	—	—	—	—	—	Freshly Squeezed
"–" denotes release did not chart.

=== Music videos ===
Year	Title	Director
2005	"So Much Love to Give"	Graham Hector

=== Remixes ===
Year	Artist	Title
2005	The Lazyboyz featuring Kym Mazelle	"Bitch (I'm Gonna Getcha)"

== See also ==
- N-Trance
