= Despacio (audio) =

Vinyl DJ performance and sound system

- Status: Active
- Genre: Disco, dance music
- Frequency: Irregular
- Years active: 2013–present
- Founded: 2013
- Founders: James Murphy; David and Stephen Dewaele; John Klett
- Participants: James Murphy, 2manydjs
- Major events: All-vinyl DJ sets
- Sponsor: McIntosh Laboratory

Despacio, usually styled as DESPACIO, is a live musical performance and the name of the custom-built sound system on which it is played. Despacio means “slow” in Spanish and refers to the slower beats per minute of the music compared to contemporary electronic dance music (EDM). Despacio is all-vinyl live performance by DJs on a one-of-a-kind sound system.

Despacio was designed by audio engineer John Klett and James Murphy of LCD Soundsystem with David and Stephen Dewaele, aka 2manydjs, of Soulwax. The reason behind creating and performing with Despacio is to encourage DJs to implement a similar sound system, altering the course of DJ culture to its dance roots.. Despacio performances have gained a cult following, with audiophile fans working together to catalog all tracks played.

The sound system boasts nearly 50,000 watts of power, “leaving the [two 21-inch] subwoofers out of the equation,” according to Klett.

Despacio offers a discothèque experience with custom lighting and seven speaker stacks of McIntosh Laboratory equipment. The DJs perform off to the side, and a large disco ball becomes the central attraction.

Despacio debuted in 2013. MusicTech called Despacio the “world’s greatest sound system” in 2019. The Despacio tent has become a staple of the Portola Music Festival, often with long lines to enter. In 2026, the artists offered a special Day Zero performance before the opening of Portola, with fans hosting a pre-event brunch, making custom swag, and creating a fan zine.

The most recent Despacio event was at the 2026 Harry Styles Harryween concert in New York.
