= Muttonheads =

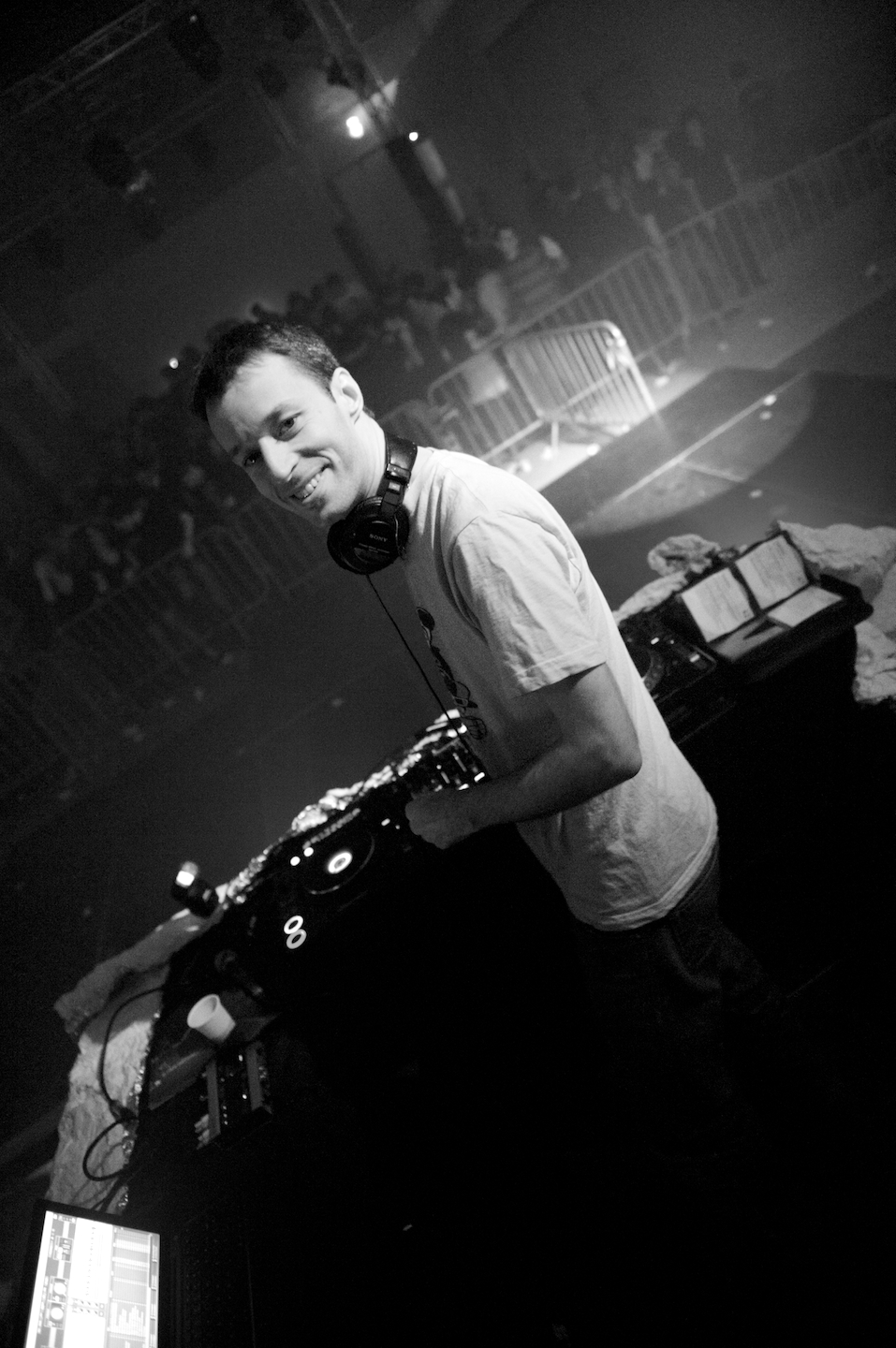
- Muttonheads in concert.

Background information
- Born: Jérôme Tissot; May 3, 1976 (age 50); Chambéry
- Origin: France
- Genres: House, EDM
- Years active: 2004–present
- Label: Serial Records
- Website: www.muttonheads.com

Jérôme Tissot (born 3 May 1976 in Chambéry), better known by his stage name Muttonheads, is a French DJ and electronic music producer. His music is described as French Touch (French house music) with funk and Italo disco.

== Career ==
Tissot started very early experimenting with demo releases in the early 1990s and had his first show on 23 May 2001, at Divan du Monde in Paris. By 2004, he started releasing a series of EPs on Serial Records label with To You that gained popularity in European disco scene, followed by a second Smashing Music often played by well-known DJs and I'll Be There that actually found radio play.

In 2006, Muttonheads started his own podcasts, proposing every two weeks electronic and house music titles and remixes. The podcasts were taken by a dozen stations and webradios in France and elsewhere. This led to a residency at Radio FG where he became "Artiste FG". He is also regularly invited to stations like Contact FM, Fun Radio and NRJ.

Muttonheads has made dozens of remixes including for artists Moby, Katerine, Joachim Garraud, Arno Cost, Laurent Wolf and Da Fresh, also encouraging younger artists in remixes and co-productions like Sven.K, Hard Rock Sofa, Steve Mac, Ilan Tenenbaum, JSR & Bassfly, Di Feno & Alls and Wize and even launched online remix contests to attract. His unofficial remix of Daft Punk's "Around the World" gained popularity. In 2009, he also took part in RedKatz Immersion alongside many acts including Avicii.

In 2009–2010 he worked on his first studio album Demomaker qui sort en 2010. He continues his long collaborations with Mathieu Bouthier and with vocalist Eden Martin.

== Serial Crew ==
Muttonheads was involved in forming of the French electronic music group collaboration that included Mathieu Bouthier and Demon Ritchie under the collective name Serial Crew that launched him with the single "Need U" that was released by ULM (a sub-label affiliated with Universal Music). It crossed over to the UK becoming a "buzz" single, topped popular FG playlist charts for 10 weeks and was licensed to many European labels through Universal/ULM.

In 2007, Muttonheads also released "Make Your Own Kind of Music" that credited Muttonheads vs. Mathieu Bouthier.

== Discography ==
=== Albums ===
- Demomaker (2015)

=== EPs ===
- To You (2004)
- Smashing Music
- I'll Be There

=== Singles ===
Year	Single	Peak positions				Album
Year	Single	FR	BEL (Wa) Ultratop	BEL (Wa) Ultratip*	SWI	Album
2007	"Make Your Own Kind of Music" (Muttonheads vs. Mathieu Bouthier)	44	–	–	–	
2011	"Trust You Again" (feat. Eden Martin)	20	–	8	–	
2013	"Snow White (Alive)" (feat. Eden Martin)	16	–	8	44	

*Did not appear in the official Belgian Ultratop 50 charts, but rather in the bubbling under Ultratip charts.
