= So Much Love to Give =

2002 single by Together

Single by Together
- Released: December 2002
- Genre: French house
- Length: 10:43
- Label: Roulé
- Composers: Thomas Bangalter; DJ Falcon
- Producers: Thomas Bangalter; DJ Falcon

Together singles chronology
| "Together" (2000) | "So Much Love to Give" (2002) |

"So Much Love to Give" is a 2002 single released by French house duo Together, consisting of DJ Falcon and Thomas Bangalter. The song contains a sample of "Love's Such a Wonderful Thing" by the Real Thing.

The song received acclaim for its euphoric production and was considered one of the greatest dance songs. The Guardian recognized it as the fourth-best French touch track in 2024.

== Critical reception ==
Vice's Ryan Bassil wrote that "the image of heaven – or a similarly flawless place – continues to be the thing I think about when I hear this song". Bassil wrote that the sample served as the song's bedrock, praising it as "a never-changing, constant, euphoric nebula." He said the combination of the vocal and the "warm, original" production made it "intoxicating", and felt that the repetition "creates a trance-like feeling, where the sounds become a kaleidoscope; where intimate and tiny details shift, but on a grand scale." KCRW called it "a ten-plus minute epic that you may love, hate, grudgingly respect, and love again all within a single listen." Pitchfork said it "bulldozes the path from repetition to delirium using the grand sum of seven words over 11 minutes".

The Guardian's Ben Beaumont-Thomas praised "its 10 minutes of overwhelming euphoria, where a maximalist arrangement of in-the-red synths and repeated declaration of love is followed by the same maximalist arrangement of in-the-red synths and repeated declaration of love, this time with a whacking great bass drum added." He added that song has the ability to erase "the intellectual capacity of an entire dancefloor" when it is played. Complex said it was "like an experiment: how much repetition could a listener or dancer take", and said that Falcon and Bangalter's answer was "given the right injection of euphoria ... a lot".

== Track listing ==
1. "So Much Love to Give" – 10:43

== Charts ==
| Chart (2002) | Peak position |
|---|---|
| Scottish Singles Sales (Official Charts) | 72 |
| UK Singles (Official Charts) | 71 |
| UK Dance (Official Charts) | 3 |

== Freeloaders version ==
"So Much Love to Give"

Single by Freeloaders featuring the Real Thing
- Released: 2005
- Length: 3:06
- Label: All Around the World
- Songwriters: Chris Amoo; Eddie Amoo
- Producers: Dale Longworth; Kevin O'Toole

Freeloaders singles chronology
| "So Much Love to Give" (2005) | "Now I'm Free (Freefalling)" (2006) |

The Real Thing singles chronology
| "The Crime of Love" (1989) | "So Much Love to Give" (2005) |

Music video
- "So Much Love to Give" on YouTube

A sample of "So Much Love to Give" was prominently used by British duo Freeloaders for their 2005 single also titled "So Much Love to Give". It was mastered at Propaganda Productions by Guy Lenzer and publishing by Sony Music. The song reached number nine on the UK Singles Chart and peaked within the top 50 in Flemish Belgium, Germany, Ireland and the Netherlands.

=== Track listing ===
1. "So Much Love to Give" (radio edit) – 3:06
2. "So Much Love to Give" (extended mix) – 7:14
3. "So Much Love to Give" (Morjac remix) – 6:12
4. "So Much Love to Give" (Kenny Hayes remix) – 7:06
5. "So Much Love to Give" (Basscore mix) – 7:11
6. "So Much Love to Give" (Milk & Sugar remix) – 8:04
7. "So Much Love to Give" (Freefunkt mix) – 6:36

The EP also included the music video for the song.

=== Charts ===
==== Weekly charts ====
| Chart (2005) | Peak position |
|---|---|
| Australia (ARIA) | 98 |
| Austria (Ö3 Austria Top 40) | 65 |
| Belgium (Ultratop 50 Flanders) | 32 |
| Germany (GfK) | 49 |
| Ireland (IRMA) | 30 |
| Ireland Dance (IRMA) | 1 |
| Netherlands (Dutch Top 40) | 21 |
| Netherlands (Single Top 100) | 26 |
| Scottish Singles Sales (Official Charts) | 6 |
| UK Singles (Official Charts) | 9 |
| UK Dance (Official Charts) | 9 |

==== Year-end charts ====
| Chart (2005) | Position |
|---|---|
| UK Singles (OCC) | 193 |
