= Axel Boman =

Swedish DJ (born 1979)

Axel Boman (born 1979) is a Swedish house music DJ and producer born in Stockholm.

Boman made a breakthrough with his EP Holy Love on Pampa Records in 2010 where the song "Purple Drank" became a hit in the house music scene, since then he has been touring extensively and made remixes for artists like John Talabot and Harald Bjork. He is also a part of the label Studio Barnhus. Boman's music has been described as "raw, playful and drenched in oceans of soul". Boman graduated from Valand School of Fine Arts in 2010. Boman also released his debut album Family Vacation, heavily inspired by his German cousin Julius Drescher.

His mother is actress Iwa Boman.
