= DJ Falcon =

French DJ, record producer, and photographer

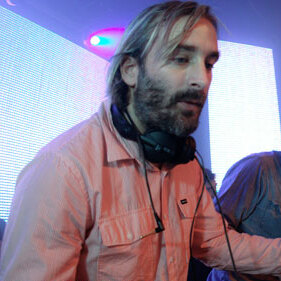
- DJ Falcon in 2010

Background information
- Born: Stéphane Quême; 2 January 1973 (age 53); Paris, France
- Origin: France
- Genres: French house
- Occupations: DJ; record producer; photographer
- Years active: 1999–present
- Member of: Braxe + Falcon
- Formerly of: Together
- Website: www.myspace.com/djfalconparis

Stéphane Quême (French pronunciation: [stefan kɛm]) (born January 2, 1973), known as DJ Falcon, is a French DJ, record producer and photographer. He is the brother of Delphine Quême (Quartet) and a cousin of Alan Braxe (Alain Quême). He has been described as "French touch's great minimalist".

== Career ==
In 1999, Falcon released his first EP on Roulé, Thomas Bangalter of Daft Punk's music label. Before producing on Roulé, he worked in the A&R department at Virgin. Following the release of his EP, he worked with Bangalter to form the group Together, officially releasing two songs "So Much Love to Give" and "Together." He has done a significant number of remixes and DJ sets since.

In 2013, he was featured on Daft Punk's fourth studio album, Random Access Memories on the final track "Contact". The song was based on a sample Falcon and Bangalter had originally used and performed while doing DJ sets as Together.

In 2022, Falcon and Alan Braxe debuted new music on a new record label Smugglers Way, an imprint of Domino, that intends to release new and old French house music from the duo and from other artists. In addition to this, the pair announced the two had begun making music as a duo named Braxe + Falcon, with their first single featuring vocals from Panda Bear released in March, and their first EP in August.

== Discography ==
=== Releases ===
- Hello My Name Is DJ Falcon (1999)

==== With Together ====
- "Together" (2000)
- "So Much Love to Give" (2002)

==== With Braxe + Falcon ====
- "Step by Step" feat. Panda Bear / "Creative Source" (2022)
- Step By Step EP (2022)
- Step By Step Remixes EP (2023)

=== Remixes ===
Year	Title	Artist	Album
1999	"La Mouche" (Played Live By DJ Falcon)	Cassius	1999
1999	"La Mouche" (DJ Falcon Metal Mix)	Cassius	1999
1999	"La Mouche" (DJ Falcon vs Harry "Choo-Choo" Romero 'The Edit')	Cassius	1999
2012	"New Lands" (Falcon Remix)	Justice	Audio, Video, Disco
2012	"Hello Inc." (DJ Falcon Parallel Remix)	Alex Gopher	Hello Inc. EP
2012	"Hello Inc." (DJ Falcon Remix)	Alex Gopher	Hello Inc. EP
2013	"Time Machine" (DJ Falcon Remix)	Alan Braxe	Moments In Time EP
2022	"Bubble Guts" (Braxe + Falcon Remix)	A-Trak	Non-album single
2022	"Eleanor" (Braxe + Falcon Remix)	Hot Chip	Freakout/Release
2022	"Good Times" (Braxe + Falcon Remix)	Jungle	Non-album single
2023	"Winter Solstice" (Braxe + Falcon Remix)	Phoenix	Alpha Zulu

=== Appears on ===
- "Contact" – Daft Punk (2013)
