= Knockdown Center =

Venue in Queens, NYC

Coordinates: 40°42′55″N 73°54′49″W

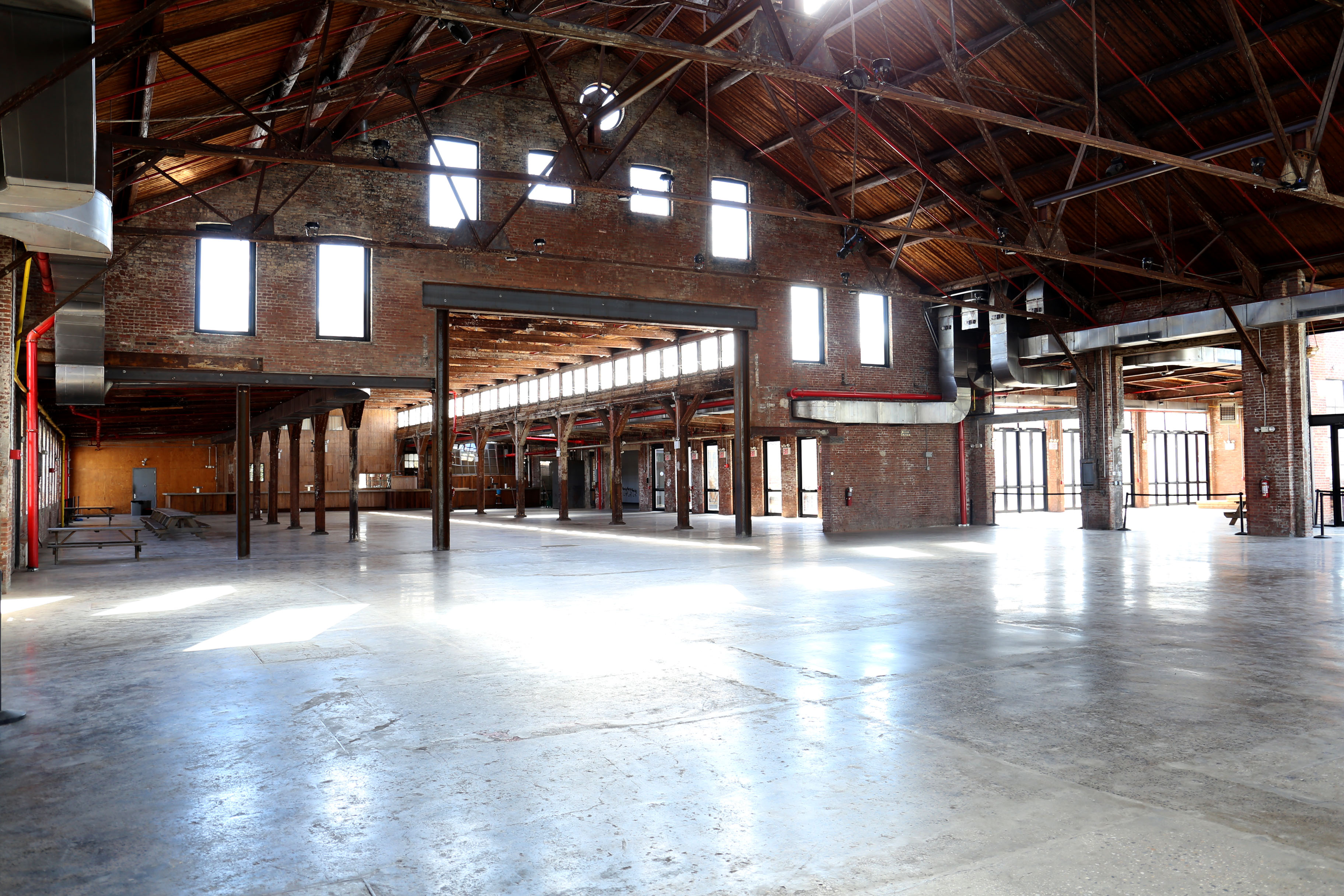
The main hall of Knockdown Center in 2017.

Knockdown Center is a cultural space, performance venue, and art center, located in the Maspeth neighborhood of Queens, New York City. The Center includes many architecturally notable features: 20,000 square-foot main hall, a backyard nicknamed The Ruins, a large gallery, and several other adjacent halls of varying sizes.

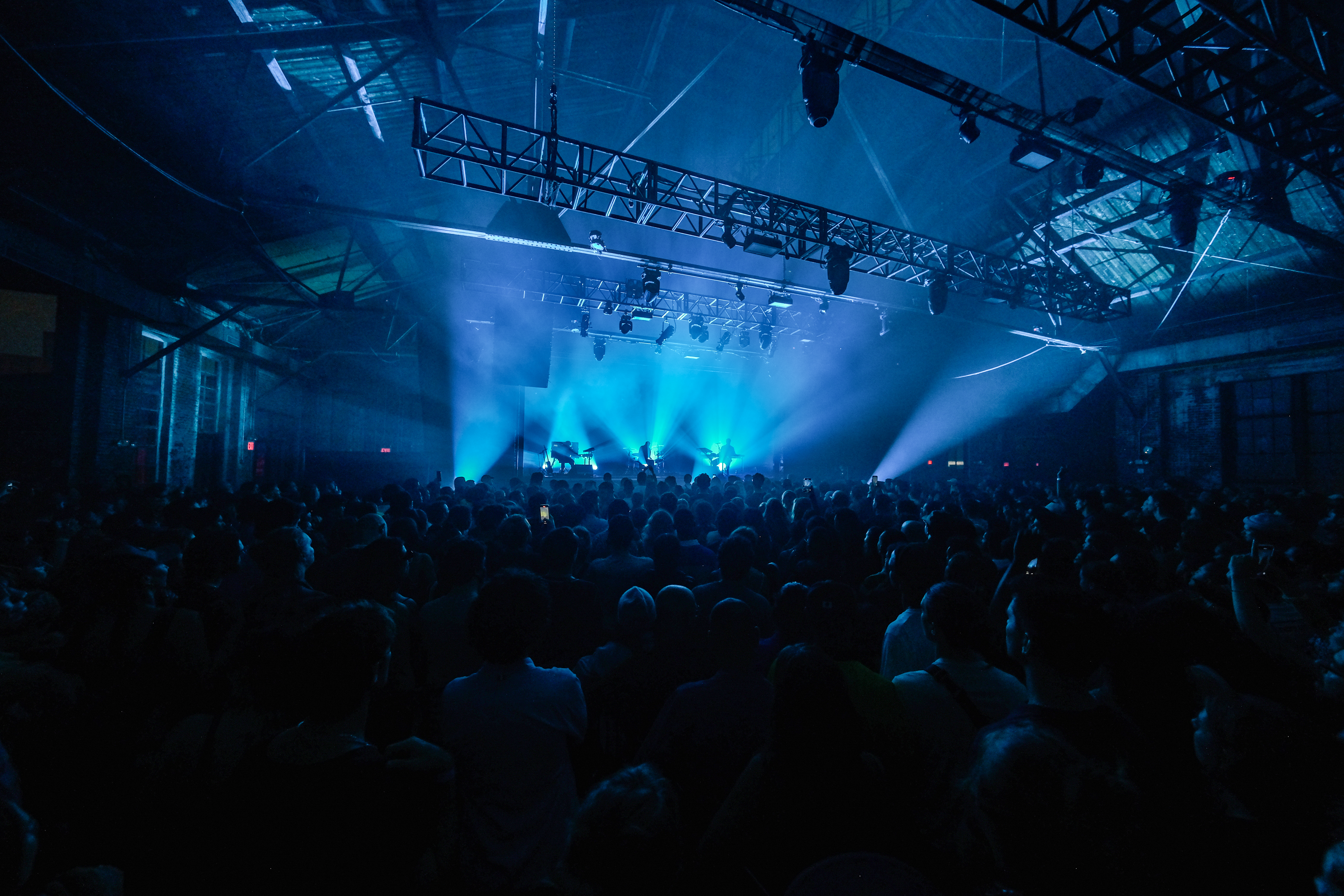
Interior of Knockdown Center during an event.

Since 2013, Knockdown Center has been the venue of many musical and visual art events. As of 2026, some especially notable artists who have performed there include Wu-Tang Clan, Madonna, LCD Soundsystem, Jeff Mills, Sara Landry, Kim Gordon, Turnstile, Arca, Solomun, Frank Ocean, Kneecap, Honey Dijon, Animal Collective, Juice Wrld, James Blake, Fred Again, Sunn O))), Yung Lean, CNBLUE, and Chelsea Manning. In addition the venue has hosted events for New York City Mayor Mamdani, Carnegie Hall, and the MET Opera.

Knockdown Center is also home to BASEMENT (opened in May 2019) a techno club, and The Ruins, an on-site outdoor venue. It is home to NYC's Horsemeat Disco and Tiki Disco events and annual events Bushwig, Get Wrecked and Carry Pride, Haunted Hop, Everyday People Roller Disco, and Coldest Winter Ball.

== History ==
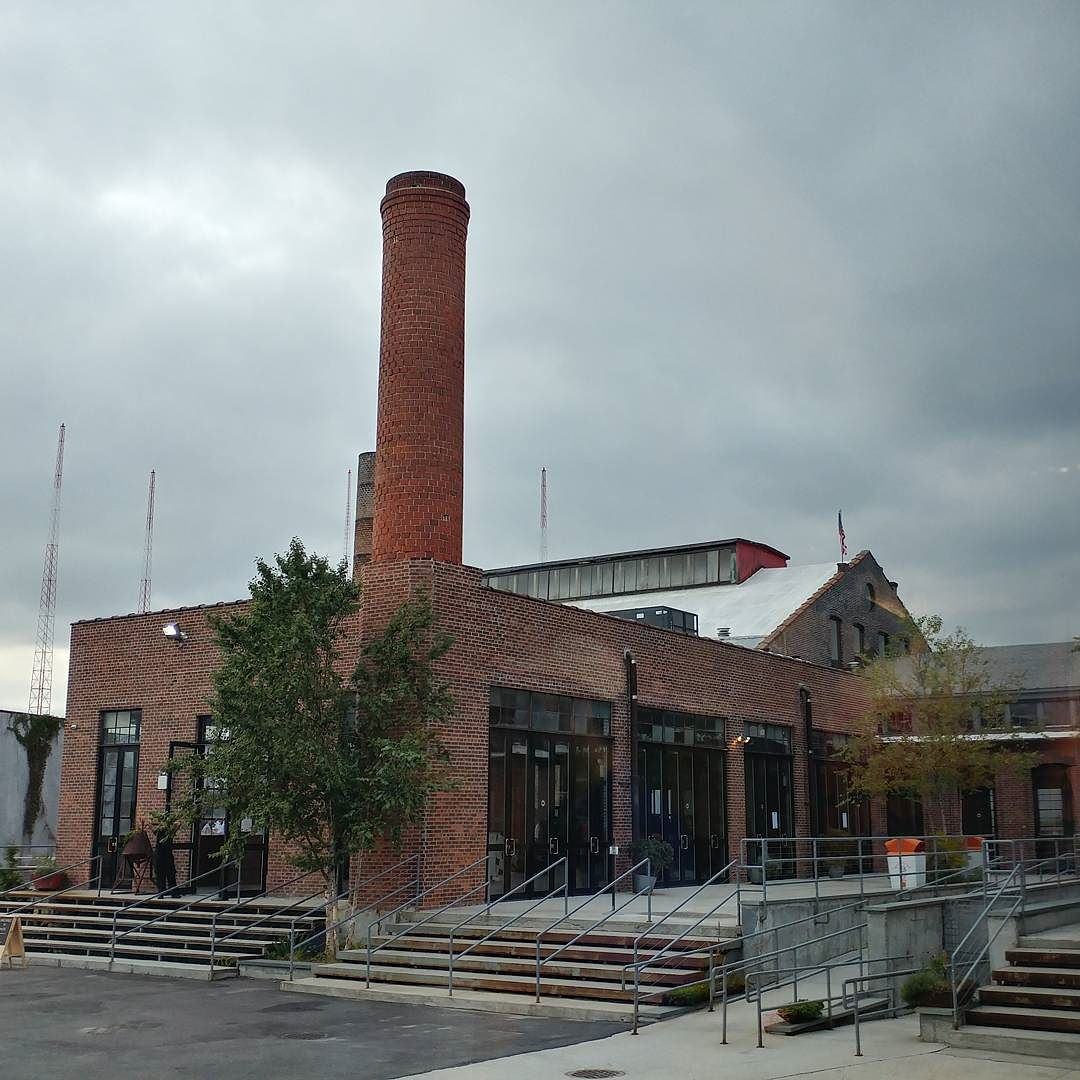
An exterior shot of the side gallery.

The building has been in continuous use for 100 years. Constructed in 1903, it was first used as a glass factory by the Gleason-Tiebout Glass Company. In the 1930s, the proprietor of the building transitioned the warehouse for a door manufacturing company. Named the Manhattan Door Factory, this company invented the "knock-down frame," a kind of door which allows contractors to build walls first and then install doors later.

The warehouse became vacant in 2010, when the door company moved its operations to New Jersey. In the years that followed until 2013, the grandson of the original proprietor who inherited the grounds began cleaning the building up.

In 2012, as Knockdown Center, Michael Merck, Kate Watson, and Tyler Myers opened an outdoor exhibition of sculptural mini-golf holes, commissioned after a call for entries. A few events began in 2013 before the building was renovated. The building’s first liquor license application was denied in April, 2014 prior to an M.I.A. concert on May 9, 2014.

The renovated first floor opened on May 20, 2016 with a liquor license.

=== BASEMENT ===
BASEMENT opened on May 10, 2019 with a single room in the basement under Knockdown Center. Co-founded by Téa Abashidze, Gega Japaridze, and Tyler Myers, and owned/operated by Knockdown Center. Abashidze and Japaridze's program is tightly and purposefully curated around dark techno. BASEMENT opened a second room called STUDIO on September 2, 2022, expanding the programmatic scope of the venue while maintaining the focus of the main room.
