= Alan Braxe =

French electronic musician (born 1971)

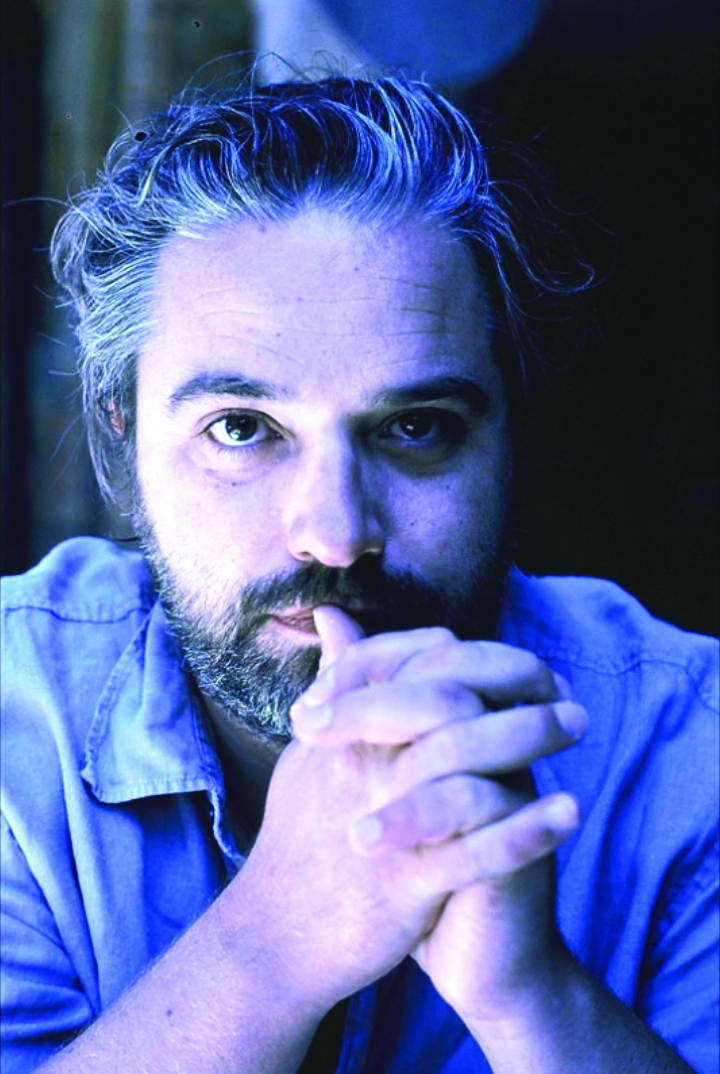
- Braxe in 2019

Background information
- Born: Alain Quême; 9 July 1971 (age 55); Paris, France
- Genres: French house; house; electro
- Years active: 1996–present
- Label: Vulture Music (France)
- Member of: Braxe + Falcon
- Formerly of: Stardust
- Website: alanbraxe.com

Alain Quême (French pronunciation: [alɛ̃ kɛm]; born 9 July 1971), known professionally as Alan Braxe, is a French electronic musician. He is most widely known for his collaborative work with the musicians Fred Falke and Kris Menace, and for being part of the musical trio Stardust. In 2005, he released The Upper Cuts, a collection of his previously released material. He is the cousin of French electronic musician DJ Falcon, with whom he is a member of the French touch duo Braxe + Falcon.

== Biography ==
Alan Braxe started playing the clarinet and cello at an early age. In the late 1980s, he became a DJ in Paris. He started producing his own dance music using only a mixer, a compressor, and an Emu SP1200.

Within a year, Braxe's early demos attracted the attention of Thomas Bangalter, and Braxe's debut single, "Vertigo", was released in 1997 via Bangalter's Roulé label. In 1998, Braxe, Bangalter, and Benjamin Diamond decided to form collaborative project called Stardust, and their single "Music Sounds Better With You", which was released in the same year, was a hit, selling over 3 million copies.

Following this success, Braxe in 1999 inaugurated his own record label, Vulture, releasing collaborations with the DJ and producer Fred Falke. In 2000 alongside Falke he released 'Running - Intro' which is often considered one of the best French Touch tracks ever recorded. He also remixed for a crew of artists both popular and underground – a list that features Beyoncé, Test Icicles, and Ford and Lopatin. Over the next two decades, Braxe's production credits and own releases swelled to nearly 100 titles.

While approaching the 20th anniversary of Stardust's smash success and the Vulture's launch, Braxe stripped his studio of all things digital, and starts to experiment with a Buchla modular synthesizer, echoing his first setup's minimalism, resulting in a more stripped back, simple and sparse analogue electronic sound. This resulted in The Ascent EP, that was released in 2019, with four tracks.

In summer 2021, Alan Braxe, along with Henrik Olsen, released Another Life, under the alias Saudade, on Ministry of Sound Records. The track is produced by Hal Ritson (The Young Punx). The track is a throwback to the French House sounds of the late 90s.

In 2022, DJ Falcon and Alan Braxe debuted new music on a new record label Smugglers Way, an imprint of Domino, that intends to release new and old French house music from the duo and from other artists. In addition to this, the pair announced the two had begun making music as a duo named Braxe + Falcon - with their first single in March, their first EP in August, and a debut solo album intended for release in early 2023. Their debut single features vocals from Panda Bear. A rerelease of Braxe's compilation album The Upper Cuts will release from Smugglers Way in November.

In January 2026, Braxe and Fred Falke announced a 25th-anniversary celebration of their debut collaborative single "Intro." To mark the milestone, the track received its first official remixes, produced by Braxe and Falke themselves. Braxe’s "Hotel Room Edit" and Falke’s cosmic dub remix were included in a remastered package released via Smugglers Way on 20 March 2026. The track's enduring influence was further highlighted by its inclusion in the Paris 2024 Olympic Opening Ceremony and the 2024 tribute track "Dear Alan" by the French duo Justice.

== Discography ==
=== Albums ===
- The Upper Cuts – Alan Braxe, Fred Falke & Friends (2005)
- Vulture Music Mixed by Alan Braxe (2007)
- TBA – Braxe + Falcon (2023)

=== EPs ===
- Moments in Time EP – Alan Braxe with the Spimes (2013)
- The Ascent EP (2019)
- Silence at Sea (Inspired by "The Outlaw Ocean", a Book by Ian Urbina) (2021)
- Step by Step EP – Braxe + Falcon (2022)
- Step by Step Remixes EP (2023)

=== Singles ===
- "Vertigo" (1997)
- Running – "Intro" / "Most Wanted" – Alan Braxe & Fred Falke (2000)
- "Palladium" / "Penthouse Serenade" – Alan Braxe & Fred Falke (2002)
- "Love Lost" – Alan Braxe & Fred Falke (2003)
- Rubicon – "Rubicon" / "Arena" / "Chrystal City" – Alan Braxe & Fred Falke (2004)
- "You'll Stay In My Heart" – Alan Braxe & Fred Falke feat. Savage (2005)
- "Lumberjack" – Alan Braxe & Kris Menace (2007)
- "Addicted" (2008)
- "Nightwatcher (Show Me)" – Alan Braxe feat. Killa Kela & Fallon (2008)
- "One More Chance" – Alan Braxe with The Spimes (2013)
- "Bonus Beat One" (2013)
- "Words" (2019)
- "Step By Step" / "Creative Source" – Braxe + Falcon (2022)
- "All This Love" – Braxe + Falcon feat. Bibio (2024)

=== Remix credits ===
Year	Title	Artist	Album
1998	"Loopduell 1" (Alan Braxe Mix)	Ian Pooley	Non-album single
1998	"I Feel Good Things For You" (Alan Braxe Mix 1)	Daddy's Favourite	Non-album single
1998	"I Feel Good Things For You" (Alan Braxe Mix 2)	Daddy's Favourite	Non-album single
1998	"Alarm Call" (French Dub)	Björk	Homogenic
1998	"Alarm Call" (French Edit)	Björk	Homogenic
1999	"Fall In Love" (Remix)	B.O.C Productions	Non-album single
2000	"In Your Arms" (We Gonna Make It Mix)	Benjamin Diamond	Strange Attitude
2001	"At Night" (Alan Braxe Remix)	Shakedown	You Think You Know
2002	"Anticipating" (Remix by Alan Braxe)	Britney Spears	Britney
2002	"Hypnotize" (Mandrax & Braxe Remix)	Shadow Company	Non-album single
2004	"Miss U Less, See U More" (Alan Braxe Mix)	Faithless	No Roots
2004	"Heartbeat" (Alan Braxe Remix)	Annie	Anniemal
2005	"Number 1" (Alan Braxe & Fred Falke Radio Edit)	Goldfrapp	Supernature
2005	"Let's Get High" (Alan Braxe Remix)	Benjamin Diamond	Out Of Myself
2005	"Black History Month" (Alan Braxe & Fred Falke Remix)	Death from Above 1979	You're a Woman, I'm a Machine
2005	"Only This Moment" (Alan Braxe Remix)	Röyksopp	The Understanding
2006	"What's Your Damage?" (Alan Braxe & Fred Falke Remix)	Test Icicles	For Screening Purposes Only
2006	"Runaway" (Alan Braxe & Fred Falke Remix)	Jamiroquai	High Times: Singles 1992–2006
2006	"That's What Dreams Are Made Of" (Alan Braxe Remix)	Space Cowboy	Digital Rock
2006	"So Far Away" (Alan Braxe Remix)	John Lord Fonda	DeBaSer
2006	"Discopolis" (Alan Braxe Remix)	Lifelike & Kris Menace	Non-album single
2006	"Bossy" (Alan Braxe & Fred Falke Remix)	Kelis feat. Too Short	Kelis Was Here
2006	"Bossy" (Alan Braxe & Fred Falke Earth Out Remix)	Kelis feat. Too Short	Kelis Was Here
2006	"Girl That Speaks No Words" (Alan Braxe And Fred Falke Remix)	Infadels	We Are Not The Infadels
2006	"Kelly" (Alan Braxe & Fred Falke Remix)	Van She	V
2006	"Mona Lisa's Child" (Alan Braxe & Fred Falke Mix)	Keith	Red Thread
2006	"Alright" (Alan Braxe and Fred Falke Remix)	Jamiroquai	Travelling Without Moving
2007	"Lonely Road" (Alan Braxe & Shakedown Mix)	Shakedown	Spellbound
2007	"2 Hearts" (Alan Braxe Remix)	Kylie	X
2007	"D.A.N.C.E." (Alan Braxe And Fred Falke Remix)	Justice	†
2007	"Take It Like a Man" (Alan Braxe & Fred Falke Remix)	Dragonette	Galore
2009	"Life Is Still Beautiful" (Alan Braxe Main Mix)	The Orange Lights	Life Is Still Beautiful
2009	"Life Is Still Beautiful" (Alan Braxe Dub)	The Orange Lights	Life Is Still Beautiful
2009	"The Cult Of Romance" (Alan Braxe Remix)	Fenech Soler	Non-album single
2009	"Broken-Hearted Girl" (Alan Braxe Remix)	Beyoncé	I Am... Sasha Fierce
2009	"Broken-Hearted Girl" (Alan Braxe Dub)	Beyoncé	I Am... Sasha Fierce
2010	"White Knuckle Ride" (Alex Braxe Remix)	Jamiroquai	Rock Dust Light Star
2010	"The Writer" (Alan Braxe Remix)	Ellie Goulding	Lights
2010	"Los Feeling" (Alan Braxe Remix)	Visitor	Non-album single
2010	"Narcissus" (Alan Braxe Remix)	Pacific!	Narcissus
2011	"X Girl" (Alan Braxe Remix)	Teenage Bad Girl	Backwash
2011	"Jona Vark" (Alan Braxe Remix)	Gypsy & The Cat	Gilgamesh
2011	"By My Side" (Remix By Alan Braxe)	Twin Twin	Vive la vie
2011	"Too Much MIDI (Please Forgive Me)" (Alan Braxe Remix)	Ford & Lopatin	Channel Pressure Remixes
2011	"Too Much MIDI (Please Forgive Me)" (Alan Braxe Bonus Remix)	Ford & Lopatin	Channel Pressure Remixes
2013	"Sheila" (Alan Braxe Remix)	Memory Tapes	Grace / Confusion
2013	"In Alpha" (Alan Braxe Remix)	I:Cube	In Alpha EP
2013	"Fall" (Alan Braxe Remix)	The Presets	Pacifica
2013	"Evil Eye" (Alan Braxe Remix)	Franz Ferdinand	Right Thoughts, Right Words, Right Action
2013	"Evil Eye" (Alan Braxe Remix)	Franz Ferdinand	Right Thoughts, Right Words, Right Action
2014	"An Open Heart" (Alan Braxe Remix)	Bright Light Bright Light	Life Is Easy
2014	"Overdrive" (Alan Braxe Remix)	Lifelike	Non-album single
2015	"Here I Am" (Braxe Remix)	Tom Odell	Wrong Crowd
2015	"Music Of Life" (Alan Braxe Remix)	Cerrone	The Golden Touch (Cerrone IV)
2015	"Supernature" (Alan Braxe Mix)	Cerrone	Supernature (Cerrone III)
2016	"Slow Love" (Alan Braxe Remix)	Gigamesh	Time Travel
2018	"Les Oxalis" (Alan Braxe Remix)	Charlotte Gainsbourg	Rest
2021	"In Love With You" (Alan Braxe Remix)	The Paradise	Non-album single
2022	"Bubble Guts" (Braxe + Falcon Remix)	A-Trak	Non-album single
2022	"Eleanor" (Braxe + Falcon Remix)	Hot Chip	Freakout/Release
2022	"Good Times" (Braxe + Falcon Remix)	Jungle	Non-album single
2023	"Winter Solstice" (Braxe + Falcon Remix)	Phoenix	Alpha Zulu
2025	"Mannequin Love" (Braxe + Falcon Remix)	Justice	Hyperdrama

=== Other songs ===
Title	Title	Artist	Album
1998	"Music Sounds Better with You"	Stardust	Non-album single
2003	"In Love With You"	The Paradise	Non-album single
2004	"Horizon"	Alan Braxe & Fred Falke	Rubicon (DVD-Video Version)
2005	"Defender" / "Bliss"	Defender	Non-album single
2007	"Automatic"	Alan Braxe & Fred Falke	Vulture Music Mixed By Alan Braxe
2007	"Haze"	Alan Braxe	Vulture Music Mixed By Alan Braxe
2021	"Another Life"	Saudade	Non-album single

==== Other appearances ====
Year	Title	Artist	Album
2000	"Read In Your Mind"	Benjamin Diamond	Strange Attitude
2009	"Sunset"	Lifelike	Non-album single
2016	"So Much It Hurts" / "You Stole My Heart Away" / "You Want The Sun" / "Play It On My Radio" / "Lost UB" / "Miami Beach" / "Pretty Babies" / "Empires" / "Sister Brother Mother Father"	Niki & The Dove	Everybody's Heart Is Broken Now
2016	"Red Lips"	Cerrone	Red Lips
