= Roulé =

Former French record label

- Logo featuring a roulette table
- Founded: 1995
- Founder: Thomas Bangalter
- Defunct: 2018
- Status: Liquidated
- Distributor: Funkytown Distribution
- Genre: House; nu-disco; techno
- Country of origin: France
- Location: Paris

Roulé (French: [ʁule], lit. 'rolled') was a French record label founded in 1995 by former Daft Punk member Thomas Bangalter. Roulé had a side label entitled Scratché ([skʁatʃe], lit. 'scratched') which released only one record, produced by the Buffalo Bunch (Paul de Homem-Christo and Romain Séo). Roulé was liquidated in 2018.

== History ==
=== 1995–1998: Beginnings ===
In 1995, Bangalter released Trax On Da Rocks, the first EP and release on the label. The EP includes "What To Do," which would be included in the 2018 film Climax.

In 1997, Alan Braxe released "Vertigo" after meeting Bangalter in a night club, which included a remix by Bangalter called the "Virgo Edit." One year after, Roy Davis Jr. released "Rock Shock," which included another remix by Bangalter called the "Start-Stop Mix."

=== 1998–2003: "Music Sounds Better With You" and hiatus ===
After the release of "Vertigo," Braxe performed at the Rex Club in Paris, with Bangalter on keyboards and Braxe's friend Benjamin Diamond on vocals. They composed the first version of "Music Sounds Better with You" for the performance, using a looped sample from the 1981 Chaka Khan song "Fate," sampled using an E-mu SP-1200. After polishing the track, "Music Sounds Better with You" was released in 1998, spending two weeks on the Billboard Dance Club Songs chart at number 1.

That same year, Bangalter released Trax On Da Rocks Vol. 2, which peaked at 83 for two weeks on the Official Singles Chart Top 100.

In 1999, Romanthony released "Hold On," which was previously released on his label Black Male Records in 1994. The Roulé version includes two remixes different from the Black Male version.

=== 2012–2018: Later developments and liquidation ===
In 2012, Trax On Da Rocks and other releases were reissued, reviving the label for a short period of time.

In December 2018, Roulé was liquidated by Bangalter.

After Daft Punk split, Bangalter created a new label named Alberts & Gothmaan (an anagram of Thomas Bangalter) for his solo project.

== Legacy ==
Roulé has been described as an influential French house label that would "captivate an audience for the rest of time," with releases that "stands among house music’s most infectious."

Although the label was founded in 1995 and released several EPs, Roulé has only released one long player: the Irréversible soundtrack. In an interview, Bangalter once stated:

Roulé’s never really been a “label.” It’s been more of an outlet where there’s a record every year or so. I’ve never made plans for it, and I never will. It’s just something that is there. I know for Guy-Manuel, Crydamoure is more of a label.

== Artists ==
- Thomas Bangalter
- Alan Braxe
- Roy Davis Jr.
- Stardust
- Romanthony
- DJ Falcon
- Together

== Discography ==
- Roulé 301: Thomas Bangalter – Trax on Da Rocks – On Da Rocks / Roulé Boulé / What to Do / Outrun / Ventura [1995]
- Roulé 302: Thomas Bangalter – Spinal Scratch – Spinal Scratch / Spinal Beats [1996]
- Roulé 303: Alan Braxe – Vertigo – Vertigo / Vertigo (Virgo Edit) [1997]
- Roulé 304: Roy Davis Jr. – Rock Shock – Rock Shock / Rock Shock (Thomas Bangalter's Start-Stop Mix) [1998]
- Roulé 305: Stardust – Music Sounds Better with You [1998]
  - Roulé 305 RMX: Stardust – Music Sounds Better with You Remixes – Bibi & Dimitri Anthem from Paris Mix / DJ Sneak's 32 on Red Dub Mix / Chateau Flight Remix / DJ Sneak's 32 on Red Mix [1998]
- Roulé 306: Thomas Bangalter – Trax on Da Rocks Vol. 2 – Club Soda / Extra Dry / Shuffle! / Colossus / Turbo [1998]
- Roulé 307: Romanthony – Hold On – Classic Vocal / R&B Vocal / Got a Grip Dubb [1999]
- Roulé 308: DJ Falcon – Hello My Name Is DJ Falcon – First / Honeymoon / Untitled / Unplugged [1999]
- Roulé 309: Thomas Bangalter – Outrage – Outrage / Night Beats / Paris by Night [2003]

=== Together ===
Together was a collaboration between DJ Falcon and Thomas Bangalter, and only released two singles:

- TOGETHER: Together – Together [2000]
- TOGETHER 2: Together – So Much Love to Give [2002]

=== Scratché ===
- Scratché 701: The Buffalo Bunch – Buffalo Club – Buffalo Club / Buffalo Beats [1998]

=== Albums ===
Roulé LP 01: Irréversible (Original Soundtrack from the Motion Picture) [2002]

== See also ==
- Crydamoure
- List of record labels
