= Music Sounds Better with You =

1998 single by Stardust

Single by Stardust
- Released: 20 July 1998
- Studio: Daft House (Paris)
- Genre: French house
- Length: 6:48; 4:20 (radio edit)
- Label: Roulé; Virgin; Because
- Songwriters: Thomas Bangalter; Alain Quême; Benjamin Diamond; Dominic King; Frank Musker
- Producers: Thomas Bangalter; Alan Braxe; Benjamin Diamond

Audio sample
- file; help

Music video
- "Music Sounds Better with You" on YouTube

"Music Sounds Better with You" is the only song by the French house trio Stardust, released on 20 July 1998. Stardust was composed of the Daft Punk member Thomas Bangalter, the DJ Alan Braxe, and the vocalist Benjamin Diamond.

Stardust formed for a performance at the Rex Club in Paris. They wrote "Music Sounds Better with You" using a guitar riff sampled from the 1981 Chaka Khan song "Fate". It was initially released on Bangalter's Roulé label, followed by a wider release on Virgin Records, with a music video directed by Michel Gondry.

"Music Sounds Better with You" reached number ten on the French Singles Chart, number one in Greece and Spain, and the top ten in Australia, Canada, Ireland and New Zealand. It reached number two on the UK singles chart, becoming Britain's 11th best-selling single of 1998. It also topped the US Billboard Dance Club Play chart for two weeks. It is certified double platinum in the UK, platinum in Australia, and gold in Belgium and France. By 2018, it had sold more than two million copies worldwide.

"Music Sounds Better with You" received acclaim and was named one of the greatest dance songs by several publications. Stardust performed once more, at a festival in France, before disbanding. Bangalter declined an offer of $3 million from Virgin to produce a Stardust album.

== Background ==
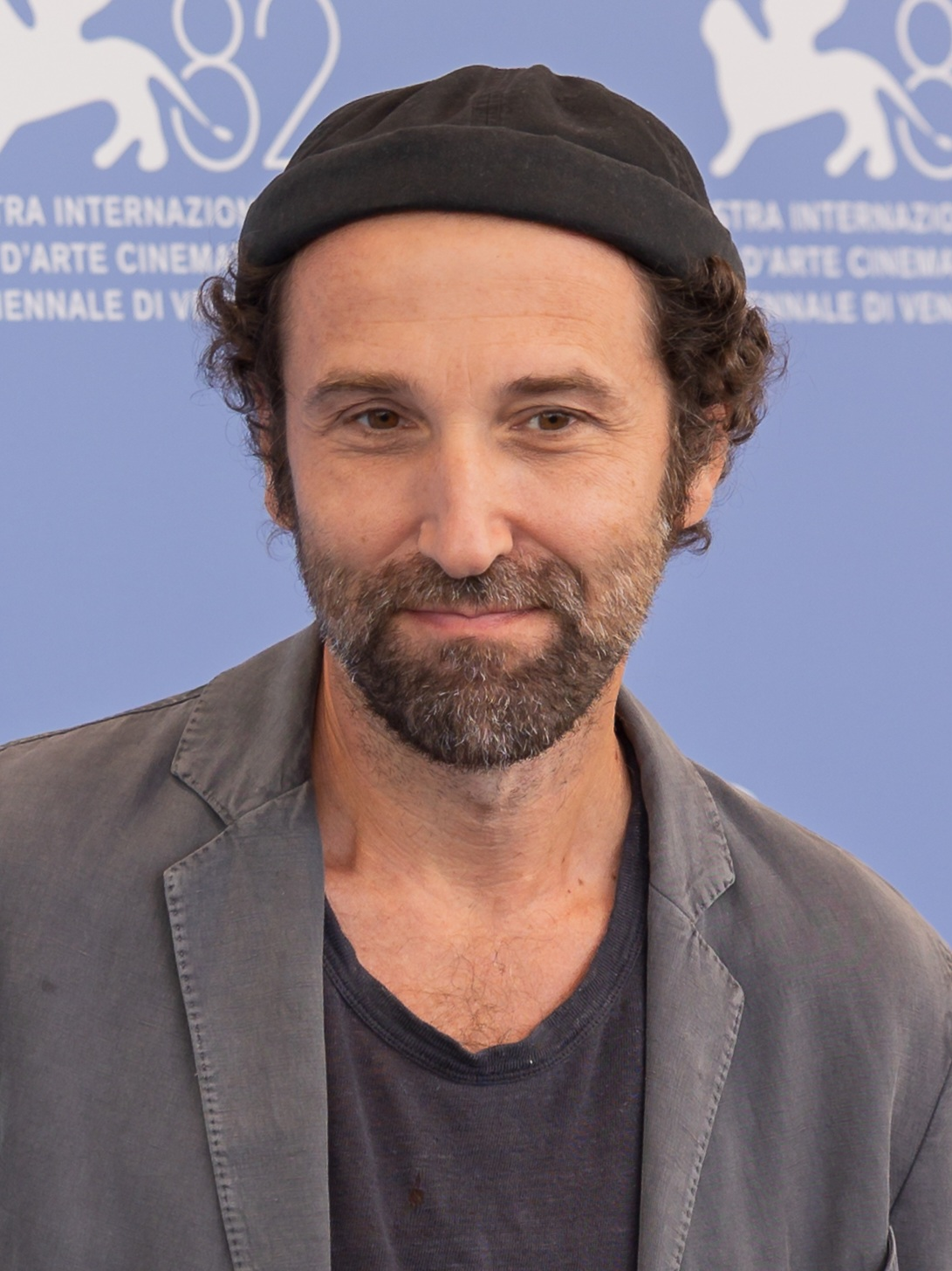
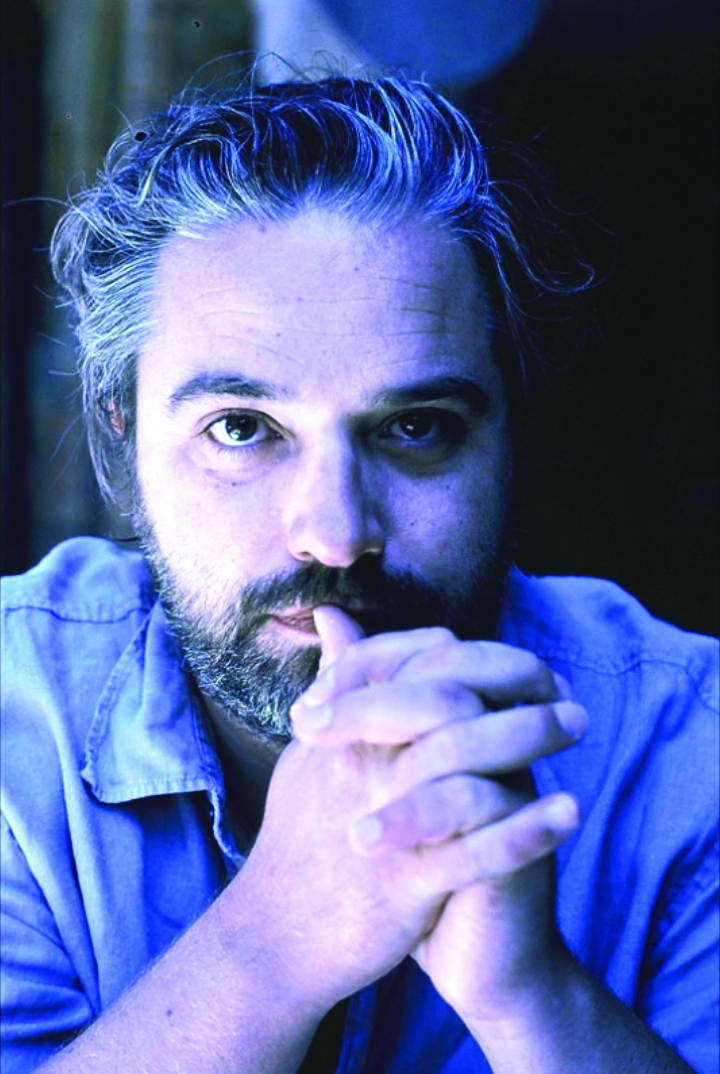
Thomas Bangalter (left) and Alan Braxe

By the late 1980s, house and techno had become popular in gay nightclubs in Chicago and Detroit. In France, the DJ Alan Braxe and the singer Benjamin Diamond met in boarding school and bonded over music as teenagers. When house music became popular in the French gay scene, they bought every house LP they could find, went clubbing and attended raves.

By the early 1990s, Braxe had dropped out of university and completed a year of military conscription. With no job prospects, he decided to pursue music. He met Thomas Bangalter, a member of the electronic duo Daft Punk, in a nightclub, and later gave him a demo of his track "Vertigo". Bangalter released it on his label, Roulé, in 1997.

After the release of "Vertigo", Braxe performed at the Rex Club in Paris, with Bangalter on keyboards and Diamond on vocals. While rehearsing, the group needed one more track to complete the set. Braxe said they wanted to write a song rather than a "pure club track". They composed the first version of "Music Sounds Better with You" using a looped sample from the 1981 Chaka Khan song "Fate", sampled using an E-mu SP-1200. At the time, Diamond was the singer in a punk band. (Note: Sources differ on Diamond's original career. Billboard says he worked in the film industry and sang in a funk and soul band; NME said he sang in the punk band Chicken Pox and The Guardian also says he sang in a punk band.) He left the band when they expressed contempt for his collaboration with electronic musicians, telling him to "go back to see your Daft Punk friends and forget us".

== Recording ==
After the Rex Club performance, Stardust worked on "Music Sounds Better with You" at Bangalter's home studio, Daft House, for six days. They arranged it using a Rhodes piano, a Roland TR-909 drum machine, a bassline recorded on a Korg Trident, and an Ensoniq ASR-10 sampling keyboard, triggering different sections by assigning them to different keys. Diamond's vocals and the final track were compressed with an Alesis 3630. Diamond disliked his vocals at first, but Bangalter and Braxe felt they were perfect.

The lyrics were written by all three members. They wrote more lyrics, but failed to find a way to arrange them and pared the song down to its final form. Diamond felt the final lyrics were "like a mantra ... something everyone could understand". Braxe said they were happy with the finished song, feeling they had created something original. He described its repetition and simplicity as "a balance between getting bored and not bored".

== Release ==
"Music Sounds Better with You" was released as a vinyl single on Bangalter's label Roulé in early 1998. According to Braxe, it initially confused Paris clubgoers. The single was intended for DJs, but demand grew after copies were distributed at the 1998 Miami Winter Music Conference. According to the Roulé co-manager Gildas Loaec, the BBC Radio 1 DJ Pete Tong was the first radio DJ to play the song. Loaec and Diamond said "Music Sounds Better with You" sold between 250,000 and 400,000 copies on Roulé.

Stardust signed the single to Virgin Records. On 10 August 1998, Virgin released it as a CD and cassette in the UK. Prior to its UK release, it became the first French import single to appear on the UK singles chart, peaking at number 55 on 9 August. The official British release reached number two on the UK singles chart for two weeks and became the year's 11th-best-selling single. Bangalter did not enjoy the pressure and attention brought by the success, as he had intended Roulé as a hobby and creative platform. Diamond realised how popular the song had become when he heard it while on holiday in Italy, and found the attention overwhelming.

In the US, "Music Sounds Better with You" was serviced to rhythmic contemporary and contemporary hit radio on 15 September, followed by a commercial release on 22 September. It topped the Billboard Dance Club Play chart for two weeks and reached number 62 on the Billboard Hot 100. In Canada, it was released on 6 October, reaching number two on the Canadian Singles Chart and number five on the RPM Dance chart. It reached number one in Greece and Spain and the top 10 in at least nine other countries. It is certified double platinum in the UK, platinum in Australia, and gold in Belgium and France. As of 2018, it had sold more than two million copies worldwide.

== Music video ==
The music video for "Music Sounds Better with You" was directed by Michel Gondry and filmed in Los Angeles. In the video, a young boy constructs a model glider over several days while the members of Stardust perform on television, with Bangalter and Braxe wearing metallic masks and Diamond's face painted silver. Braxe described the video as "heart-warming and nostalgic but [with] a hint of melancholy", which he said was a crucial element of dance music. Bruce Tantum of DJ Mag described the video as "charming" and "dreamy". The Insomniac journalist Jonny Coleman wrote that it "helps reinforce the notion that this whole Stardust concept is supposed to exist in some other familiar but foreign liminal space, something ghostly but still warm and inviting".

== Critical reception ==
Professional ratings
Review scores
Source	Rating
AllMusic	4.5/5 stars

"Music Sounds Better with You" received acclaim. John Bush from AllMusic described it as "one of the most irresistible, sublime dance singles of the decade". Larry Flick of Billboard described it as a "euro-splashed ditty" with "an infectious li'l hook and a solid, old-school disco bassline ... its execution makes it pop with a refreshing energy". Another Billboard editor, Annabel Ross, called it "sublime in its simplicity" and one of the best dance songs. Slant Magazine called it "an exhilarating hit of dance-floor cocaine", praising its instrumentation and lyrics.

In Pitchfork, Andy Battaglia wrote that "Music Sounds Better with You" demonstrated the similarities between disco and Daft Punk. He praised the "gliding" guitar figure, the "earworm" bassline and the "lascivious" vocals. Bruce Tantum wrote in DJ Mag that it "doesn't do much of anything, really, nor does it have to. It exists in a state of pleasure-giving perfection." Vice's Josh Baines called it the "absolute papa of French touch ... one of the most genuinely transcendental records ever committed to wax". He said its "lazy" use of the Chaka Khan sample was "a flippant middle finger raised to anyone who rates originality over impact". The BBC described it as "four minutes of French funk built upon a brutally efficient four-bar loop that became the signature sound of summer 1998".

=== Accolades ===
In 2013, Mixmag named "Music Sounds Better with You" the sixth-greatest dance song. In 2015, LA Weekly ranked it the ninth-best dance track in history. In 2018, Mixmag included it in its list of the best vocal house anthems, and in 2019 listed it among the 15 best house tracks about love. Pitchfork ranked it the 46th-best song of the 90s and included it in The Pitchfork 500, a book compiling the greatest songs from 1977 to 2008. In 2011, Slant Magazine named "Music Sounds Better with You" the 99th-best single of the 90s, and in 2012 Porcys ranked it the greatest.

In 2017, BuzzFeed named it the 72nd-greatest dance song of the 90s. In 2020, NME named it one of the best house songs, Mixmag readers named its bassline one of the best in dance music, and Red Bull included it on their list of "underrated dance songs from the 1990s that still sound amazing". In 2022, Pitchfork named "Music Sounds Better with You" one of the best house tracks of the 90s, Rolling Stone named it the 73rd-greatest dance track and Classic Pop named it the eighth-best 1990s dance song. In 2023, Billboard ranked it the 15th-best EDM love song. In 2024, The Guardian named it the third-best French touch track. In 2025, Billboard ranked "Music Sounds Better with You" the sixth-best dance song and sixth-best house song of all time.

== Legacy ==
According to Billboard, after the success of "Music Sounds Better with You", Virgin offered Bangalter $3 million to produce a Stardust album. The group created several demos, but abandoned them and declined the offer. In 2012, Braxe said there were no plans to release the demos, saying it gave the record "a certain magic and mystery". In another interview, he said "what happened with the song was really amazing, and we wanted to leave it like that". Diamond said he had wanted to continue with Stardust, but Bangalter was focused on Daft Punk. Apart from their performance at Rex Club, Stardust performed only once, in a 30-minute set at the Borealis festival in Montpellier, France.

Diamond and Braxe resumed their solo careers. Diamond said he found it difficult to return to his own style of music, and his record company, Sony, pressured him to release similar music to Stardust. Bangalter continued to release music as Daft Punk with Guy-Manuel de Homem-Christo. On their 2006—2007 tour, they performed a mashup of "Music Sounds Better with You" and their 2000 single "One More Time". A performance was included on the bonus disc of the live album Alive 2007, which Pitchfork described as "a combination so 'holy shit' ecstatic it would seem downright cocky if it wasn't so blissful".

In 2011, Big Time Rush interpolated "Music Sounds Better with You" for their track "Music Sounds Better with U". It was used in the 2013 video game Grand Theft Auto V, and was covered that year in a live show by the xx and Jessie Ware mashed-up with Modjo's "Lady". In 2018, Stardust remastered "Music Sounds Better with You" for its 20th anniversary. It was reissued by the record label Because Music and added to streaming platforms. It was also included on Braxe's 2005 compilation album The Upper Cuts, which was reissued in 2023. A 2017 cover by Neil Frances was certified platinum in Australia in 2024. It was played during the opening ceremony of the 2024 Summer Olympics. In 2024, Blossoms and Rick Astley interpolated the song during a cover of "360" by Charli XCX for Live Lounge.

== Personnel ==
Stardust

- Thomas Bangalter – programming, mixing
- Alan Braxe – programming, mixing
- Benjamin Diamond – vocals, programming

== Charts ==
=== Weekly charts ===
Weekly chart performance for "Music Sounds Better with You"
Chart (1998)	Peak position
Australia (ARIA)	4
Austria (Ö3 Austria Top 40)	24
Belgium (Ultratop 50 Flanders)	18
Belgium (Ultratop 50 Wallonia)	12
Canada (Nielsen SoundScan)	2
Canada Dance/Urban (RPM)	5
Denmark (IFPI)	17
Europe (Eurochart Hot 100)	5
Finland (Suomen virallinen lista)	12
France (SNEP)	10
Germany (GfK)	26
Greece (IFPI)	1
Iceland (Íslenski Listinn Topp 40)	4
Ireland (IRMA)	5
Italy (Musica e dischi)	2
Italy Airplay (Music & Media)	7
Netherlands (Dutch Top 40)	17
Netherlands (Single Top 100)	15
New Zealand (Recorded Music NZ)	8
Norway (VG-lista)	14
Scottish Singles Sales (Official Charts)	2
Spain (AFYVE)	1
Sweden (Sverigetopplistan)	27
Switzerland (Schweizer Hitparade)	7
UK Singles (Official Charts)	2
US Billboard Hot 100	62
US Dance Club Songs (Billboard)	1
US Dance Singles Sales (Billboard)	2

=== Year-end charts ===
1998 year-end chart performance for "Music Sounds Better with You"
Chart (1998)	Position
Australia (ARIA)	36
Belgium (Ultratop 50 Flanders)	94
Belgium (Ultratop 50 Wallonia)	76
Canada Dance (RPM)	15
Europe (Eurochart Hot 100)	30
Europe (Radio Top 50)	25
Europe Border Breakers (Music & Media)	6
France (SNEP)	30
Iceland (Íslenski Listinn Topp 40)	77
Netherlands (Dutch Top 40)	60
Netherlands (Single Top 100)	74
Sweden (Hitlistan)	100
Switzerland (Schweizer Hitparade)	48
UK Singles (OCC)	11
US Dance Club Play (Billboard)	2
US Maxi-Singles Sales (Billboard)	23

1999 year-end chart performance for "Music Sounds Better with You"
Chart (1999)	Position
UK Airplay (Music Week)	37
US Maxi-Singles Sales (Billboard)	12

== Sales and certifications ==
Sales and certifications for "Music Sounds Better with You"
Region	Certification	Certified units/sales
Australia (ARIA)	Platinum	70,000^{^}
Belgium (BRMA)	Gold	25,000^{*}
France (SNEP)	Gold	250,000^{*}
New Zealand (RMNZ)	2× Platinum	60,000^{‡}
United Kingdom (BPI)	3× Platinum	1,800,000^{‡}
United States (RIAA)	Platinum	1,000,000^{‡}
Summaries
Worldwide	—	2,000,000
^{*} Sales figures based on certification alone.^{^} Shipments figures based on certification alone.^{‡} Sales+streaming figures based on certification alone.

== See also ==
- List of artists who reached number one on the U.S. dance chart
- Just the Way You Are (Milky song), using a sample in David Guetta remix
