= French house =

Subgenre of house music

- Stylistic origins: House; disco house; tech house; disco; space disco; Eurodisco
- Cultural origins: Early- to mid-1990s, France
- Derivative forms: Nu-disco; synthwave; electro house

Fusion genres
- French electro

Other topics
- Nu-disco; funky house; future funk

French house sample

French house (also referred to as French touch, filter house, or tekfunk) is a style of house music devised by French musicians in the 1990s. It is a form of Eurodisco and a popular strand of the late 1990s and 2000s European dance music scene. The defining characteristics of the genre are filter and phaser effects both on and alongside samples from late 1970s and early 1980s European disco tracks. Tracks sometimes contained original hooks inspired by these samples, providing thicker harmonic foundations than the genre's forerunners. Most tracks in this style are in 4/4 time and feature steady four-on-the-floor beats in the tempo range of 110–130 beats per minute. French house acts include Pépé Bradock, Daft Punk, David Guetta, Bob Sinclar, Martin Solveig, Cassius, the Micronauts, the Supermen Lovers, Modjo, Justice, Air, and Étienne de Crécy.

== History and influences ==
French house was influenced by American dance music, Euro disco, and the space disco music styles. Space disco was popular in France during the late 1970s and early 1980s, especially with artists such as Cerrone and Sheila and B. Devotion. American P-Funk also influenced the genre's sound, especially the work of George Clinton and Bootsy Collins. P-Funk was played alongside disco in many French discothèques, notably after Disco Demolition Night took place in the United States. The Jacking aspect of Chicago house was also incorporated into the French house scene with "jack house" becoming a short-lived descriptive term for the sound in the UK. The influence of 1970s French pop music, championed by musicians such as François de Roubaix, Jean-Michel Jarre, and Serge Gainsbourg, is also apparent within the genre.

Thomas Bangalter's tracks for his Roulé label were some of the earliest examples of French house. His solo material, along with his work as a member of Daft Punk and Stardust, influenced the French house scene during the mid-to-late 1990s. The French duo Motorbass were among the first in France to produce house tracks largely based around samples and filtered loops and released their seminal album, Pansoul in 1996. Parisian producer St. Germain also produced jazz-inspired house tracks. Other known French producers during this time period, such as François Kevorkian and Laurent Garnier, remained distant from the emerging French house label.

UK dance music and European DJs first recognized French house experiments in the mid-1990s with commercial success occurring in 1997. Daft Punk, Cassius and later Stardust were the first internationally successful artists of the genre, and along with Air, signed to Virgin Records. Initial releases by all three garnered music videos directed by Spike Jonze, Michel Gondry and Alex & Martin. Thanks to a growing awareness of the clubbing scene, along with major label support, Daft Punk's debut album Homework entered the top 10 of the UK Albums Chart upon its release. The duo would ultimately become the biggest-selling French act in the UK since Jean-Michel Jarre. The emergence of the French sound coincided with dance music's popularity in the UK market, which was also experiencing a surge of interest in general electronic music.

Further international commercial success continued into the 2000s with Bob Sinclar, Étienne de Crécy, Benjamin Diamond, and Modjo achieving hit singles in Europe. In late 2005, Madonna released Confessions on a Dance Floor, an album with significant French house influences in several of its songs.

== Terms, origins and variations ==
The term "French Touch" was first used in Paris in July 1987. Jean-Claude Lagrèze, a photographer of parisians' nights created a couple of "French Touch" parties at The Palace in an effort to help people discover house music. The parties were driven by DJ Laurent Garnier, Guillaume la Tortue and David Guetta. The expression "We Give a French Touch to House" was printed on a bomber jacket by Éric Morand for Fnac Music Dance Division in 1991.

Prior to 1996, "French house" had been referred to among Europeans as "nu-disco", "disco house" and "new disco". The term "French touch" was popularised by music journalist Martin James in the weekly music paper known as Melody Maker. He referred to the term in 1996 as a review of Étienne de Crécy's first album Super Discount. This term became favoured among the French media and was then widely used in the UK press by 1998. The French newspaper, Liberation and Radio NRJ acknowledged Martin James as the coiner of the "French Touch". The term was then used on an MTV News special, to describe a "French house explosion" phenomenon. Bob Sinclar was interviewed, as well as Air (a non-house act) and Cassius. This news special later aired on all MTV local variations worldwide, spreading the term and introducing the "French house" sound to the mainstream population.

Between 1998 and 2001, local music shop Discobole Records imported the records directly from France and middle class clubs dedicated totally to the genre, such as City Groove. In Greece, this music style was promoted as "disco house". During 1999, many events also took place on Spain's Ibiza island, and has continued to be a very popular destination for British tourists.

French house can be described as a combination of three production styles. One is what the French refer to as 'French house' or 'French Touch,' heavily influenced by the space disco sound. The second style is a continuation and update of Euro disco, drawing inspiration from the productions of Alec R. Costandinos. The third style embodies the deep American house influence, evident in the similar treatment of samples and repetitive 'funky' hooks. Further variations and mutations naturally followed.

French house initially maintained the established 'French Touch' sound, emphasizing Euro disco-like vocals and downplaying the 'space disco' themes. However, over time, most successful acts have evolved their sound. For instance, Bob Sinclar's later work, including the hit single 'World, Hold On (Children of the Sky),' exhibits only a distant connection to the original French house sound. Similarly, both Daft Punk and Étienne de Crécy developed a harder synthetic sound more directly inspired by techno, electro, and pop.

== Record labels associated with the style ==
- 20000st
- Astralwerks (U.S. market)
- Barclay (record label)
- BASE Records
- Bromance
- Chat Boutique Records
- Crydamoure
- Diamond Traxx
- Disques Solid
- Dynamic Recordings
- Ed Banger Records
- F Communications
- Fiat Lux
- Live Saver Records
- Kitsuné
- Moveltraxx
- Pont Neuf Records
- Pro-Zak Trax
- Record Makers
- Roche Musique
- Roulé
- Smugglers Way
- Versatile Records
- Vulture Music
- We Rock Music
- Work It Baby
