= Mirage (ballet) =

Contemporary ballet art by Kōhei Nawa, Damien Jalet, and Thomas Bangalter

- Choreographer: Damien Jalet
- Music: Thomas Bangalter
- Premiere: May 2025; Grand Théâtre de Genève
- Original ballet company: Ballet du Grand Théâtre de Genève
- Design: Kōhei Nawa

Mirage is a 2025 ballet created by Belgian-French choreographer choreographer Damien Jalet, Japanese designer and sculptor Kōhei Nawa, and French composer Thomas Bangalter. The contemporary ballet premiered in full at the Grand Théâtre de Genève in May 2025, with international touring following its premiere.

== Conception ==
Mirage is the fourth collaboration between Jalet and Nawa and was inspired by optical illusions of Fata Morgana. The ballet, designed for 16 dancers, initially made its debut in 2024 with a limited preview titled Mirage [transitory], before being premiered in full in May 2025 in Geneva, Switzerland. Costumes for the ballet were created by Kunihiko Morinaga, lead fashion designer of Anrealage.

Jalet and Bangalter previously collaborated alongside French artist JR on the 2023 art installation Chiroptera, in which 150 dancers performed to the public on a cavernous structure built outside the Place de l'Opéra in Paris. Following this collaboration, Jalet asked Bangalter about working on another project together. Bangalter said Jalet and Nawa's collaboration was akin to movie special effects shops, working "at the margin between performance art and art installation and choreography."

== Music ==
Mirage - Ballet for 16 Dancers

Soundtrack album by Thomas Bangalter
- Released: 5 June 2026
- Recorded: 2024
- Genre: Classical, minimalism
- Length: 50:00
- Label: Erato
- Producer: Thomas Bangalter

Thomas Bangalter chronology
Chiroptera (2024)	Mirage - Ballet for 16 Dancers (2026)

Singles from Mirage
- 1. "Mirage: Part II" Released: 24 April 2026

The original music for the ballet was composed by Thomas Bangalter, formerly of electronic duo Daft Punk. Bangalter's first project following the duo's split had been his first ballet composition Mythologies, choreographed by Angelin Preljocaj, in 2022.

Unlike Mythologies, which has no electronic instruments and is a fully orchestral classical composition, Mirage is electronic and minimalist, with the music following the "changing states" of the ballet. Bangalter stated that he wanted to return to electronic music after Mythologies as long as it was "instinctive," saying that he had enjoyed composing to ballets rather than for symphonies because "a ballet is still at the service of a ritualistic urge of coming together."

All instruments on the album are performed by Bangalter, with the works of Greek-French composer Iannis Xenakis being cited as a major inspiration for the composition. Bangalter used a graphics tablet while creating the music and relied heavily on spontaneity while using it. He said he tried to blur the lines between where sound ends and music begins. Bangalter said he focused on creating "texture, right on the edge between the electronic and the acoustic: sounds where you can’t quite tell how they were generated, or where they come from."

The album was released on vinyl, CD, and streaming, as well as a limited Revox Tape edition, on 5 June 2026. The second part of the composition was released as a single alongside the album's announcement in April 2026. The album was released the same week as Bangalter's follow-up collaboration with JR, La Caverne du Pont Neuf, which consists of converting the Pont Neuf in Paris into a cavernous structure. Bangalter compared Mirage and La Caverne du Pont Neuf, saying that both have focuses on sounds that reflect temporality.

All music is composed by Thomas Bangalter.

No.	Title	Length
1.	"Mirage: Part I"	12:42
2.	"Mirage: Part II"	9:57
3.	"Mirage: Part III"	2:42
4.	"Mirage: Part IV"	7:47
5.	"Mirage: Part V"	2:49
6.	"Mirage: Part VI"	6:06
7.	"Mirage: Part VII"	5:00
8.	"Mirage: Part VIII"	2:58
Total length:		50:00

=== Personnel ===
- Thomas Bangalter - composition, production, all instruments
- Florian Lagatta - mixing, mastering
- Cédric Hervet - art design, layout
- Rahi Rezvani - cover art

=== Charts ===
Chart performance for Mirage - Ballet for 16 Dancers
Chart (2026)	Peak position
French Albums (SNEP)	194
French Classical Albums (SNEP)	2
Swedish Classical Albums (Sverigetopplistan)	5
UK Classical Albums (OCC)	11
UK Classical Artist Albums (OCC)	46
US Top Classical Albums (Billboard)	21

== Reception ==
The ballet was praised by French magazines Transfuge and ResMusica. The Institute of Contemporary Arts Kyoto praised the early version of the ballet in 2024. Bangalter's single "Mirage: Part II" was included on The Fader's "Songs You Need In Your Life This Week" the week of its release, saying patience is rewarded to the listener as the track "builds to a thundering frenzy."
