= Cédric Hervet =

French art director, designer, musician, and record producer

- Born: 30 April 1974 (age 52); France
- Occupations: Art director; musician; producer; furniture design; manufacturing
- Years active: 2000–present
- Website: hervet-manufacturier.com

Cédric Hervet (born 30 April 1974) is a French art director, designer, musician, and record producer. He has worked as Daft Punk's creative director throughout the band's career (1993–2021).

He and his cousin Nicolas run Hervet Manufacturier, a French furniture and decorative object manufacturer.

== Career ==
Hervet met both Thomas Bangalter and Guy-Manuel de Homem-Christo of Daft Punk in Paris while they were in high school. Hervet later attended the art school École Boulle. Hervet helped with the art direction of the band's tours, televised live performances, and co-wrote the films Interstella 5555: The 5tory of the 5ecret 5tar 5ystem and Electroma with the duo, working as the film editor on the latter. He was a co-producer on the album Human After All, having also helped with the art direction and cover art for nearly all of the duo's major releases. Hervet is similar to Bangalter and Homem-Christo in approach to publicity and celebrity-life, often working behind the scenes and not doing many interviews or public appearances.

Since Daft Punk's split in 2021, Hervet has collaborated with the duo on various solo projects and supervised many of their post-split releases. Hervet oversaw the remaster of Interstella 5555 when the film was globally released in theaters for the first time in 2024. The film was remastered using generative artificial intelligence, which garnered some criticism. Hervet stated that the use of AI was a result of the original animation cells not being preserved and of various issues with framerate due to encoding switches between PAL and NTSC at the time of production. Hervet attended multiple premieres of the remastered film, including showings in Los Angeles and at Tribeca Film Festival, speaking in panels on behalf of the production team. In September 2025, Hervet, as a part of Daft Life, worked with Epic Games on a "Daft Punk Experience" for the online video game Fortnite, celebrating the legacy of the duo. In June 2026, Hervet and Bangalter participated in a live Q&A after a 4K reshowing of Electroma premiere at Tribeca Festival for the film's 20th anniversary.

Hervet and his cousin's company, Hervet Manufacturier, design and create furniture and decorative objects. These projects have sometimes intersected with the work of Daft Punk. Bangalter has done promotional photography for the company and some of Hervet Manufacturier's work have become official merchandise for the group. Furniture from Hervet Manufacturier has been used in Daft Punk videos and were included in the "Daft Punk Experience" in Fortnite.

== Notable work ==
- Discovery (2001) – concept, art direction
- Irréversible (2002) – consultant
- Interstella 5555: The 5tory of the 5ecret 5tar 5ystem (2003) – co-writer, co-producer, remaster supervisor
- Human After All (2005) – production coordination
  - Human After All: Remixes (2006) – production coordination
- Daft Punk's Electroma (2006) – co-writer, editor
- Alive 2007 (2007) – creative director
- Logorama (2009) – creative director
- Tron: Legacy (2010) – creative director
- Random Access Memories (2013) – creative director, cover art
  - "Lose Yourself to Dance" – music video co-director, video editor
- Random Access Memories: 10th Anniversary Edition (2023) – Supervisor, creative director, cover art
  - "The Writing of Fragments of Time" – music video director
- Mythologies (2023) – art design, layout
- Chiroptera (2024) – art design, layout
- Mirage (2026) - art design, layout
