= Not news =

Not news may refer to:

- Not the Nine O'Clock News, British comedy sketch show (1979–1982)
- Not Necessarily the News, American comedy sketch show (1982–1990)
- "Not the News", a song from the 2019 album Anima by Thom Yorke
