= An Urban Allegory (film) =

2024 short film by Alice Rohrwacher and JR

- Film poster
- French: Allégorie citadine
- Directed by: Alice Rohrwacher; JR
- Written by: Alice Rohrwacher; JR
- Based on: Allegory of the cave by Plato
- Produced by: Alexandra Henochsberg; Pierre-François Piet; Marc Azoulay
- Starring: Lyna Khoudri; Naïm El Kaldaoui; Leos Carax
- Cinematography: Daria D'Antonio
- Edited by: Nelly Quettier
- Music by: Thomas Bangalter
- Production companies: Ad Vitam; Social Animals; Arte France Cinéma; Arte France
- Distributed by: Ad Vitam
- Release date: 1 September 2024 (Venice)
- Running time: 21 minutes
- Country: France
- Language: French

An Urban Allegory (French: Allégorie citadine) is 2024 French short film co-written and co-directed by Alice Rohrwacher and JR based on Plato's Allegory of the cave, starring Lyna Khoudri, Naïm El Kaldaoui and Leos Carax. The film had its world premiere at the 81st Venice Film Festival in the Out of Competition (Fiction) section on 1 September 2024.

== Cast ==
- Naïm El Kaldaoui as Jay
- Lyna Khoudri as Jay's mother
- Leos Carax as the director

== Production ==
Co-directed and co-written by Italian filmmaker Alice Rohrwacher and French artist JR on their second collaboration after Omelia Contadina (2020), An Urban Allegory is based on Plato's Allegory of the cave and marks Naïm El Kaldaoui's first role as 7-year-old protagonist Jay.

The film was produced by Ad Vitam and Social Animals, co-produced by Arte France Cinéma with the participation of Arte France and the support of French fashion house Chanel, and features visual effects by the Paris-based branch of the British studio Moving Picture Company (MPC). The short film is connected to the collaborative art project Chiroptera, with the score being composed by Thomas Bangalter and choreographed by Damien Jalet.

The directors said about the film in a press statement released in August 2024:

What lies behind the daily movement of a city? Last winter, we met in Paris and began discussing the Allegory of the cave, as told in Plato's Republic. The myth imagines humanity living in chains, facing the back of a cave, and watching shadows move on the walls, thinking it is reality. We both work with images, which certainly can be illusions, but can also become instruments of struggle and liberation of thought. So, from this discussion, we decided to create a short film. We had a few fixed ideas—the cave, the dance, the city bustling around us—and one question: what would happen if we all managed to turn together towards the exit of the cave? Perhaps it is not enough to assert that images are illusions as long as the chains that bind us are real.

== Release ==
An Urban Allegory had its world premiere at the 2024 Venice Film Festival in the Out of Competition (Fiction) section on 1 September 2024. On the same day of its premiere at Venice and through 30 September 2024, the film was available to be watched online around the world and free of charge on the website Festival Scope.

The film will be released in France by Ad Vitam.

In August 2024, The Match Factory acquired international sales rights for the film.

The film was selected for the MAMI Mumbai Film Festival 2024 under the World Cinema section, where it was screened together with Universal Language by Matthew Rankin.
