= List of The Daily Show with Jon Stewart guests =

This is a list of noteworthy guests that have been on The Daily Show with Jon Stewart. As of his appearance on August 15, 2012, Brian Williams has made 15 appearances as an interview guest. Prior to Williams, the most frequently appearing guest on the program was Sen. John McCain with 13 visits. McCain was introduced by Jon Stewart as the "most frequently appearing guest" during McCain's appearance on 16 August 2007. As of 2015, the most frequent guest on the show is Fareed Zakaria, with 19 appearances and Comedian/Actor Denis Leary, with 16 appearances since Jon took over in 1999.

== Politicians ==
=== Heads of state, heads of government, deputy heads of state or their spouses ===
- Barack Obama, former president of the United States
- Joe Biden, former vice president of the United States
- Jimmy Carter, former President of the United States
- Bill Clinton, former president of the United States
- Al Gore, former vice president of the United States
- Hillary Clinton, former United States Secretary of State and wife of former U.S. president Bill Clinton
- Tony Blair, former prime minister of the United Kingdom
- Gordon Brown, former prime minister of the United Kingdom
- Vicente Fox, former president of Mexico
- Evo Morales, President of Bolivia
- Pervez Musharraf, former president of Pakistan
- Abdullah II, King of Jordan
- Ellen Johnson Sirleaf, President of Liberia
- Rosalynn Carter wife of former president of the United States Jimmy Carter
- Lynne Cheney, wife of former U.S. vice president Dick Cheney
- Michelle Obama, wife of President of the United States Barack Obama
- Mohamed Nasheed, former president of the Maldives
- Nicola Sturgeon, current first minister of Scotland
- Jacinda Ardern, former prime minister of New Zealand

=== Members of the United States Cabinet ===
- Madeleine Albright, former United States Secretary of State
- Robert Gates, former United States Secretary of Defense
- John Ashcroft, former United States Attorney General
- James Baker, former United States Secretary of State
- Zbigniew Brzezinski, former United States National Security Advisor
- Steven Chu, United States Secretary of Energy
- Austan Goolsbee, former chairman of the Council of Economic Advisers
- Lisa P. Jackson, Administrator of the Environmental Protection Agency
- Henry Kissinger, former United States Secretary of State
- Ray LaHood, United States Secretary of Transportation
- Gary Locke, United States Secretary of Commerce
- Ray Mabus, United States Secretary of the Navy
- Janet Napolitano, United States Secretary of Homeland Security
- Paul O'Neill, former United States Secretary of the Treasury
- Colin Powell, former United States Secretary of State
- Robert Reich, former United States Secretary of Labor
- Tom Ridge, former United States Secretary of Homeland Security
- Donald Rumsfeld, former United States Secretary of Defense
- Ken Salazar, United States Secretary of the Interior—First Obama cabinet member to be guest during time in office.
- Kathleen Sebelius, United States Secretary of Health and Human Services
- Margaret Spellings, United States Secretary of Education—The only Bush cabinet level guest to appear while holding office.
- Christine Todd Whitman, former governor of New Jersey and Administrator of the Environmental Protection Agency

=== United States senators ===
- Evan Bayh, (D) Indiana, former
- Joe Biden, (D) Delaware, former
- Barbara Boxer, (D) California
- Bill Bradley, (D) New Jersey, former
- Lincoln Chafee, (I) Rhode Island, former
- Hillary Clinton, (D) New York, former
- Norm Coleman, (R) Minnesota, former
- Tom Daschle, (D) South Dakota, former
- Chris Dodd, (D) Connecticut, former
- Bob Dole, (R) Kansas, former
- Dick Durbin, (D), Illinois
- John Edwards, (D) North Carolina, former
- Russell Feingold, (D) Wisconsin, former
- Al Franken, (D) Minnesota
- Gary Hart, (D) Colorado, former
- Kay Bailey Hutchison, (R) Texas, former
- Ted Kennedy, (D) Massachusetts, former
- Bob Kerrey, (D) Nebraska, former
- John Kerry, (D) Massachusetts, former
- Joseph Lieberman, (I) Connecticut, former
- Trent Lott, (R) Mississippi, former
- John McCain, (R) Arizona
- Bob Menendez, (D) New Jersey
- Zell Miller, (D) Georgia, former
- Carol Moseley-Braun, (D) Illinois, former
- Ben Nelson, (D) Nebraska, former
- Barack Obama, (D) Illinois, former
- Rand Paul, (R) Kentucky
- Bernie Sanders, (I) Vermont
- Rick Santorum, (R) Pennsylvania, former
- Charles Schumer, (D) New York
- Arlen Specter, (D), Pennsylvania, former

=== United States representatives ===
- Henry Bonilla, (R)
- Barney Frank, (D), chairman of the United States House Committee on Financial Services
- Dick Gephardt, (D)
- Newt Gingrich, (R) former Speaker
- Dennis Kucinich, (D)
- Ron Paul, (R)
- Nancy Pelosi, (D) Speaker

=== Other federal officers and advisers ===
- John R. Bolton, former United States Ambassador to the United Nations
- Michael D. Brown, former administrator of Federal Emergency Management Agency
- Andrew Card, former White House Chief of Staff
- Ari Fleischer, former White House Press Secretary
- Alan Greenspan, former chairman of the Federal Reserve
- Karen Hughes, former executive adviser to President George H. W. Bush
- Scott McClellan, former White House Press Secretary
- Dana Perino, former White House Press Secretary
- Richard Perle, former Assistant United States Secretary of Defense
- Tony Snow, former White House Press Secretary
- George Tenet, former Director of Central Intelligence for the United States Central Intelligence Agency
- Ambassador Joseph C. Wilson
- Supreme Court Justice Sonia Sotomayor

=== Governors ===
- Evan Bayh, former governor of Indiana
- Rod Blagojevich, former governor of Illinois
- Jon Corzine, former governor of New Jersey
- Mario Cuomo, former governor of New York
- Mitch Daniels, Governor of Indiana
- Howard Dean, former governor of Vermont and chairman of the Democratic National Committee
- Mike Huckabee, former governor of Arkansas
- Tim Kaine, former governor of Virginia, and chairman of the Democratic National Committee
- Bob Kerrey, former governor of Nebraska
- James McGreevey, former governor of New Jersey
- Tim Pawlenty, former governor of Minnesota
- Rick Perry, former governor of Texas
- Marc Racicot, former governor of Montana and former chairman of the Republican National Committee
- Bill Richardson, former governor of New Mexico
- Tim Walz, current governor of Minnesota
- William Weld, former governor of Massachusetts

=== Mayors ===
- Bill de Blasio, Mayor of New York City
- Michael Bloomberg, former Mayor of New York City
- Rudy Giuliani, former Mayor of New York City
- Ed Koch, former Mayor of New York City
- Boris Johnson, Mayor of London
- Ray Nagin, former Mayor of New Orleans

=== Other political guests ===
- Ali Allawi, former Minister of Defense of Iraq
- Donna Brazile, former campaign manager for Al Gore
- Pat Buchanan, political commentator, unsuccessful candidate for the Republican nomination for president, 1992 and 1996; unsuccessful Reform Party nominee for president in 2000
- Wesley Clark, retired U.S. Army general, unsuccessful candidate for the Democratic nomination for president in 2004
- Elizabeth Edwards, deceased wife of former North Carolina Senator John Edwards
- Ed Gillespie, former chairman of the Republican National Committee
- Bill Kristol, political commentator, founder/editor of The Weekly Standard
- Christine Lagarde, Managing Director of the International Monetary Fund
- Terry McAuliffe, former chairman of the Democratic National Committee
- Ken Mehlman, campaign manager for George W. Bush in 2004 and former chairman of the Republican National Committee
- Ralph Nader, consumer advocate, four-time unsuccessful Green and independent candidate for President
- Jenny Sanford, ex-wife of former South Carolina Governor Mark Sanford
- Rev. Al Sharpton, civil rights activist, unsuccessful candidate for the Democratic nomination for President in 2004
- Howard Stern, producer and radio talk show host
- Archbishop Desmond Tutu, South African anti-apartheid leader, human rights spokesman
- Bob Woodward and Carl Bernstein, Washington Post journalists who broke Watergate scandal; authors
- Howard Zinn, historian, political activists
- John Zogby, pollster, founder and president/CEO of Zogby International

== Journalists ==
- Christiane Amanpour, ABC host of This Week
- Reza Aslan, Middle East Analyst for CBS News
- Maziar Bahari, Newsweek
- Fred Barnes, Fox News analyst
- Tom Brokaw, former NBC Nightly News anchor
- Rajiv Chandrasekaran, assistant managing editor of The Washington Post, author
- Anderson Cooper, CNN Correspondent and host of Anderson Cooper 360
- Bob Costas, NBC Sports commentator
- Katie Couric, CBS Evening News anchor
- Thomas Friedman, nationally syndicated columnist
- David Gregory, NBC
- Christopher Hitchens, columnist and author
- Peter Jennings, late ABC World News Tonight anchor
- Jim Kelly, managing editor of Time magazine
- Ted Koppel, former host of Nightline
- Larry King, former host of Larry King Live
- Matt Lauer, Co-anchor of NBC's The Today Show
- Lara Logan, CBS News war correspondent.
- Rachel Maddow, host of MSNBC's The Rachel Maddow Show
- Chris Matthews, host of MSNBC's Hardball with Chris Matthews
- Michael Moore, documentary filmmaker
- Bill Moyers, former host of PBS's Now
- Bill O'Reilly, host of The O'Reilly Factor on Fox News
- Jeremy Paxman, host of the BBC's Newsnight
- Dan Rather, former CBS Evening News anchor
- Al Roker, weatherman of NBC's Today Show
- Helen Thomas, White House Correspondent
- Mike Wallace, former host of 60 Minutes
- Barbara Walters, conductor of The View
- Brian Williams, former NBC Nightly News anchor
- Fareed Zakaria, former editor of Newsweek International
- Jorge Ramos, Noticiero Univision anchor

== Actors and actresses ==
- Ben Affleck, actor and Academy Award-winning screenwriter
- Alan Alda
- Amy Adams
- Gillian Anderson
- Julie Andrews
- Rowan Atkinson
- Kate Beckinsale
- Halle Berry, Academy Award-winning actress
- David Boreanaz
- Adrien Brody, Academy Award-winning actor
- Pierce Brosnan
- Sandra Bullock, Academy Award-winning actress
- Steve Carell
- George Clooney, Academy Award-winning actor
- Sacha Baron Cohen, once as Borat and once out of character
- Daniel Craig, current James Bond
- David Cross
- Russell Crowe, Academy Award-winning actor
- Matt Damon, Academy Award-winning actor
- Claire Danes
- Cameron Diaz
- David Duchovny
- Clint Eastwood
- Carmen Electra
- Colin Farrell
- Colin Firth, Academy Award-winning actor
- Mick Foley, pro wrestler and writer
- Harrison Ford, Academy Award nominee
- Jodie Foster, two-time Academy Award-winning actress
- Jamie Foxx, Academy Award-winning actor
- Richard Gere
- Ricky Gervais
- Adam Goldberg
- Joseph Gordon-Levitt
- Topher Grace
- Seth Green
- Jake Gyllenhaal, Academy Award nominee
- Maggie Gyllenhaal, Academy Award nominee
- Anne Hathaway, Academy Award nominee
- Dustin Hoffman, two-time Academy Award-winning actor
- Ron Howard, actor and Academy Award-winning director
- Samuel L. Jackson, Academy Award nominee
- Angelina Jolie, Academy Award-winning actress
- Keira Knightley, Academy Award nominee
- Denis Leary, comedian
- Heath Ledger, Academy Award-winning actor
- Ashton Kutcher
- John Malkovich, Academy Award nominee
- Rachel McAdams
- Ian McKellen, Academy Award nominee
- Dennis Miller, comedian
- Clive Owen, Academy Award nominee
- Elliot Page, Academy Award nominee
- Robert Patrick
- Dev Patel
- Matthew Perry
- Natalie Portman, Academy Award-winning actress
- Dennis Quaid
- John C. Reilly, Academy Award nominee
- Christina Ricci
- Seth Rogen
- Paul Rudd
- Adam Sandler
- Jerry Seinfeld
- Ben Stiller
- Meryl Streep, three-time Academy Award-winning actress
- Christopher Walken, Academy Award-winning actor
- Bruce Willis
- Elijah Wood
- Jim Parsons

== Musicians ==
- Tori Amos
- Arcade Fire
- Atoms for Peace, who performed "Default" and "Harrowdown Hill"
- Justin Bieber, who performed on the show
- Jon Bon Jovi
- Bono
- Coldplay, who performed songs from their 2008 album, Viva La Vida
- Jakob Dylan
- The Goo Goo Dolls
- Dave Grohl
- Jack's Mannequin, who performed songs from their 2008 album, The Glass Passenger
- Wynton Marsalis
- John Mellencamp
- Willie Nelson
- Pink, who performed on the show
- Questlove
- RZA
- Richie Sambora
- Slash
- Esperanza Spalding, who performed on the show
- Bruce Springsteen, who performed on the show
- Ringo Starr, who performed on the show with Ben Harper and Relentless7
- Tenacious D, who performed on the show
- They Might Be Giants, who also perform The Daily Show theme song, penned by Bob Mould
- Pete Townshend
- Tom Waits, who performed on the show
- The White Stripes, who performed on the show
- Neil Young
- Charlie Crockett

== Athletes and sports figures ==
- Lance Armstrong
- Tiki Barber
- Charles Barkley
- Bob Bradley
- Tom Coughlin
- Landon Donovan
- Cuba Gooding, Jr.
- Phil Jackson
- LeBron James
- Derek Jeter
- Magic Johnson
- Willie Mays
- Reggie Miller
- Shaquille O'Neal
- Pelé
- Mike Piazza
- Jerry Rice
- Mariano Rivera
- Bill Russell
- Phil Simms
- Tim Tebow
- Mookie Wilson
- David Wright
- Matt Harvey

== Businessmen ==
- Elon Musk, co-founder of Tesla Inc., SpaceX, Solar City, Neuralink, OpenAI, PayPal
- Jeff Bezos, founder of Amazon.com
- Richard Branson, Chairman of Virgin Group
- Bill Gates, Chairman of Microsoft
- Craig Newmark, founder of Craigslist
- Jimmy Wales, co-founder of Wikipedia

== Writers ==
- Ian Bremmer
- Denis Leary
- David Sedaris
- Kurt Vonnegut
- Michael Wallis
- Howard Zinn
- John Green

== See also ==
- List of The Daily Show episodes
