= Chiroptera (disambiguation) =

Chiroptera is the order of flying mammals commonly called "bats".

Chiroptera may also refer to:

- Chiroptera (performance art), 2023 installation in Paris
- Chiroptera, fictional creatures in the anime film Blood: The Last Vampire and the anime television series Blood+
