= Thomas Bangalter =

French musician (born 1975)

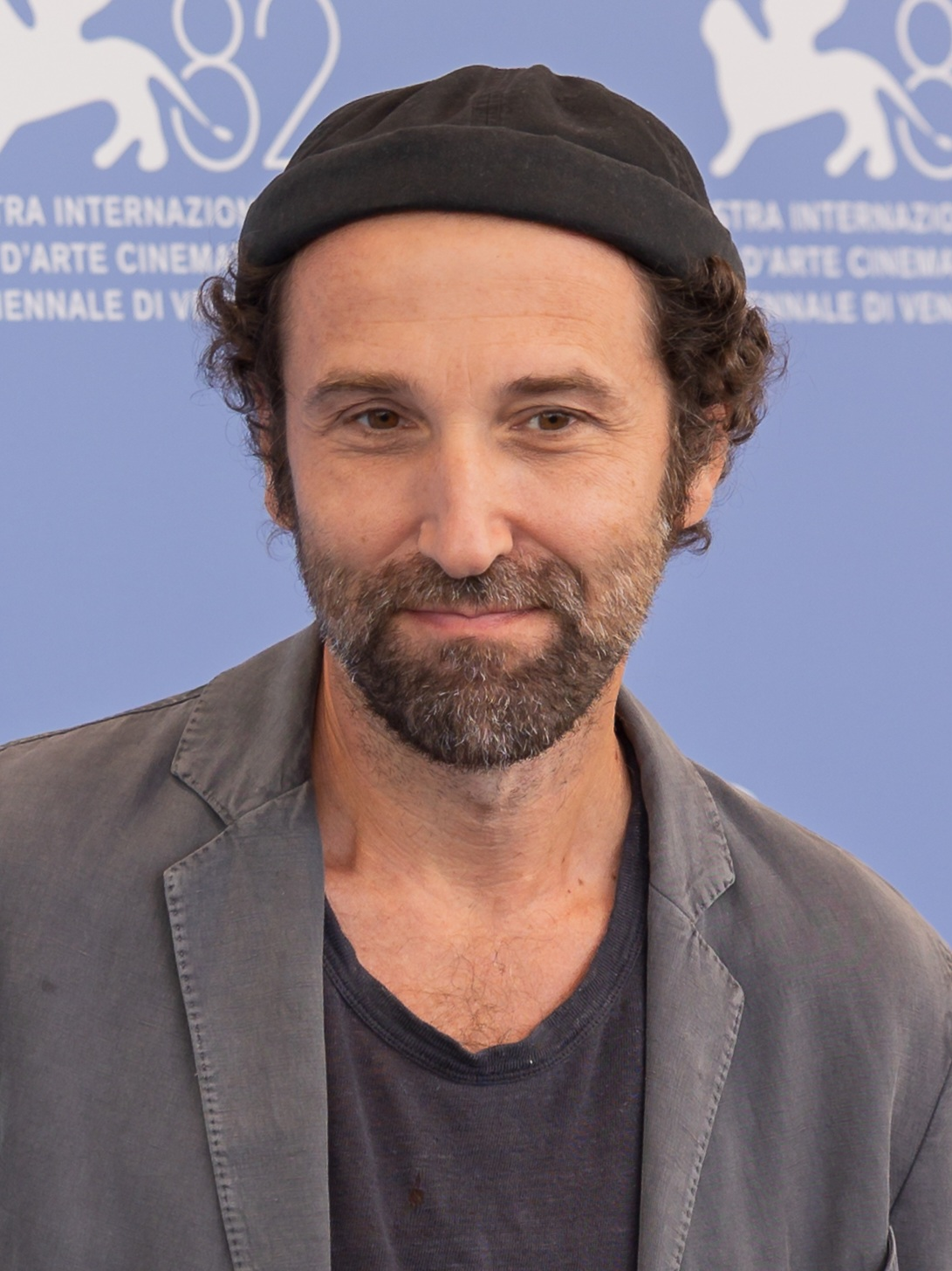
- Bangalter at the 82nd Venice Film Festival in 2025

Background information
- Born: 3 January 1975 (age 51); Paris, France
- Genres: House; electronic; dance; disco
- Occupations: Musician; record producer; disc jockey; composer; director
- Instruments: Keyboards; synthesizer; bass guitar; guitar; vocoder; programming; vocals
- Years active: 1992–present
- Labels: Erato; Ed Banger; Alberts & Gothmaan; Roulé
- Formerly of: Darlin'; Daft Punk; Stardust; Together
- Spouse: Élodie Bouchez (m. 1996)
- Children: 2
- Father: Daniel Bangalter

Thomas Bangalter (French pronunciation: [tɔmɑ bɑ̃ɡaltɛʁ]; born 3 January 1975) is a French musician, record producer, DJ, and composer. He is best known as one-half of former French electronic music duo Daft Punk, alongside Guy-Manuel de Homem-Christo. He has also recorded and released music as a member of the trio Stardust, the duo Together, and as a solo artist. Bangalter's work has influenced a wide range of artists in various genres.

Bangalter owned the music label Roulé until its liquidation in 2018. Since Daft Punk's disbandment in 2021, he has made increasingly more public appearances, and has released music under his solo label, Alberts & Gothmaan, an anagram of his name. He has provided compositions for several films, leading the soundtrack to Irréversible, as well as several ballets, including Mythologies and Mirage. Outside of music production, his credits include film director and cinematographer. Bangalter is the son of former French music composer and artist Daniel Bangalter, known professionally as Daniel Vangarde.

== Early life ==
Thomas Bangalter was born on 3 January 1975 in Paris. He began playing the piano at the age of 6, taking lessons from a music staff member of the Paris Opera. Bangalter has stated that his parents were strict in keeping up his practice, for which he later thanked them. His mother, Thérèse Thoreux, was a classical dancer and choreographer, as well as his aunt and uncle. His father, Daniel Bangalter, known throughout his professional career as Daniel Vangarde, was a songwriter and producer for performers such as the Gibson Brothers, Ottawan and Sheila B. Devotion. As expressed by Bangalter, "I never had any intention to do what my father was doing". Bangalter's father is French Jewish, but the family did not consider themselves religious.

== Career ==
=== 1987–2000: Early years and Daft Punk formation ===
Bangalter met Guy-Manuel de Homem-Christo while attending the Lycée Carnot secondary school in Paris in 1987. They discovered their mutual fascination with films and music of the 1960s and 1970s, "very basic cult teenager things, from Easy Rider to the Velvet Underground." They and Laurent Brancowitz eventually joined to form an indie rock trio called Darlin', in which Bangalter performed bass guitar. Bangalter felt that "It was still maybe more a teenage thing at that time. It's like, you know, everybody wants to be in a band." A negative review from Melody Maker magazine referred to their music as "a daft punky thrash", which inspired Bangalter and Homem-Christo's new band name.

Shortly before reaching the age of 18, the newly formed Daft Punk became interested in electronic music, which led Brancowitz to leave the group in pursuit of efforts with fellow Parisian band Phoenix. In 1993, Bangalter presented a demo of Daft Punk material to Stuart Macmillan of Slam that led to their first single "The New Wave". Daniel Vangarde provided valuable advice for the duo. "He helped us by presenting to us what the situation was with the record industry and how it worked. Knowing that, we made certain choices in order to achieve what we wanted."

Vangarde was thanked for his efforts in the liner notes of Homework. The title of the album is partially attributed to the fact that Homework was recorded in Bangalter's bedroom. As he remarked, "I had to move the bed into another room to make space for the gear." In the years following the 1997 release, Bangalter focused on his own record label, Roulé ("rolled" in French). The label released singles by Romanthony, Roy Davis Jr., and Bangalter's own solo material among others. In 1996, Bangalter was in a DJ collective known as Da Mongoloids, consisting of Armand Van Helden, Bangalter, and Junior Sanchez, under the record label Strictly Rhythm. They played DJ sets, and Van Helden released a solo song named "Spark Da Meth" under Da Mongoloids' name, crediting Bangalter as a special thanks. Bangalter's solo works were released on two vinyl-only EPs titled Trax on da Rocks in 1995 and 1998 respectively. The songs "Outrun", "Extra Dry", and "Turbo" from the EPs later appeared in the video game Midnight Club II. The track "On da Rocks" was featured in a "Da Funk" behind-the-scenes video included with D.A.F.T.: A Story About Dogs, Androids, Firemen and Tomatoes. Bangalter collaborated with Alan Braxe and Benjamin Diamond and in 1998 released the club hit "Music Sounds Better with You" under the name Stardust. Just as for Homework, the single was recorded in Bangalter's home studio.

Around the same time of "Music Sounds Better with You", Bangalter co-produced Bob Sinclar's second single titled "Gym Tonic". The single caused a minor dispute as it contained samples from a Jane Fonda workout tape, which led Fonda herself to refuse permission for the single to be released officially. A British act called Spacedust released a re-recorded version of the track, titled "Gym and Tonic" under East West Records to wider commercial success. "Gym and Tonic" topped the UK Singles Chart in Spacedust's native United Kingdom in October 1998 after "Music Sounds Better with You" had peaked at number two on the same chart two months earlier.

During 1998, Bangalter and de Homem-Christo collaborated with Romanthony in what would become the first of the Discovery sessions. One of the tracks produced, "One More Time" became a hit Daft Punk single in 2000. Bangalter also performed on a Yamaha CS-60 synthesizer on the track "Embuscade" in Phoenix's debut album United, which was released the same year. He also teamed up with DJ Falcon under the name Together to release their eponymous 2000 single.

=== 2000–2020: Further Daft Punk and solo productions ===
Bangalter produced the score to the film Irréversible, released in 2002. A soundtrack album of the same name was later released featuring Bangalter's tracks as well as the works by Gustav Mahler, Étienne Daho, and Beethoven used in the film. North American pressings of the album feature only the Bangalter tracks. Three of the tracks from the Trax on da Rocks EPs were released on the album: "Outrun", "Ventura", and "Extra Dry". 2002 also saw the release of the Bangalter-produced track "113 Fout La Merde" for French hip hop group 113. Bangalter can be seen dancing in the music video, wearing his Daft Punk helmet.

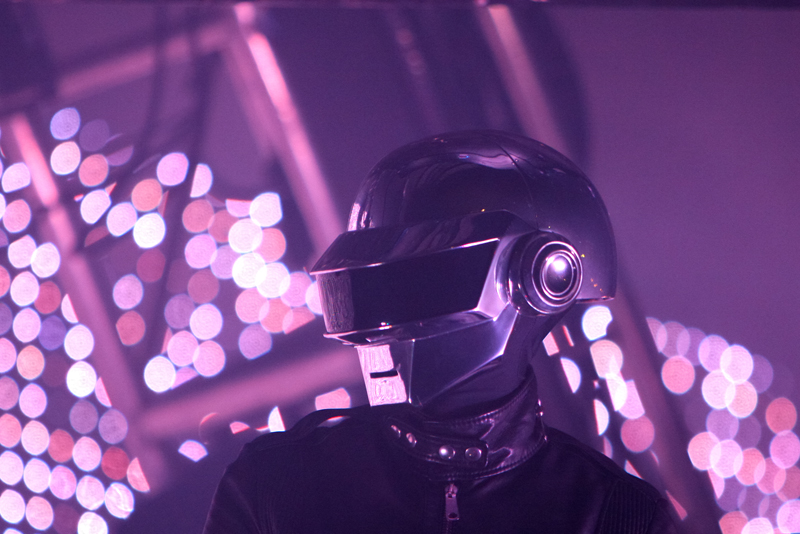
Bangalter performing as a member of Daft Punk in 2006

Together released the single "So Much Love to Give" in 2003. The Eric Prydz track "Call on Me" based on Steve Winwood's song "Valerie" was mistakenly thought to be a Together release. According to DJ Falcon, Together had previously sampled "Valerie" similarly in their solo mixes prior to Prydz's track, but they had no intention to release it as a single. In 2005, Daft Punk released their third studio album, Human After All, to mixed reviews. As Homem-Christo noted, "Every album we've done is tightly linked with our lives. [...] The internal, personal stuff Thomas went through during Human After All made it closer to where he was at the time".

Bangalter was the sound effects director for the 2009 film Enter the Void, his second work with filmmaker Gaspar Noé following Irréversible. He initially had been approached by Noé to compose the soundtrack of Enter the Void, but Bangalter was preoccupied with work on the Tron: Legacy score at the time. Bangalter instead provided various clips of drones and ambiance for the film to be accompanied by music by other artists from the 1960s and 70s. He is billed in the credits as sound effects director, and the film features his track "Désaccords" originally composed for Irréversible.

In 2010, Bangalter and Homem-Christo were admitted into the Ordre des Arts et des Lettres, an order of merit of France. The two were individually awarded the rank of Chevalier (knight). In 2011, Bangalter directed and choreographed a short film featuring Élodie Bouchez that served as an advertisement for the fashion line Co. A year later, Bangalter scored the short film First Point directed by Richard Phillips and starring Lindsay Lohan.

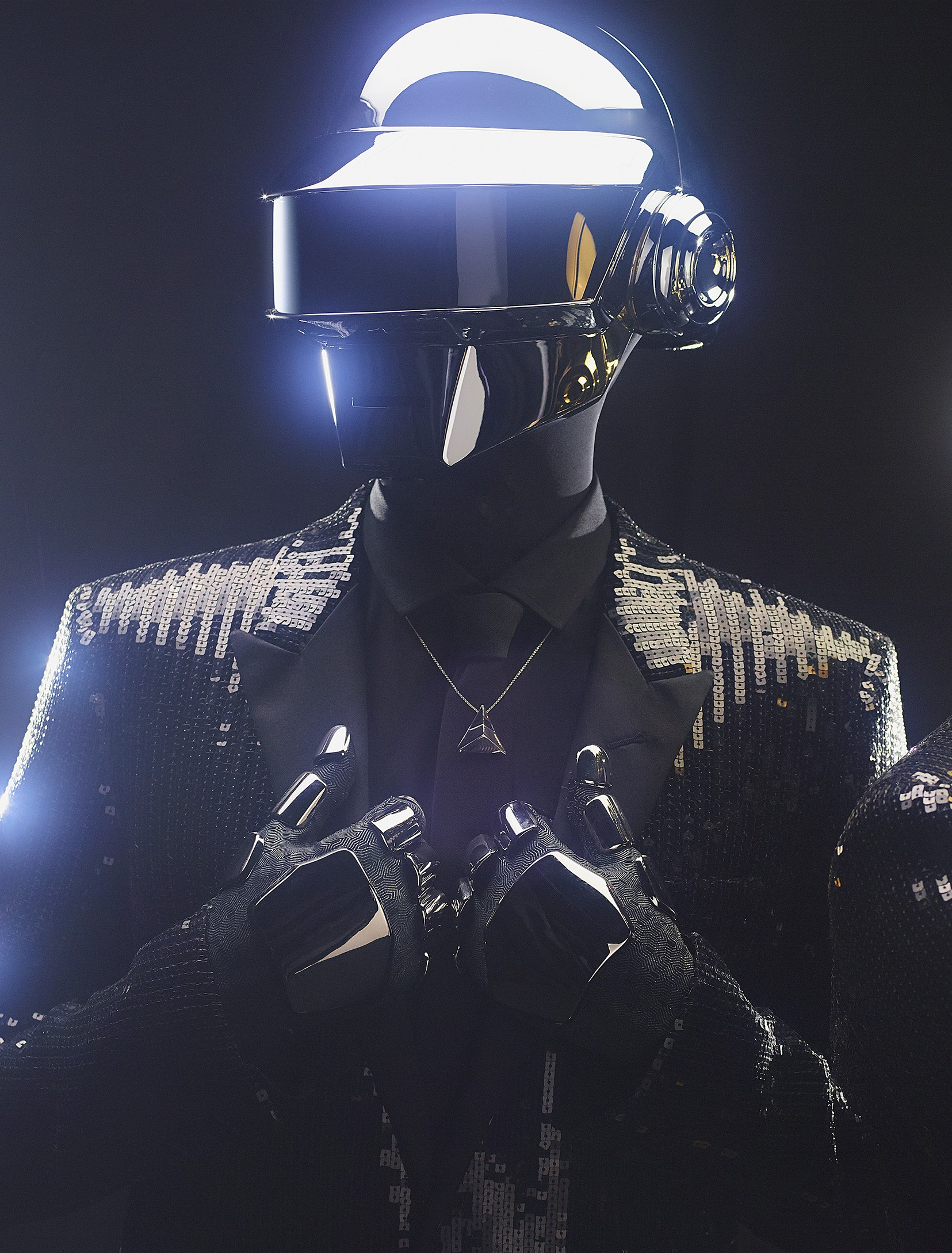
Bangalter as a member of Daft Punk in 2013

In 2013, Bangalter and Homem-Christo released their fourth studio album, Random Access Memories. One of the collaborators on the album, Giorgio Moroder, recalled that the duo had a perfectionist approach; he had recorded his vocal contribution on multiple microphones despite the fact that only Bangalter would notice the difference. In 2016, Daft Punk produced and co-wrote two songs from The Weeknd's third studio album, "Starboy" and "I Feel It Coming," the former of which became the duo's first number one hit on the Billboard Hot 100. In June 2017, Daft Punk also produced and co-wrote a single for the Australian electropop band Parcels. This would eventually become Daft Punk's final musical production as a duo.

Bangalter was one of the producers on Arcade Fire's album Everything Now, which was released in July 2017. In 2018, he worked with Noé again, providing two tracks for the film Climax, including the previously unreleased “Sangria.” He also co-produced and co-wrote two tracks from Matthieu Chedid's 2019 album Lettre infinie, while also mastering the album.

Later in 2018, Alan Braxe and Benjamin Diamond revealed that they and Bangalter returned to the studio to work on a remastered version of "Music Sounds Better with You" for the song's twentieth anniversary. Bangalter's label Roulé was liquidated the same year. The remaster released on 28 June 2019.

=== 2021–present: Daft Punk disbandment and solo projects ===
On 22 February 2021, Daft Punk released an 8-minute-long video to their YouTube channel titled "Epilogue". The video, which features a scene from their 2006 film Electroma in which one robot self-destructs and the other walks into the sunset, alluded to their disbandment after a 28-year career. Upon request for an official statement regarding the disbandment, Bangalter released a handwritten note quoting the Daft Punk song "Touch" alongside a clip of the 1936 film Modern Times, in which one character tells another to smile before they both walk away into the distance. Friend and collaborator Todd Edwards clarified that Bangalter and Homem-Christo remain active separately, and that Bangalter in particular was looking into potential solo projects. The two still share a studio and equipment.

The 2022 film En Corps, directed by Cédric Klapisch, features a score by Hofesh Shechter with a brief contribution from Bangalter.

In July 2021, it was announced that Bangalter's first major solo project following Daft Punk's split would be providing the score to a French ballet titled Mythologies, presented by Ballet Preljocaj. The 90-minute ballet, premiering in July 2022, features direction and choreography by Angelin Preljocaj and original music by Bangalter, with musical direction by Romain Dumas. The ballet premiered at the Grand Théâtre de Bordeaux, with the show having plans to tour. An album version of the score was later announced for release on vinyl and CD in April 2023 by Erato Records, in conjunction with a new solo label from Bangalter called Alberts & Gothmaan.

During the promotion of Mythologies, Bangalter spoke to several news outlets about the solo project, Daft Punk's anniversary releases, and the duo's split. He noted that he would eschew his robotic persona, citing concerns in artificial intelligence (AI) and technological developments: "As much as I love this character, the last thing I would want to be, in the world we live in, in 2023, is a robot." When asked if he was renouncing electronic music entirely, Bangalter clarified that, while Daft Punk was a "thing of the past," he had no intention of permanently abandoning drum machines and synthesizers for future projects. The press release of Mythologies included a drawing of his unmasked face by Vulture Magazine illustrator Stéphane Manel, and contemporaneous interviews feature Bangalter without a costume.

In October 2023, Bangalter was one of the participants in a 25-hour event called "La Grande Veillée" celebrating the reopening of the Théâtre de la Ville in Paris. He performed an original composition alongside 32 dancers on stage choreographed by Saïdo Lehlouh. In July 2024, a ballet, entitled Apaches, premiered with choreography by Lehlouh and music scored by Bangalter.

Bangalter composed the original score for Quentin Dupieux's film Daaaaaalí! which premiered at the 2023 Venice Film Festival and had a wide release in 2024. Bangalter's music was released on streaming services and on a limited 10" vinyl via Ed Banger Records in February 2024.

In November 2023, Bangalter worked with the artist JR and choreographer Damien Jalet on an art project called Chiroptera presented in front of the Place de l'Opera. Bangalter composed music for the project, with Jalet choreographing over 150 dancers in a cavernous art structure. It was performed to the public for free twice on the evening of 12 November. The soundtrack was released in June 2024 on digital platforms and released on vinyl in August via Because Music. Alongside the finished music of the performance, a nearly six-hour track of raw music by Bangalter from the Chiroptera sessions was released as well. JR and filmmaker Alice Rohrwacher co-directed a 2024 short film connected to the themes of Chiroptera titled An Urban Allegory, which is scored by Bangalter's music for the project and choreographed by Jalet.

Bangalter provided music to a ballet choreographed by Jalet in 2024 called Mirage. The work was released as a solo album from Bangalter in June 2026. After meeting Kunihiko Morinaga collaborating on Mirage, Bangalter composed original music for Anrealage's fall 2025 and spring 2026 shows for Paris Fashion Week.

In 2022, Bangalter was seen in the studio with rapper Lil Nas X. In November 2024, Lil Nas X released the single "Light Again!" written and produced with Bangalter.

In 2023, it was reported that Bangalter would appear on two tracks of the solo album Times from former Kraftwerk member Wolfgang Flür. The tracks, released in March 2025, supposedly featured Bangalter under the name "Thomas Vangarde" alongside Peter Hook. However, it was revealed after the album's release that the person Flür had collaborated with was an online imposter impersonating Bangalter.

In April 2025, Sons of Raphael released the main theme to the Amazon Prime Video series Étoile. Both the theme tune and a B-side were produced by Bangalter and released under his Alberts & Gothmaan label.

Bangalter was cast in the film Chien 51 directed by Cédric Jimenez. It is his first acting role in a film other than a cameo in Quentin Dupieux's 2014 film Reality. The film had its world premiere out of competition at the 82nd Venice International Film Festival, where Bangalter was in attendance along with the cast and crew.

In October 2025, Bangalter was announced as a surprise performer alongside Fred Again, Erol Alkan, and Pedro Winter at Because Music's live show at the Centre Pompidou before its closing for renovations. It was Bangalter's first public DJ set since 2009. In February 2026, Bangalter was announced as a special guest performer at Fred Again's closing show of his two-day residency at Alexandra Palace in London during his USB002 Tour.

Bangalter featured on Orelsan's album La fuite en avant, released on 7 November 2025. Bangalter worked on the track "Yoroï", the title track for the French film of the same name starring and co-written by Orelsan.

On 28 May 2026, Bangalter released a remix of the Mythologies track "XIX. Circonvolutions" on streaming services and limited 12" vinyl, and was used in a short film for Chanel directed by Alfonso Cuarón, starring Jacob Elordi.

Following their collaboration on Chiroptera, Bangalter reunited with JR on another art installation, La Caverne du Pont Neuf. The installation consisted of converting the Pont Neuf into a cavernous structure, in homage to the 40th anniversary of Christo and Jeanne-Claude's work, The Pont Neuf Wrapped. Bangalter composed the ambient sounds for the event, and the installation was free and open to the public. Originally slated for public access from 6 June through 28 June 2026, the opening for the installation was postponed to 15 June due to wind damage.

That same month, on 8 June 2026, Bangalter and Cédric Hervet, Daft Punk's creative director, participated in a live Q&A session following a 4K rescreening of the 2006 film Daft Punk's Electroma that premiered at Tribeca Festival for the film's 20th anniversary. Hours before the premiere, Bangalter performed a surprise DJ set at The Lot Radio in Brooklyn, New York, which marked his first DJ set in the United States since 2009.

On 20 June 2026, Bangalter worked with French-Swiss conceptual artist Julian Charrière and German DJ and producer Rampa to present another art installation, Warehouse Artefacts, which took place during Art Basel at Messe Basel. The collaboration integrated the experience into the broader cultural agenda of the fair, linking modern art with electronic music in a common environment. During the daytime, the installation was staged as a deconstructed dance floor that "brings together transmissions from both political history and underground culture." The installation unfolded into a rave at night, with a DJ set led by Rampa and a "special guest", whom of which was Bangalter.

On 30 October 2026, Bangalter performed a surprise DJ set in Paris as a special guest at Ed Banger Records' 20th-anniversary celebration of DJ Mehdi's 2006 album Lucky Boy, alongside performers such as A-Trak, Busy P, DJ Falcon, and Breakbot.

== Personal life ==
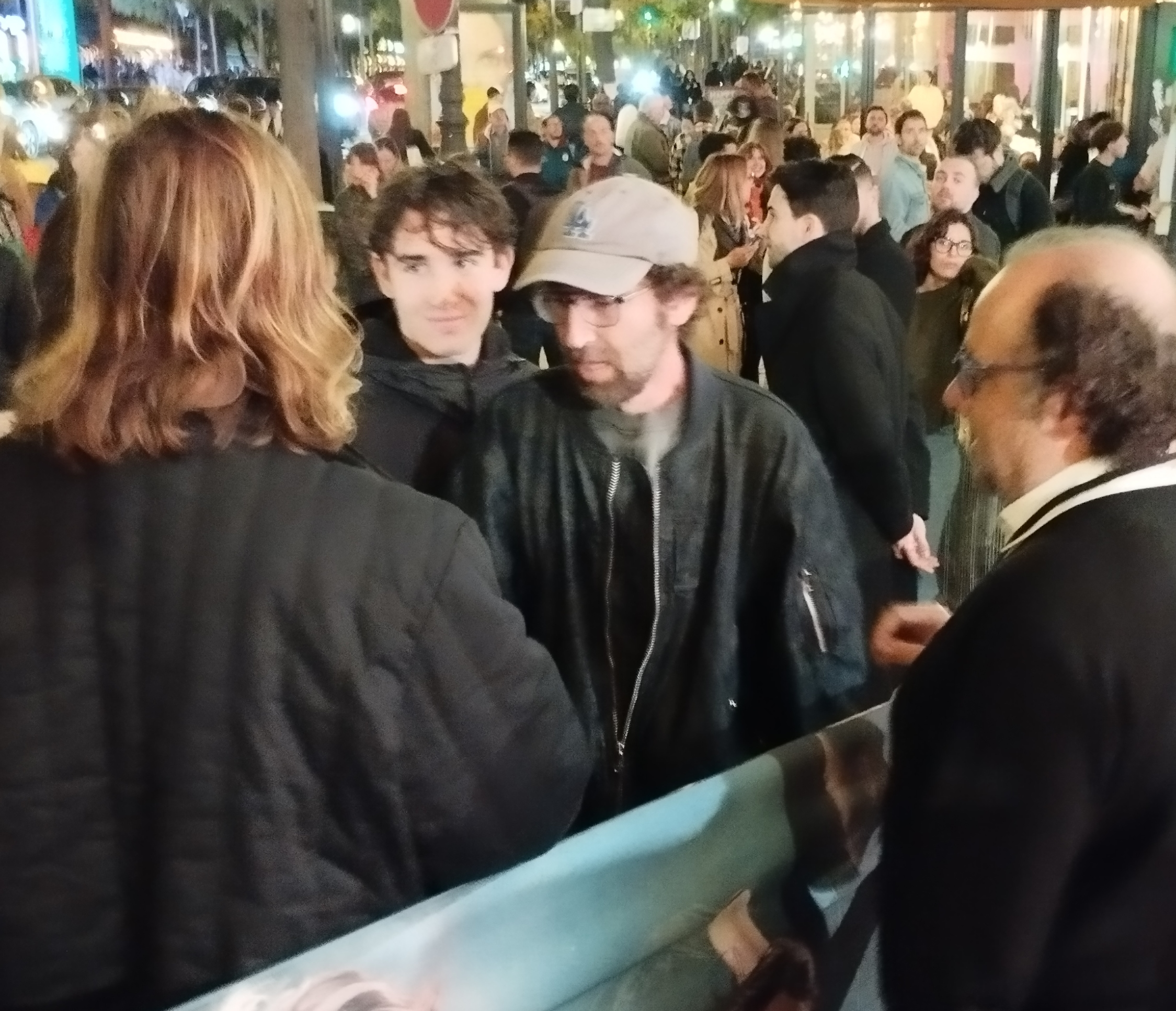
Bangalter (centre right) with his son Roxan (centre left) at the premiere of Yoroï at the Grand Rex, 2025

Bangalter is married to French actress Élodie Bouchez, with whom he has two sons named Tara-Jay (born 2002) and Roxan (born 2008). In 2004, they took up residence in Beverly Hills, California, a decision attributable to Bouchez's Hollywood career and Bangalter's own interests in filmmaking. As of 2013, they live in Paris, while Daft Punk's creative offices remain in Los Angeles.

Regarding his previous anonymity in public, Bangalter has stated, "At some point, it seemed pretentious to continue staying anonymous. I found myself in situations where people apologised for not having photos to ensure I wouldn’t be disturbed. I wasn’t seeking attention, but the anonymity started to attract more attention than it removed."

It was reported that Bangalter had quit DJing in clubs due to developing tinnitus in 2002, saying, "I've given up because I want to protect my ears." Orde Meikle of Slam later stated that Bangalter had sufficiently recovered from the condition, stating that "he had a bit of a scare and thought he'd damaged his ear and had to take obviously reasonably drastic steps to see how bad the damage was".

== Discography ==
=== Solo work ===
EPs and singles

- Trax on da Rocks (1995)
- Spinal Scratch (1996)
- Trax on da Rocks Vol. 2 (1998)
- Outrage (2003)

Soundtracks and scores

- Irréversible (2002) from the film of the same name
- "Riga (Take 5)" (2017) from the film Riga (Take 1)
- "Sangria" (2018) from the film Climax
- "That Night in Brazil" [with Hofesh Shechter] (2022) from the film En Corps
- Mythologies (2023)
- Daaaaaalí! (2024)
- Chiroptera (2024) (music also used in short film An Urban Allegory)
- Mirage (2026)

=== As part of Together ===
- "Together" (2000)
- "So Much Love To Give" (2002)

=== Other appearances ===
Year	Title	Artist	Album	Credit(s)	Notes
1995	"M18"	Manu Le Malin	Memory EP	Composer, producer	Originally credited as featuring "Draft Ponk"
1998	"Music Sounds Better With You"	Stardust	Non-album single	Composer, producer	
1998	"Gym Tonic"	Bob Sinclar	Paradise	Composer, producer	Produced with Bob Sinclar
2000	"Embuscade"	Phoenix	United	Synthesizer	
2002	"Fout La Merde"	113	Dans L'Urgence	Featured artist, vocals	
2004	"Skitzo Dancer (Justice Remix)"	Scenario Rock	Skitzo Dancer	Sound engineer	"Sound polishing by Thomas Bangalter for B.A.S.S."
2017	"Everything Now"	Arcade Fire	Everything Now	Producer, synthesizer	Produced with Arcade Fire, Steve Mackey, Markus Dravs, Eric Heigle
2017	"Signs of Life"	Arcade Fire	Everything Now	Producer	Produced with Arcade Fire, Steve Mackey, Markus Dravs, Eric Heigle
2017	"Electric Blue"	Arcade Fire	Everything Now	Producer	Produced with Arcade Fire, Steve Mackey, Markus Dravs, Eric Heigle
2017	"Put Your Money On Me"	Arcade Fire	Everything Now	Producer, programming	Produced with Arcade Fire, Steve Mackey, Markus Dravs, Eric Heigle
2019	"Supercherie"	-M-	Lettre infinie	Composer, producer	Produced and co-written with -M-
2019	"L'autre paradis"	-M-	Lettre infinie	Composer, producer, synthesizer, choir vocals	Produced and co-written with -M-
2024	"Light Again!"	Lil Nas X	Dreamboy	Composer, producer	Produced with Lil Nas X, Take a Daytrip, Omer Fedi, and Jasper Harris
2025	"Nights Are For Love"	Sons of Raphael	Non-album single	Producer	Produced with Sons of Raphael
2025	"At Dawn I Look For You"	Sons of Raphael	Non-album single	Producer	Produced with Sons of Raphael
2025	"Yoroï"	Orelsan	La fuite en avant	Featured artist, composer, producer, bass	Produced with Orelsan, Skread, and Phazz
