= Daft Punk's Electroma =

2006 avant-garde science fiction film

- Theatrical release poster
- Directed by: Daft Punk
- Written by: Thomas Bangalter; Guy-Manuel de Homem-Christo; Paul Hahn; Cédric Hervet
- Produced by: Paul Hahn
- Starring: Peter Hurteau; Michael Reich
- Cinematography: Thomas Bangalter
- Edited by: Cédric Hervet
- Music by: Todd Rundgren; Brian Eno; Sébastien Tellier; Curtis Mayfield; Linda Perhacs; Jackson C. Frank; Mathieu Tonetti
- Production company: Because Music
- Distributed by: Daft Arts; Wild Bunch; Vice Media
- Release dates: May 21, 2006 (Cannes Film Festival); March 24, 2007 (France)
- Running time: 72 minutes
- Countries: United States; France
- Language: English

Daft Punk's Electroma (also known as Electroma) is a 2006 avant-garde science fiction film directed by the French electronic music duo Daft Punk. The story revolves around the quest of two robots (the band members, played by Peter Hurteau and Michael Reich) to become human.

The music featured in the film is not by Daft Punk, which was a first for the duo after their previous film and home video releases, D.A.F.T.: A Story About Dogs, Androids, Firemen and Tomatoes and Interstella 5555: The 5tory of the 5ecret 5tar 5ystem. The duo instead served as directors and co-wrote the film, along with Daft Arts manager Paul Hahn and collaborator Cédric Hervet.

The film premiered at the 2006 Cannes Film Festival, and was later released in France on March 24, 2007. While initially receiving mixed reviews, Electroma has gained a cult following.

Daft Punk used scenes from the end of the film to announce their break-up on February 22, 2021.

== Plot ==
The two lead characters appear as the robotic forms of Daft Punk and are credited as "Hero Robot No. 1" and "Hero Robot No. 2". One wears a silver helmet and the other wears a golden one. An opening scene shows the duo driving in a 1987 Ferrari 412 with its license plate displaying "HUMAN". After passing through a Southwestern United States landscape, the duo arrives by car at a town in Inyo County, California. The town's residents are also shown to be robots physically identical to the two main characters, but at different ages, with different clothing and alternating gender.

The pair drive to a high-tech facility where liquid latex is poured over their heads. The latex morphs into human-like faces with the aid of prosthetic appliances and wigs. The resulting look caricaturizes the members of Daft Punk, Thomas Bangalter and Guy-Manuel de Homem-Christo. When the two leave the facility, the locals of the town are shocked by their human appearance. The townsfolk gradually begin to chase the duo, whose faces eventually melt in the sun. The two take cover in a public restroom where the gold robot discards his ruined mask, then encourages the reluctant silver robot to do the same. Again appearing as robots, the pair then undergo a lengthy hike across desert salt flats.

After walking for an extended period, the silver robot slows down and comes to a stop. Becoming aware of this, the gold robot walks back to the silver one. The silver robot continues to stare at the ground for a moment before removing his own jacket. He then turns away from the other robot, revealing a switch on his back. The gold robot flips the switch, which begins a timer. When the countdown ends, the silver robot is blown to pieces. The remaining robot piles the remains of the silver robot, then continues to walk. The gold robot eventually falls to his knees and attempts to reach the switch on his own back, but to no avail. Another moment passes before the robot removes his helmet and repeatedly slams it into the ground until the helmet shatters. Using one of the shards as a burning-glass, the robot focuses the sunlight to set his hand ablaze. The film ends as the robot, completely on fire, walks in slow motion through darkness.

== Cast ==
- Peter Hurteau as Hero Robot #1
- Michael Reich as Hero Robot #2
- Ritche Lago Bautista as Robot Groomsman
- Trisha Hershberger as Robot Bride
- Daniel Doble as Robot Pastor
- Athena Stamos as Robot Waitress
- Bradley Schneider as Robot Lawyer

== Production ==
Daft Punk's previous directorial credits include the music videos for their songs "Fresh", "Robot Rock" and "Technologic". The duo initially shot footage for a music video of the song "Human After All", but expanded the content for a feature-length film instead. According to Guy-Manuel de Homem-Christo, Daft Punk's Electroma had been an unplanned extension of filming videos for the Human After All album.

We were not nervous – making a full-length movie was like a dream. We never planned for it to happen, but after we directed the videos for our last album we decided to keep on working. We were in the shooting dynamic, so the movie came naturally. We didn't think too much. Whether it's making music or directing a video, whatever we do we do it quickly. When we have a good work dynamic we don't need to ask too many questions of each other.

Thomas Bangalter stated, "With this film, we had the same approach as when we started making music. Create without any rules or standards. Take a free approach to something new that you don't really know, and that you learn from scratch."

The film was shot on 35 mm Kodak stock under the cinematography of Bangalter. He purchased and read over 200 back-issues of American Cinematographer in preparation for the feature-length picture. Filming of Daft Punk's Electroma spanned 11 days, much of which was spent in California. Many scenes of the film took place in Inyo County along U.S. Route 395 and in the town of Independence. The robotic and makeup effects were designed and created by frequent collaborators Tony Gardner and Alterian, Inc.

In April 2011, the Ferrari 412 used for the film was auctioned for charity, alongside the original 'HUMAN' license plate signed by Bangalter and Homem-Christo.

=== Music ===
The soundtrack for Daft Punk's Electroma does not feature material by Daft Punk. As stated by de Homem-Christo, "We come from a musical background, but this movie is quite minimal." The following songs are featured in the film:

- "International Feel", written and performed by Todd Rundgren
- "In Dark Trees", written and performed by Brian Eno
- "Billy Jack", written and performed by Curtis Mayfield
- "Miserere", written by Gregorio Allegri; performed by A Sei Voci Ensemble
- "Universe", written by Sebastien Tellier and Mathieu Tonetti; performed by Tellier
- "String Quartet in E Flat Major Op. 64, No. 6", written by Joseph Haydn; performed by the Kodaly Quartet
- "If You Were My Man", written and performed by Linda Perhacs
- "No. 4 in E Minor [24 preludes, Op. 28]", written by Fryderyk Chopin; performed by Adam Harasiewicz
- "Dialogue", written and performed by Jackson C. Frank

== Release ==
The film was first shown on May 21, 2006, as part of the Cannes Film Festival sidebar Directors' Fortnight. Midnight screenings of Daft Punk's Electroma were shown in Paris theaters from the end of March 2007. The film was also screened at Biennale de Montréal in Canada on May 11. It was shown in the Australian Centre for the Moving Image on June 7, at the Institute of Contemporary Arts (ICA) in London on June 8 and at Kino Arsenal in Berlin on July 4, 2007. The film went on a screening tour of the United Kingdom, beginning in July 2007 and ending in October at the BBC Electric Proms. The ICA later announced a few late night weekend screenings for November 2007, but based on turnout and interest, extended the screenings to continue until January 2008. In December 2007, the film was shown in Seattle, New York City, Chicago, Los Angeles, Atlanta and Austin as part of a tour of independent film screenings sponsored by the Scion line of Toyota cars. Vice Records sponsored Canadian midnight showings on December 7 in Victoria, Banff, Calgary, Winnipeg, Fort McMurray and Toronto. Further showings in Canada were screened during January 2008 in Toronto, Ottawa and Whitehorse.

The DVD-Video of the film was first released in Australia on June 6, 2007. It is distributed by Aztec International Entertainment. According to the official Daft Punk's Electroma website, it is available in the UK as of November 19, 2007. Vice Records released the North American DVD on July 22, 2008; reports of a Blu-ray Disc release by Vice were later labeled "a mistake" and retracted by the company. The DVD is packaged with a 40-page book of film images in either a SteelBook or slip case. The film became available for online viewing on the Lycos Cinema platform as a rental streamed at either standard or high definition. It is also available for online rental or purchase at the iTunes Store, and for streaming on TIDAL.

On 22 February 2021, Daft Punk released a video titled "Epilogue" on their YouTube channel, featuring scenes from the film. Following a clip in which the pair bid each other farewell in the desert before one of them walks away and explodes, a new title card reads "1993–2021". It was later confirmed that the YouTube video served to announce Daft Punk's breakup.

On 22 February 2026, the fifth anniversary of Daft Punk's disbandment, the official music video for their song "Human After All" was released. It features footage from Electroma edited by Daft Punk's creative director Cédric Hervet. On 8 June 2026, a 4K restoration of Electroma premiered at Tribeca Festival for the film's 20th anniversary, with Hervet and Thomas Bangalter previously announced to appear and actor Michael Reich and makeup/special effects designer and puppeteer Tony Gardner having surprise appearances in a live Q&A after the film's showing.

== Reception ==
Review aggregator Rotten Tomatoes reported that 60% of critics have given the film a positive review based on 5 reviews, with an average rating of 5.50 out of 10. The film's showing at Director's Fortnight was received with mixed reactions. Daft Punk's Electroma was praised for its lensing technique and musical soundtrack at the premiere. At the same time, the film was unfavorably compared with Gus Van Sant's Gerry and Vincent Gallo's The Brown Bunny for its extensive hiking sequence. The scenes involving the main characters' desert trek reportedly caused a large portion of the audience to leave the theater at the Cannes Film Festival showing. In regards to the film's reception, Guy-Manuel de Homem-Christo expressed:

There's a feeling of despair for some, but that's not what we wanted. Because the whole movie is without dialogue, it's more a question than an answer. We wanted to make a question mark so people could project what they wanted onto Electroma – some people see it as sad, some as happy. Everyone is different.

Thomas Bangalter said: "We expected it to be less popular than Discovery, of course. The film is experimental and inaccessible; however, it's a movie that does not require your brain to function."

Reaction to the film's midnight screenings in Paris was reported to be positive as of the end of March 2007. The screenings in the region were so highly received that the film's previously brief run was extended to six months. Most screenings in the United Kingdom sold out quickly. In response to the film's midnight placement, Homem-Christo said, "We are really happy it has become a midnight movie rather than just another movie that will be taken off the screen after one week. Usually, and I think it is the same worldwide, you get all the big blockbusters and if the movie doesn't do good, after one week it is taken off the screen."
