= Daaaaaalí! =

2023 film by Quentin Dupieux

- Theatrical release poster
- Directed by: Quentin Dupieux
- Written by: Quentin Dupieux
- Produced by: Thomas Verhaeghe; Mathieu Verhaeghe
- Starring: Anaïs Demoustier; Gilles Lellouche; Édouard Baer; Jonathan Cohen; Pio Marmaï; Didier Flamand; Romain Duris; Agnès Hurstel
- Cinematography: Quentin Dupieux
- Edited by: Quentin Dupieux
- Music by: Thomas Bangalter
- Production companies: Atelier de Production; France 3 Cinéma
- Distributed by: Diaphana Distribution
- Release dates: 7 September 2023 (Venice); 7 February 2024 (France)
- Running time: 79 minutes
- Country: France
- Language: French
- Budget: €6.7 million
- Box office: $3.9 million

Daaaaaalí! is a 2023 French absurdist comedy film written, directed, shot and edited by Quentin Dupieux. It has been described as a "real fake biopic" about the artist Salvador Dalí.

The film premiered out of competition at the 80th Venice International Film Festival, and was theatrically released on 7 February 2024.

== Premise ==
A French journalist meets with Spanish surrealist artist Salvador Dalí on multiple occasions for an unproductive documentary project.

== Cast ==
- Anaïs Demoustier as Judith Rochant, the journalist
- Gilles Lellouche as Salvador Dalí
- Édouard Baer as Salvador Dalí
- Jonathan Cohen as Salvador Dalí
- Pio Marmaï as Salvador Dalí
- Didier Flamand as Old Salvador Dalí
- Romain Duris as Jérôme, the producer
- Agnès Hurstel as Lucie, the assistant
- Boris Gillot as Autre Dalí
- Marie Bunel as Madame Abravanel, painting buyer
- Nicolas Carpentier as the auctioneer
- Jérôme Niel as the model with the walking stick
- Marc Fraize as the model with the handkerchief
- Jean-Marie Winling as the man on the bus
- Laurent Nicolas as Georges
- Éric Naggar as Jacques, the priest
- Catherine Schaub-Abkarian as Gala Dalí
- Sandrine Blancke as Georges' maid
- Hervé Pauchon as a TV journalist
- Johann Dionnet as Marc, the cameraman
- Tom Dingler as François, the sound engineer
- Angélique Pleau as Josie, the make-up artist
- Matthias Girbig as Fred, the editor
- Victor Assié as the hotel waiter
- Cécile Garcia-Fogel as Bianca
- Philippe Dusseau as Pablo, Dalí's chauffeur
- Max Chabat as the sales actor
- Ken Samuels as the cowboy

== Production ==
The film was produced by Thomas and Mathieu Verhaeghe through Atelier de Production, in co-production with France 3 Cinéma.

On 8 November 2022, Dupieux announced on his Instagram account that principal photography for the film had commenced. The post also revealed a cast including Anaïs Demoustier, Édouard Baer, Gilles Lellouche, Pio Marmaï, Jonathan Cohen, Hakim Jemili, Agnès Hurstel, Jérôme Niel, Marc Fraize and Didier Flamand. Alain Chabat and Pierre Niney were planned as cast members but were ultimately unavailable. It was revealed that Dalí would be portrayed by multiple actors throughout the film. Shooting took place in the Parisian suburb of Saint-Cloud, the south of France, and finally in Spain, where a house on the Costa Brava was staged for the film to evoke Dalí's house in Portlligat. In the Spanish desert, Dupieux also filmed tableaux vivants inspired by two paintings by Dalí: Necrophilic Fountain Flowing from a Grand Piano (1932) and The Average Fine and Invisible Harp (1932). After six weeks, filming officially wrapped on 23 December 2022.

== Release ==
Daaaaaalí! was selected to be screened out of competition at the 80th Venice International Film Festival, where it had its world premiere on 7 September 2023. International sales are handled by Kinology. The film was originally scheduled to be theatrically released on 1 November 2023, but was postponed by Diaphana Distribution to 7 February 2024.

== Soundtrack ==
Daaaaaalí!

Soundtrack album by Thomas Bangalter
- Released: 7 February 2024
- Genres: Acoustic, instrumental
- Length: 10:24
- Label: Ed Banger Records
- Producer: Florian Lagatta

Thomas Bangalter chronology
Mythologies (2023)	Daaaaaalí! (2024)	Chiroptera (2024)

In August 2023, it was confirmed that Thomas Bangalter, formerly of Daft Punk, had composed the score for the film. Bangalter, a friend of Dupieux's, previously made a cameo in Dupieux's 2014 film Reality, a film starring Bangalter's wife Élodie Bouchez. Bangalter and Dupieux wanted the score to be its own "character" in the movie. Bangalter exclusively used an ancient zither as the instrument for the score.

In January 2024, Ed Banger Records announced the release of a limited 10" vinyl EP containing Bangalter's brief original score for the film and a poster for the film. It was released to streaming platforms on 7 February. The limited vinyl edition was released on 9 February 2024.

All music is composed by and performed by Thomas Bangalter.

No.	Title	Length
1.	"Daaaaaalí !"	4:01
2.	"Âge Réel"	6:23
Total length:		10:24

== Reception ==
=== Critical response ===
On the review aggregator website Rotten Tomatoes, 93% of 43 critics' reviews are positive, with an average rating of 7.5/10. The website's consensus reads: "An ideal marriage of director and subject, Quentin Dupieux's Daaaaaali! does justice to the surrealist painter by flouting narrative convention to amusing effect." Metacritic, which uses a weighted average, assigned the film a score of 74 out of 100, based on 9 critics, indicating "generally favorable" reviews. On AlloCiné, the film received an average rating of 3.6 out of 5 stars, based on 37 reviews from French critics.

Sight and Sound critic John Bleasdale concluded, "Dupieux shares with his subject an obstinacy to forge ahead and in so doing attains a silliness that becomes dangerously close to the sublime."
