= Tarik Barri =

Dutch audiovisual composer

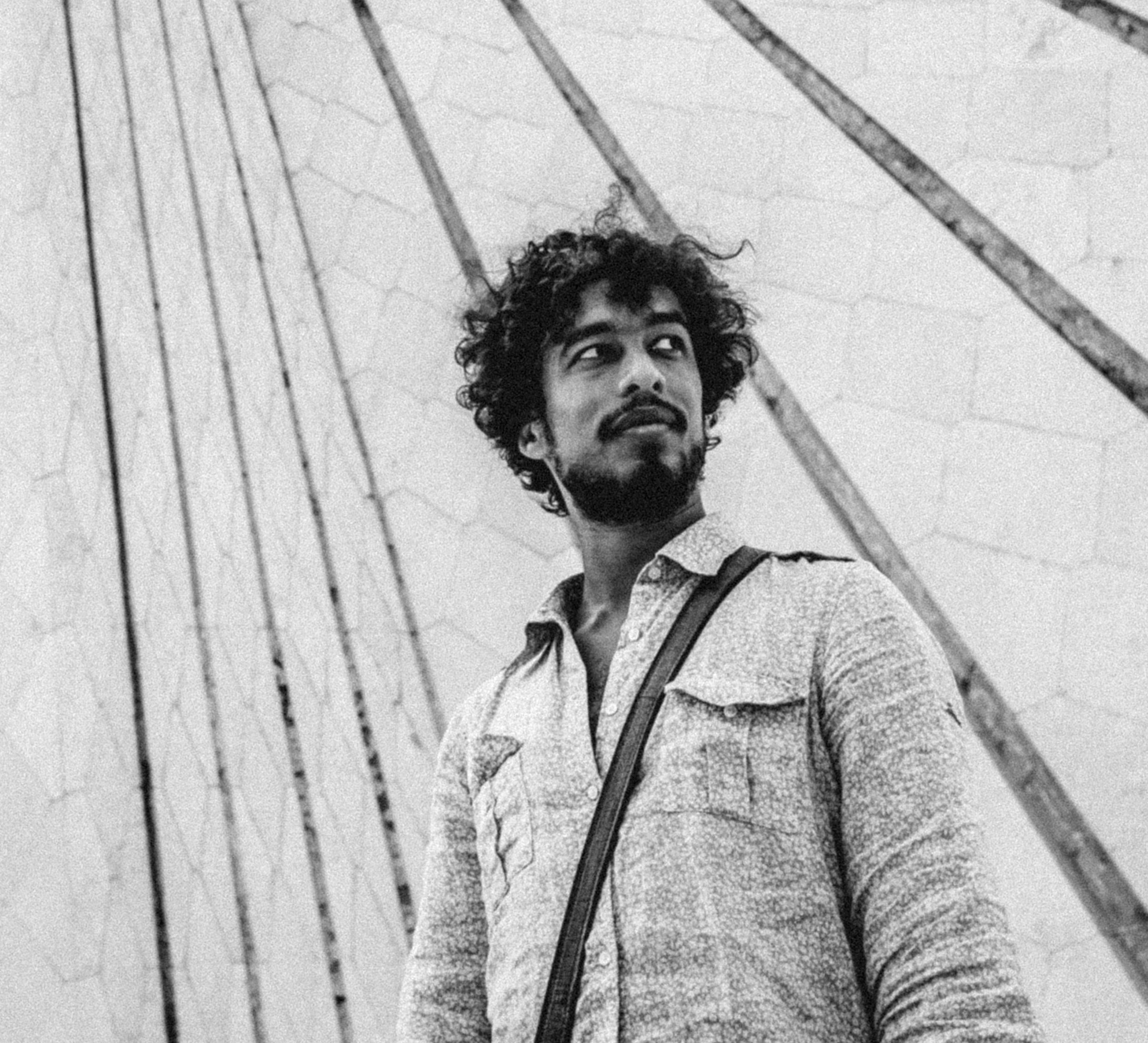
- Born: 1979; Arnhem, the Netherlands
- Known for: Audiovisual art
- Website: tarikbarri.nl

Tarik Barri (born Arnhem, 1979) is a Dutch audiovisual composer based in Berlin. He programmed his own audio-visual software Versum. In this 3D real-time virtual world, the artist creates audio-visual compositions. Barri has collaborated with Radiohead, Atoms for Peace, Nicolas Jaar, Monolake and others.

Starting 2015, he has toured as part of a trio with Thom Yorke and Nigel Godrich in a series of concerts featuring Yorke's Tomorrow's Modern Boxes project.

Since 2022 Barri has been touring on and off with his audiovisual band Zo (together with Lea Fabrikant), Sote and in 2024 with Ben Frost.

== Biography ==
Barri was born in Arnhem, the Netherlands. He lived in Saudi Arabia from 5 until 10. After returning to the Netherlands he initially studied architecture, switched to psychology, and eventually graduated in Audio Design at the Utrecht School of the Arts, after John Peel played one of his songs on the radio.

In 2021 he starts working on Videosync (a visual add-on to Ableton produced by Showsync), after doing a performance with the software together with Peder Mannerfelt in 2019.

== Versum ==
Barri programmed Versum as a tool to create music in 3D. The software is used to build immersive compositions of digital graphics. In 2011, in collaboration with artist Monolake, the software, originally intended to create 3D music, was first used as a purely visual tool to accompany the music. On stage, the visuals are created live, reflecting the skeleton and nuances of sound to and morphing to the music. For example, scenes flicker to a track's pace, and images pulsate to the beat.

== Thom Yorke ==
Barri created the music video for the 2013 single "Judge, Jury and Executioner" by Atoms for Peace, whose members include Thom Yorke and Nigel Godrich. With Godrich, he joined Yorke's solo tours, providing live visuals.

In 2018, Barri collaborated with Yorke on the art installation City Rats at the ISM Hexadome at Berlin's Institute for Sound and Music, a 360-degree audiovisual composition consisting of warped images on six screens with the sound spread over 54 speakers.

In June 2019, Thom Yorke announced the trio will be touring North America to promote his new album Anima. As part of the tour, the trio performed live on the Jimmy Kimmel show. In October it was announced the tour will be extended into 2020.
