= Amok (Atoms for Peace album) =

2013 studio album

Studio album by Atoms for Peace
- Released: February 25, 2013
- Recorded: 2010–2012
- Genre: Electronica
- Length: 44:35
- Label: XL
- Producer: Nigel Godrich

Singles from Amok
- 1. "Default" Released: September 10, 2012; 2. "Ingenue" Released: February 25, 2013; 3. "Judge, Jury and Executioner" Released: March 11, 2013; 4. "Before Your Very Eyes..." Released: July 1, 2013

Amok is the only album by the rock band Atoms for Peace, released on February 25, 2013, by XL Recordings. It features the Radiohead singer Thom Yorke (vocals, keyboards, programming and guitars), the Radiohead producer Nigel Godrich (production and programming), the Red Hot Chili Peppers bassist Flea, the drummer Joey Waronker and the percussionist Mauro Refosco. It combines electronic and live instrumentation.

Yorke formed Atoms for Peace in 2009 to perform songs from his first solo album, The Eraser (2006). After the tour ended, the band spent three days jamming and recording in Los Angeles. Yorke and Godrich edited and arranged the recordings over two years, combining them with Yorke's electronic music.

Four singles were released: "Default", "Ingenue", "Judge, Jury and Executioner" and "Before Your Very Eyes", with music videos for "Ingenue" and "Before Your Very Eyes". Amok reached the top ten in several countries, including the UK, US and Japan. It received generally favourable reviews, though some critics found it too similar to Yorke's solo work. It was followed by an international tour.

== Background and recording ==
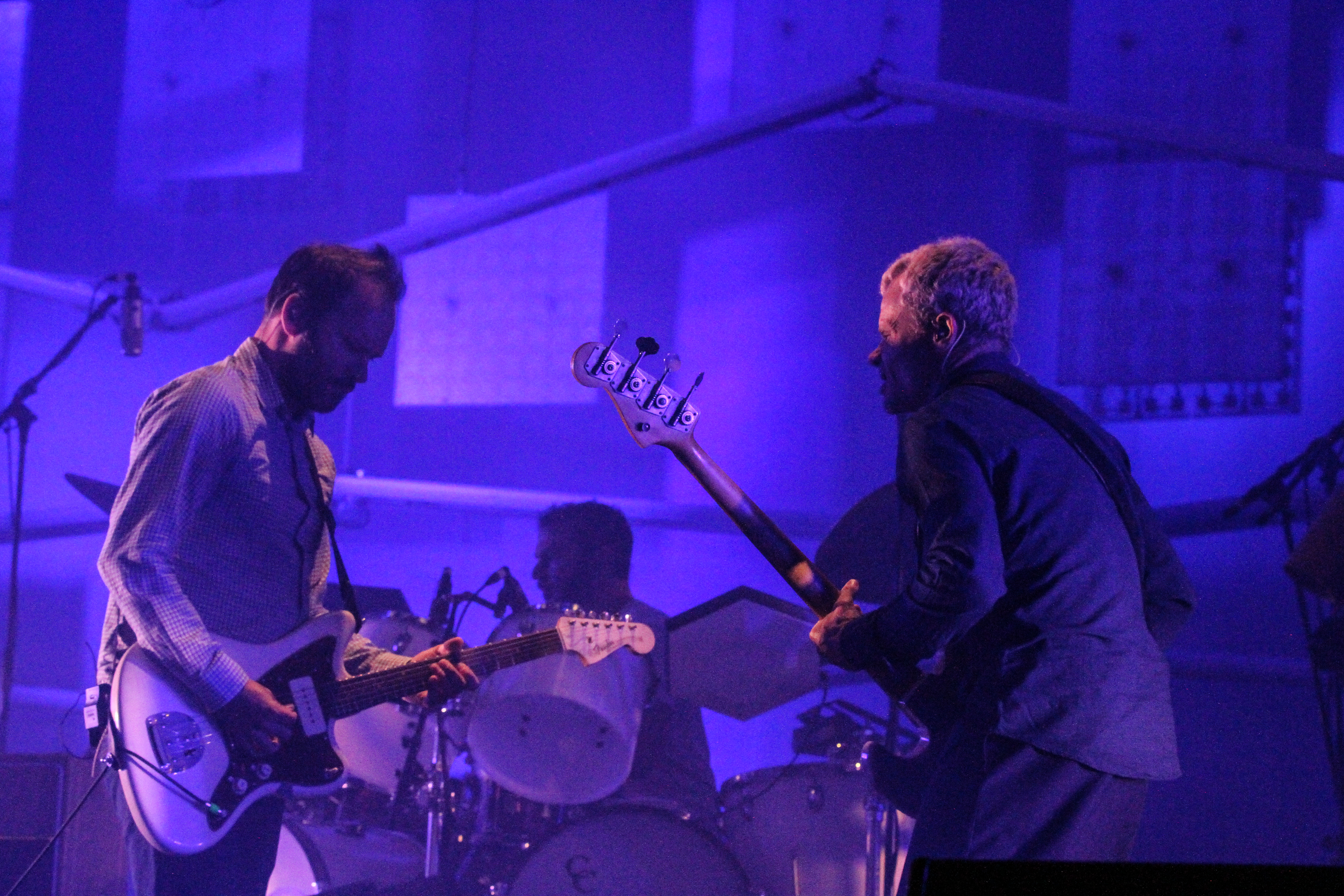
Godrich (left), Waronker (centre) and Flea (right) performing with Atoms for Peace in 2013

The Radiohead songwriter Thom Yorke formed Atoms for Peace in 2009 to perform songs from his first solo album, The Eraser (2006). The band comprises Yorke, the Radiohead producer Nigel Godrich, the bassist Flea of the Red Hot Chili Peppers, the drummer Joey Waronker and the percussionist Mauro Refosco. After the tour ended in 2010, they spent three days jamming and recording original material in a Los Angeles studio. They bonded over a shared love of afrobeat acts such as Fela Kuti.

Describing his role in the sessions as "conducting", Yorke would show the band electronic music he had created and they would recreate it with live instruments. He said: "The music I do on my laptop is so angular. When you get people to play like that, it's so peculiar ... One of the things we were most excited about was ending up with a record where you weren't quite sure where the human starts and the machine ends." Yorke and Godrich edited and arranged the recordings over two years, combining them with Yorke's electronic music.

== Promotion and release ==
Amok was released on February 25, 2013 by XL Recordings. The first single, "Default", was released as a download on September 10, 2012. "Judge, Jury and Executioner", was released as a download on January 7, 2013 and on vinyl on March 19. "Before Your Very Eyes" was released as the third single on July 1. On February 18, Amok was made available to stream from the Atoms for Peace website.

A music video for "Ingenue" was released via YouTube on February 28, 2013. It was directed by Garth Jennings and choreographed by Wayne McGregor, who both had worked with Yorke on the video for the 2011 Radiohead song "Lotus Flower". On October 17, a video for "Before Your Very Eyes" was released, directed by Andrew Thomas Huang. Amok was followed by a tour of Europe, the US and Japan.

Amok reached the top ten in several countries, including the UK, US and Japan. In the US, it was beaten to the number-one spot by Bruno Mars's album Unorthodox Jukebox. Yorke blamed an Amazon promotion selling the Mars album for $1.99, and said: "Amazon fucks with us every time. They undercut us."

== Critical reception ==
Professional ratings
Aggregate scores
Source	Rating
AnyDecentMusic?	7.1/10
Metacritic	76/100
Review scores
Source	Rating
AllMusic	4/5 stars
The A.V. Club	A−
Entertainment Weekly	B
The Guardian	3/5 stars
The Independent	3/5 stars
Los Angeles Times	4/4 stars
NME	8/10
Pitchfork	6.9/10
Rolling Stone	4/5 stars
Spin	6/10

On the review aggregate site Metacritic, Amok has a score of 76 out of 100, indicating "generally favourable reviews". Alexis Petridis of The Guardian wrote that it was technically "hugely impressive ... its sound is rich and deep, full of intriguing shifts and contrasts ... When Amok works, the results are spectacular." However, he felt "the painstaking process used to create it may have assumed a greater importance than the business of actually writing songs".

Sputnikmusic found that Amok sounded like a Yorke solo album, but that "the average listener might find something to enjoy within the dense, layered folds". Slant was disappointed by the similarity to Yorke's work considering the diverse band members, and concluded that Amok was "essentially a collection of agile, minimalist rock songs with a handful of interesting but ultimately superficial electronica flourishes". Pitchfork wrote that while Amok was more "colourful and layered" than The Eraser, it felt "strangely static and contained, giving a perpetual sense of jogging in place".

In a retrospective piece for its 10th anniversary, the Stereogum writer Ryan Leas argued that Amok had failed to distinguish itself, and could be viewed as Yorke's second solo album or a continuation of Radiohead's 2011 album The King of Limbs. He wrote: "For all that went into it Amok was mostly a collection of very good Yorke solo songs — not so much a bold evolution ... Ten years on, it feels as if the 'beginning' Yorke once saw in Atoms For Peace's debut will in fact become a one-off oddity." He suggested that Yorke's later project the Smile presented a truer development of his work.

== Track listing ==
All tracks are written by Atoms for Peace.

No.	Title	Length
1.	"Before Your Very Eyes..."	5:47
2.	"Default"	5:15
3.	"Ingenue"	4:30
4.	"Dropped"	4:57
5.	"Unless"	4:40
6.	"Stuck Together Pieces"	5:28
7.	"Judge, Jury and Executioner"	3:28
8.	"Reverse Running"	5:06
9.	"Amok"	5:24
Total length:		44:35

== Personnel ==
Atoms for Peace

- Thom Yorke – vocals, keyboards, programming, guitars
- Nigel Godrich – production, programming
- Joey Waronker – drums
- Mauro Refosco – percussion
- Flea – bass

Additional personnel

- Darrell Thorp – live recording engineering
- Drew Brown – additional engineering
- Stanley Donwood – artwork ("lost Angeles lost")
- Brian Gardner – mastering

== Chart positions ==
=== Weekly charts ===
Chart (2013)	Peak position
Australian ARIA Albums Chart	11
Austrian Ö3 Albums Chart	18
Belgian Albums Chart (Flanders)	6
Belgian Albums Chart (Wallonia)	14
Canadian Albums Chart	4
Danish Albums Chart	5
Dutch Albums Chart	3
Finnish Albums Chart	14
French SNEP Albums Chart	15
German Albums Chart	16
Irish Albums Chart	12
Irish Independent Albums Chart	3
Italian FIMI Albums Chart	13
Japanese Oricon Albums Chart	9
New Zealand RIANZ Albums Chart	14
Norwegian Albums Chart	6
Portuguese AFP Albums Chart	12
Spanish Albums Chart	22
Swedish Albums Chart	42
Swiss Hitparade Albums Chart	4
UK Albums Chart	5
UK Independent Albums Chart	1
US Billboard 200	2
US Billboard Alternative Albums	1
US Billboard Digital Albums	3
US Billboard Electronic Albums	1
US Billboard Independent Albums	1
US Billboard Rock Albums	1

=== Singles ===
Single	Year	Peak chart positions		
Single	Year	BEL	JAP	UK Indie
"Default"	2012	—	93	31
"Judge, Jury and Executioner"	2013	43	—	—
"Before Your Very Eyes..."	2013	61	—	—
"—" denotes a release that did not chart.
