= Atoms for Peace (band) =

English-American supergroup

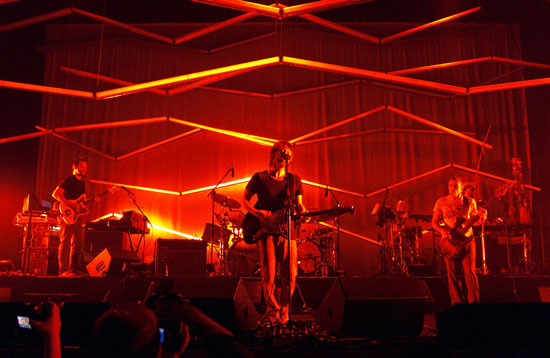
- Atoms for Peace performing in 2010. From left: Nigel Godrich, Thom Yorke, Joey Waronker (behind Yorke), Flea, Mauro Refosco

Background information
- Origin: Los Angeles, California, United States
- Genre: Alternative rock
- Years active: 2009–2013; 2018
- Label: XL
- Spinoffs: Ultraísta
- Spinoff of: Radiohead
- Past members: Thom Yorke; Nigel Godrich; Flea; Joey Waronker; Mauro Refosco
- Website: atomsforpeace.info

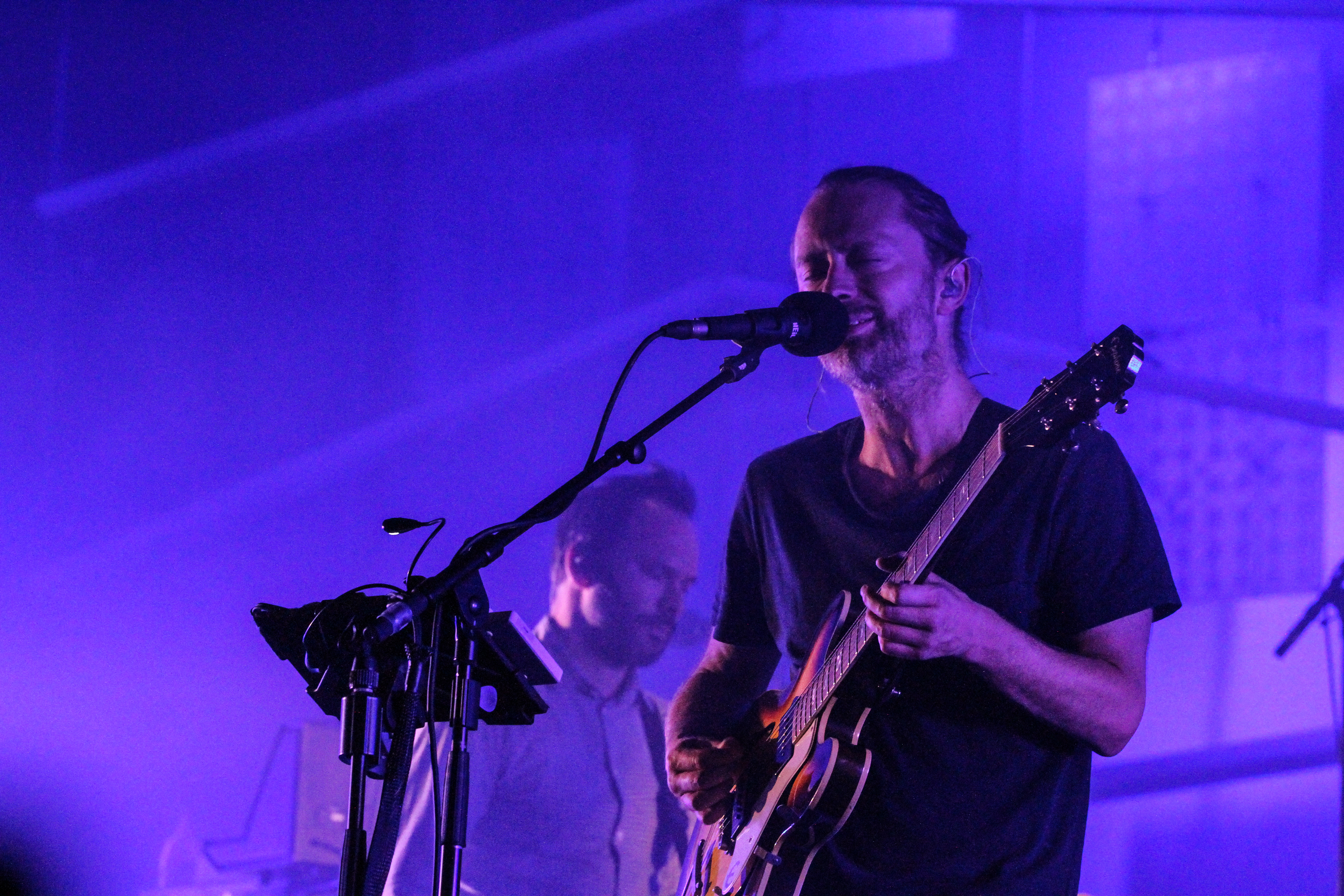
Thom Yorke (front) and Nigel Godrich

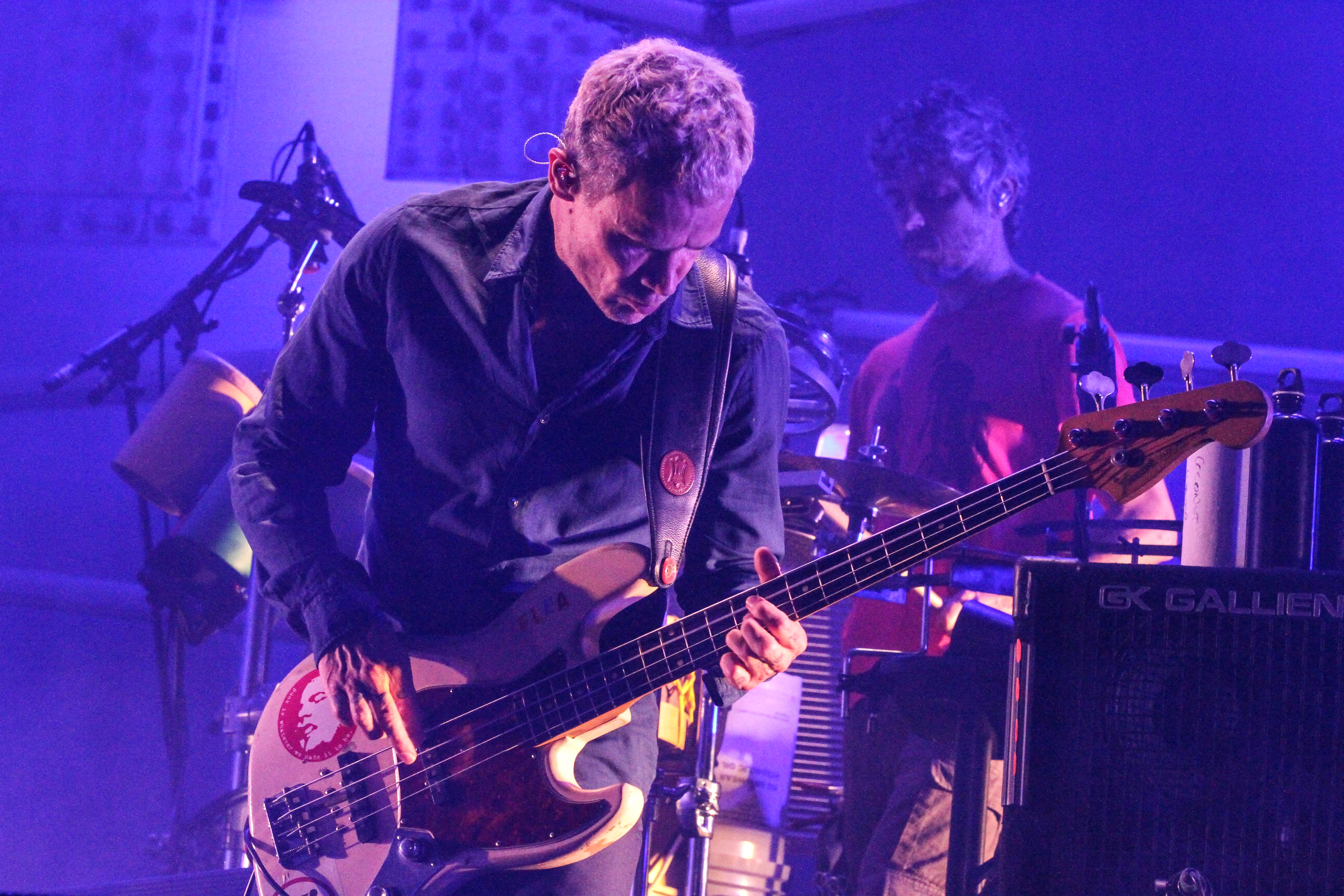
Flea (front) and Mauro Refosco

Atoms for Peace performing at Melt! Festival 2013

Atoms for Peace were an English-American rock supergroup formed in 2009 in Los Angeles, comprising Thom Yorke (vocals, guitar, piano), Flea (bass), Nigel Godrich (keyboards, synthesisers, guitars), Joey Waronker (drums) and Mauro Refosco (percussion).

The band formed to perform songs from Yorke's debut solo album, The Eraser (2006). They played their first shows in October 2009, and toured the US in 2010. In 2013, they released an album, Amok, the product of combining their jamming with Yorke's electronic music. It received positive reviews, with critics likening it to Yorke's solo work. Amok was followed by a tour of Europe, the US and Japan. The band members have collaborated intermittently since.

== History ==
=== 2009—2010: Formation and first shows ===
In 2006, the Radiohead songwriter, Thom Yorke, released his first solo album, The Eraser, comprising mostly electronic music. It was produced by Radiohead's producer, Nigel Godrich. In July 2009, Yorke performed at Latitude Festival in Suffolk and found it was possible to perform Eraser songs on acoustic instruments. He contacted Godrich with the idea of forming a band to perform The Eraser without sequencers, reproducing the electronic beats with Latin percussion.

Yorke and Godrich formed Atoms for Peace in 2009 with the bassist Flea of the Red Hot Chili Peppers; the drummer Joey Waronker, who had performed with acts including Beck and R.E.M; and the percussionist Mauro Refosco, who had performed with acts including David Byrne. Yorke said: "I've been playing with [Radiohead] since I was 16, and to do this was quite a trip ... It felt like we'd knocked a hole in a wall, and we should just fucking go through it."

Yorke announced the band, then unnamed, in September 2009. That October, after three weeks of rehearsals, they played their first shows at Echoplex and the Orpheum Theater in Los Angeles. For early performances, the band was billed as "Thom Yorke" or "??????". In February 2010, they announced the name Atoms for Peace, taken from a song title from The Eraser, which references the 1953 speech by the American president Dwight D. Eisenhower.

In early 2010, Atoms for Peace toured the US, supported by Flying Lotus. The tour included a performance at Coachella. Along with songs from The Eraser, they performed the Radiohead songs "Paperbag Writer" and "Follow Me Around", and Yorke's 1998 collaboration with Unkle, "Rabbit in Your Headlights".

=== 2013: Amok ===
After the tour, Atoms for Peace spent three days jamming and recording in Los Angeles. Yorke and Godrich edited and arranged the recordings over two years, combining it with Yorke's electronic music. This became the band's debut album, Amok, released on February 25, 2013, through XL Recordings. It received mainly positive reviews, with critics likening it to Yorke's solo work.

Amok was followed by a tour of Europe, the US and Japan. The tour included performances of Yorke's 2009 single "FeelingPulledApartByHorses". Atoms for Peace partnered with a British startup, Soundhalo, to sell recordings of the performances. Godrich said he saw Soundhalo as an alternative to low-quality audience recordings on YouTube.

That July, Yorke and Godrich removed Atoms for Peace and Yorke's solo music from the streaming service Spotify. Yorke called Spotify "the last gasp of the old industry", accusing it of only benefiting major labels with large back catalogues, and encouraged artists to build "direct connections" with audiences instead. Atoms for Peace were readded to Spotify in December 2017.

=== Later activity ===
In 2015, Yorke and Flea performed "Atoms for Peace" on the French television show Le Grand Journal and performed "Default" at the United Nations Climate Change Conference in Paris. In 2018, Atoms for Peace reunited without Refosco to perform "Atoms for Peace" at a Yorke show in Los Angeles. Flea played trumpet on Yorke's song "Daily Battles" for the 2019 film Motherless Brooklyn, and Waronker contributed drums to "The Axe" on Yorke's 2019 album Anima. Waronker and Refosco formed the group Jomoro and released their debut album, Blue Marble Sky, on 4 June 2021. Yorke and Refosco contributed to Flea's 2026 album Honora; Flea invited Yorke to contribute to the song "Traffic Lights" as it reminded him of Atoms for Peace. Yorke performed it with Flea as a surprise guest at Flea's show in Koko, London, in May.

== Members ==
- Thom Yorke – lead vocals, guitars, piano, keyboards, percussion
- Flea – bass guitar, melodica, keyboards
- Nigel Godrich – keyboards, synthesisers, guitars, percussion, backing vocals
- Mauro Refosco – percussion, additional drums, marimba
- Joey Waronker – drums

== Discography ==
=== Studio albums ===
List of studio albums, with selected chart positions and sales figures
Title	Album details	Peak chart positions										
Title	Album details	UK	US	BEL (FL)	BEL (WA)	CAN	DEN	FRA	GER	IRL	NLD	SWE
Amok	Released: February 25, 2013; Label: XL Recordings; Format: CD, LP, download	5	2	6	14	4	5	15	16	12	3	42

=== Singles ===
Year	Single	Peak chart positions				Album
Year	Single	UK	UK Indie	BEL	JAP	Album
2012	"Default"	—	31	—	93	Amok
2013	"Judge, Jury and Executioner"	—	—	43	—	Amok
2013	"Before Your Very Eyes..."	—	—	61	—	Amok

=== Music videos ===
Year	Title	Director
2013	"Judge, Jury and Executioner"	Tarik Barri
2013	"Ingenue"	Garth Jennings
2013	"Before Your Very Eyes..."	Andrew Thomas Huang
