= Judge, Jury and Executioner =

Single by Atoms for Peace

from the album Amok
- B-side: "S.A.D."
- Released: 7 January 2013
- Genre: Experimental rock, electronic
- Length: 3:30
- Label: XL
- Songwriter: Atoms for Peace
- Producer: Nigel Godrich

Atoms for Peace singles chronology
"Ingenue" (2013)	"Judge, Jury and Executioner" (2013)	"Before Your Very Eyes..." (2013)

"Judge, Jury and Executioner" is a single by the British-American supergroup Atoms for Peace. The third single from their lone album, Amok, it was released on iTunes on 7 January 2013 and on 12" vinyl on 19 March.

== History ==
Atoms for Peace first performed "Judge, Jury and Executioner" on their US tour in October 2009 and April 2010. It was released as a download on 7 January 2013, after its broadcast on BBC Radio 1. Fans who pre-ordered the album could download the song free. A music video by Tarik Barri was released simultaneously. The limited vinyl version of the single, with an accompanying b-side "S.A.D." was released on March 19, 2013. A live video of the song, recorded at Fuji Rock Festival, was released on the Atoms for Peace website.

The song shares its name with the subtitle of a Radiohead song, "Myxomatosis", released on the 2003 album Hail to the Thief. Yorke said this was accidental, and that he had forgotten he had used the phrase before.

== Reception ==
"Judge, Jury and Executioner" received positive reviews and was likened to Yorke's other work. Will Hermes of Rolling Stone gave it 3.5 stars out of 5, praising "Yorke's swarming choral-style" and Flea's basslines, which he described as "a morph between Flea's instrument and Yorke's humming". Daniel Kreps of Spin depicted the earlier version of the song as "a dark, aggressive centerpiece among the post-Eraser material", whereas the final version was "mellower and more harmonious". Kia Makarechi of The Huffington Post wrote that the song, like Atoms for Peace, is "a sonic extension of Radiohead". David Greenwald of Billboard described the song as "a blend of acoustic and electronic instrumentation, with Yorke's voice floating over wordless background vocals and insistent percussion".

== Track listing ==
No.	Title	Length
1.	"Judge, Jury and Executioner"	3:30
2.	"S.A.D."	5:35
Total length:		9:05
