= Chiroptera (performance art) =

Performance art by JR, Damien Jalet, and Thomas Bangalter

- Artist: JR; Damien Jalet; Thomas Bangalter
- Year: 2023
- Medium: Performance Art
- Location: Paris

Chiroptera was a collaborative performance art installation created by JR, Damien Jalet, and Thomas Bangalter. It was presented in front of the Place de l'Opera to the public on the evening of 12 November 2023.

== Background and performance ==
Chiroptera is the second act of an operatic art series French artist JR has worked on entitled Retour à la caverne. The first act, occurring in September 2023, involved the construction and showing of an art display in front of the Place de l'Opera in Paris, France that made the building appear to be a large cave. A similar cavernous structure was used for the second act. JR considered the project to be an inverse to a traditional opera, with the performance happening in the street exposed to the noise of the city rather than occurring inside.

The music and soundscapes of the performance were created by French composer Thomas Bangalter, formerly of Daft Punk. Bangalter and JR became interested in collaborating when they both worked on Arcade Fire's 2017 album Everything Now. Bangalter, when speaking about the collaboration, said their initial interest in working together more directly sparked due to their shared sentiment and determination to remain independent artists. Bangalter said he focused primarily on breath, imitating women's voices and flute sounds in the sounds and music of the performance. He called the performance "a real purity of human and artistic collaboration," emphasizing the importance of human focused art in modern times. Bangalter would later reunite with JR on La Caverne du Pont Neuf in June 2026, turning the Pont Neuf into a walkable cavernous structure akin to what was created for Chiroptera. Bangalter provided the soundscape for the art installation.

On the night of the show, over 150 dancers, choreographed by Damien Jalet and led by ballet dancer Amandine Albisson, danced on the structure across multiple floors, wearing white and black costumes that could create the appearance of words via coordinated movement. The demonstration was produced and created in partnership with the fashion house Chanel, with dancers wearing costumes made by the company. Jalet said that, due to safety, each dancer had to stay within the confines of their own scaffolding section and could not see what the other dancers were doing at any given time. The collaboration between Jalet and Bangalter led to the two working together on the 2025 ballet Mirage.

The performance was free to the public and occurred twice on the evening of 12 November 2023, happening in front of over twenty thousand individuals. A large focus of the installation was the contrast between darkness and light. The installation was created using minimal lighting, with attendees being encouraged to bring flashlights and headlamps. The art structure remained on display two weeks after the night of the performance and was taken down 25 November 2023.

JR and filmmaker Alice Rohrwacher co-directed a 2024 short film connected to the themes of Retour à la caverne and Chiroptera titled An Urban Allegory. The short film is also scored by Bangalter and choreographed by Jalet.

== Music ==
Chiroptera

Soundtrack album by Thomas Bangalter
- Released: 7 June 2024
- Genres: Electronic, ambient
- Length: 17:03
- Label: Because Music
- Producer: Thomas Bangalter

Thomas Bangalter chronology
Daaaaaalí! (2024)	Chiroptera (2024)	Mirage (2026)

The soundtrack released in June 2024 on streaming platforms and on vinyl in August. It is Bangalter's third release under his solo label Alberts & Gothmaan, formed after the end of Daft Punk, following Bangalter's music for the ballet Mythologies and the film Daaaaaalí!.

The streaming release coincided with another art installation, Dans La Lumiere, displaying art prints made by JR related to Chiroptera at the Perrotin gallery in France. Another sound installation by Bangalter featuring the sounds of Chiroptera called Aletheia 19 was present for the first week of Dans La Lumiere.

All tracks are written by Thomas Bangalter.

No.	Title	Length
1.	"Chiroptera"	12:00
2.	"Chiroptera (Solo Intro)"	5:03
Total length:		17:03

Alongside the finished music of the performance, a nearly six-hour track of raw music materials by Bangalter was released to streaming as well. The six-hour track titled "Chiroptera Matiere Premiere," was released physically in a boxset, with the track being spread across ten vinyl discs. The boxset, limited to 200 copies worldwide, was initially only available for sale at the installation at Perrotin. Remaining copies were sold online the following week.

No.	Title	Length
1.	"Chiroptera Matiere Premiere"	5:51:26
Total length:		5:51:26

Soundtrack Personnel

- Thomas Bangalter – composition, performance, production
- Florian Lagatta – sound engineer, music recording
- Benjamin Weber - mastering engineer
- JR - cover art
- Cédric Hervet – design, layout
