= Pavillon Noir =

Choreographic center in Aix-en-Provence, France

Coordinates: 43.5254°N 5.4401°E

- Interactive map of the Pavillon Noir area

General information
- Location: 530 avenue Mozart, Aix-en-Provence, France
- Construction started: 2004
- Completed: 2006

Design and construction
- Architect: Rudy Ricciotti

The Pavillon Noir is a choreographic center in Aix-en-Provence, France.

== Location ==
The Pavillon Noir is located at 530 avenue Mozart in Aix-en-Provence. It is near the Bibliothèque Méjanes.

== History ==
The building was designed by Algerian-born French architect Rudy Ricciotti. Its construction began in 2004 and it was completed in 2006. It is made of steel and concrete. According to its officially website, it has "four rehearsal studios and one performance hall with 378 seats."

It was built especially to be the main rehearsal and performance center of the Ballet Preljocaj, a dance company choreographed by Angelin Preljocaj.
