= Rudy Ricciotti =

French architect and publisher (born 1952)

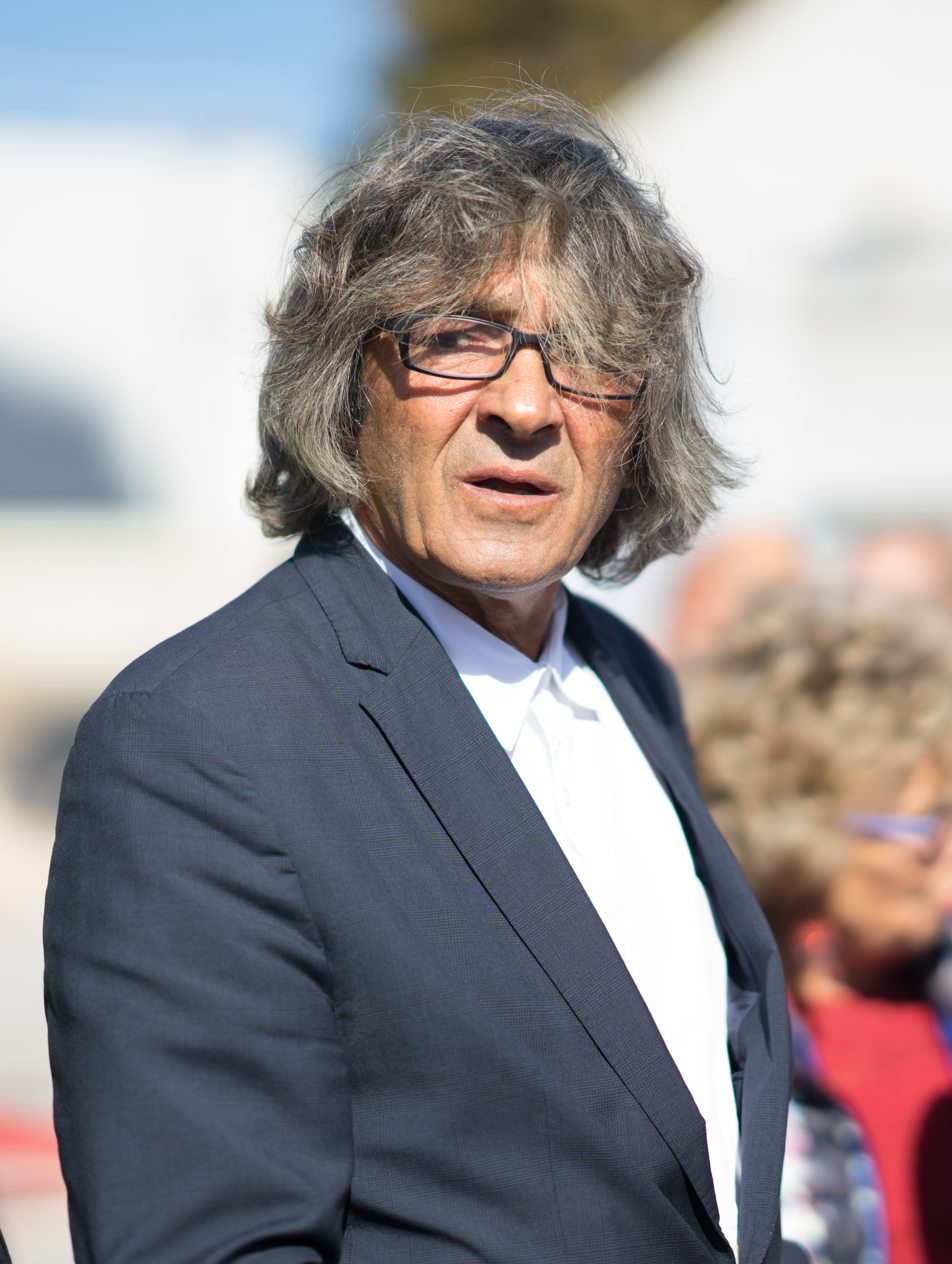
- Ricciotti in 2018
- Born: 22 August 1952 (age 73); Algiers, Algeria
- Education: École Nationale Supérieure d’Architecture de Marseille
- Occupations: Architect, book publisher

Rudy Ricciotti (born 22 August 1952) is a French architect and publisher.

== Biography ==
=== Early life ===
He was born in Kouba district of Algiers in Algeria of Italian origin on 22 August 1952 and moved to France at the age of three. He studied engineering in Switzerland and he graduated from the École Nationale Supérieure d’Architecture de Marseille in 1980.

=== Career ===
He has designed the Musée des Civilisations de l'Europe et de la Méditerranée (MUCEM) in Marseille, Pavillon Noir in Aix-en-Provence, Villa Navarra in Le Muy, the Jean Cocteau Museum in Menton, Les Arts Gstaad in Gstaad the International Center of Art and Culture in Liège, Belgium. He worked on an exhibition in the Louvre with Mario Bellini in 2012. In 2015, he designed the 'Man and the Sea' museum on the Antoine 1er dock in Monaco.

He abhors minimalism. He supports the "demuseumification of museums."

He runs a small publishing house, Al Dante, which publishes photography, essays on architecture, and poetry, including a French translation of John Ashbery.

He is a recipient of the Legion of Honor, the Order of Arts and Letters and the National Order of Merit.

=== Personal life ===
He lives in Cassis and has an office in Bandol. He collects rare books.

=== Controversy ===
==== MUCEM ====
In February 2015, the French Court of Auditors ("la Cour des comptes") pointed out "a laborious gestation" with a final cost of €350 million (studies, construction...) instead of €160 million originally planned for the Musée des Civilisations de l'Europe et de la Méditerranée in Marseille.

==== His villa in Cassis (France) ====
On Wednesday, 17 October 2018, Rudy Ricciotti has been heard at the Criminal Court of Toulon for unauthorized work on his property between 2010 and 2012, when he hired workers off the books. His villa is located in the “Parc national des Calanques”, in Cassis, on a natural area classified. He had turned a dovecote from the seventies into a screening room.

On 23 November 2018, the Criminal Court of Toulon convicted him to a four months suspended sentence and a fine of €150,000.

However and luckily for him, this sentence will not be registered into his criminal record. This allows him to still fulfill orders and to participate to public architectural competitions.

The contractor was sentenced to a fine of 120 000 Euros and his villa has been seized.

== Bibliography ==
- Blitzkrieg : De la culture comme arme fatale (with Salvatore Lombardo, Transbordeurs, 2005).
- HQE (Le Gac Press, 2013).
- L'architecture est un sport de combat (with David d'Equainville, Editions Textuel, 2013, 112 pages).
- A. Pergoli Campanelli, Point ultime - Rudy RICCIOTTI les interviews al vitriol dun sudiste Paris, Sens & Tonka, 1998, pp. 115–125, ISBN 2-910170-62-4

== Documentaries ==
- Le projet Navarra (dir. Joël Yvon, 2007, 26 minutes).
- L'Orchidoclaste (dir. Laetitia Masson, 2013, 52 minutes).
