= Irréversible (soundtrack) =

Soundtrack album by Thomas Bangalter
- Released: 24 June 2002
- Recorded: 1995–2002
- Length: 72:38
- Labels: Roulé; Thrive
- Producer: Thomas Bangalter

Thomas Bangalter chronology
Trax on da Rocks Vol. 2 (1998)	Irréversible (2002)	Outrage (2003)

Singles from Irréversible
- 1. "Outrage / Night Beats / Paris by Night" Released: 6 March 2003

Professional ratings
Review scores
Source	Rating
AllMusic	3.5/5 stars
Pitchfork	(6.0/10)

Irréversible (Original Soundtrack From The Motion Picture) is the soundtrack album to the film of the same name, as well as a solo album by Thomas Bangalter. The album was produced by Bangalter, who is best known for being one-half of the French house duo Daft Punk. The tracks "Outrun" and "Extra Dry" were featured on the Midnight Club II soundtrack. North American pressings of the soundtrack are marketed as a Bangalter solo album and omit the Mahler, Daho and Beethoven selections. "Outrun" and "Ventura" were previously released on Bangalter's Trax on da Rocks EP while "Extra Dry" had appeared in Trax on da Rocks Vol. 2, and "Spinal Scratch" had been a non-album single.

== Track listings ==
All music is composed by Bangalter except where noted.

No.	Title	Music	Length
1.	"Irréversible"		6:32
2.	"Tempus Edax Rerum"		1:14
3.	"Symphony n°9 in D Major – Adagio" (Excerpt)	Gustav Mahler	1:49
4.	"Rectum"		6:23
5.	"Night Beats"		2:17
6.	"Stress"		6:41
7.	"Paris by Night"		6:05
8.	"Outrage"		6:29
9.	"Outrun"		5:42
10.	"Spinal Scratch"		6:29
11.	"Extra Dry"		4:57
12.	"Désaccords"		3:48
13.	"Ventura / Into The Tunnel"		5:47
14.	"Mon Manège à moi"	Étienne Daho	3:51
15.	"Symphony n°7 in A Major Op. 92" (Excerpt)	Ludwig van Beethoven	3:23
16.	"The End"		1:11
Total length:			72:38

=== North American version ===
No.	Title	Length
1.	"Irréversible"	6:32
2.	"Tempus Edax Rerum"	1:14
3.	"Rectum"	6:23
4.	"Night Beats"	2:17
5.	"Stress"	6:41
6.	"Paris by Night"	6:05
7.	"Outrage"	6:29
8.	"Outrun"	5:42
9.	"Spinal Scratch"	6:29
10.	"Extra Dry"	4:57
11.	"Désaccords"	3:48
12.	"Ventura / Into The Tunnel"	5:47
13.	"The End"	1:11
Total length:		63:36
