= Anima (Thom Yorke album) =

2019 studio album

Studio album by Thom Yorke
- Released: 27 June 2019
- Genre: Electronic
- Length: 47:44
- Label: XL
- Producer: Nigel Godrich

Thom Yorke chronology
Suspiria (2018)	Anima (2019)	Confidenza (2024)

Anima is the third studio album by the English musician Thom Yorke, released on 27 June 2019 through XL Recordings. It was produced by Yorke's longtime collaborator Nigel Godrich.

Anima comprises electronic music developed through live performances and studio work, with themes of anxiety and dystopia. It was accompanied by a short film directed by Paul Thomas Anderson, which was released on Netflix and in select IMAX theatres, and a music video for "Last I Heard (...He Was Circling the Drain)". Yorke embarked on an international tour to support the album; later dates were cancelled due to the COVID-19 pandemic.

Anima became Yorke's first number-one album on the Billboard Dance/Electronic Albums chart. It was nominated for Best Alternative Music Album and Best Boxed or Special Limited Edition Package at the 2020 Grammy Awards, while the Anima film was nominated for the Grammy for Best Music Film. Both received positive reviews. Anima was followed by the Not the News Rmx EP, featuring an extended version of "Not the News" plus remixes.

== Writing and recording ==
Yorke wrote Anima following a period of writer's block and anxiety. Inspired by seeing the electronic musician Flying Lotus improvising live with loops, Yorke and his longtime collaborator Nigel Godrich developed Anima through live performances and studio work. Yorke would send Godrich "sprawling" unfinished tracks and Godrich would edit them into shorter samples and loops, which Yorke wrote vocals to.

Yorke performed several Anima tracks, including "Not the News", while on tour for his previous album, Tomorrow's Modern Boxes (2014). Philip Selway, the drummer for Yorke's band Radiohead, contributed "sped-up drums" to "Impossible Knots". Joey Waronker, the drummer for Yorke's project Atoms for Peace, appears on the end of "The Axe".

== Music and lyrics ==
Anima comprises electronic music with "layers of electronic fuzz and deconstructed noise". Pitchfork characterised it as "full of wraithlike frequencies and fibrillating pulses". Yorke said its themes include anxiety and dystopia; he felt that dystopian environments were "a really good way of expressing anxiety creatively". The title Anima, a reference to the psychoanalyst Carl Jung's concepts of the anima and animus, came from Yorke's interest in dreams.

The Independent likened the opening track, "Traffic", to the "heady grooves and pulses" of the electronic artist Floating Points. "Dawn Chorus" is a "reverential song about loss, nostalgia, and regret" with "hushed", almost-spoken vocals. The "Not the News" melody resembles a ticking clock and builds to a "mass of chaotic orchestration". "Impossible Knots" features a "propulsive electric bassline". The final track, "Runwayaway", has "trance-like" blues guitar.

== Film ==
Anima was accompanied by a 15-minute film directed by Paul Thomas Anderson. It was played in some IMAX theatres and released on Netflix on the day of the album release. The film features Yorke's partner, the actress Dajana Roncione, plus choreography by Damien Jalet, cinematography by Darius Khondji and projections by Tarik Barri. In the film, Yorke rides a train of uniformed passengers ("Not the News"), meets the eye of a woman (Roncione) and pursues her when she forgets her bag ("Traffic"). They meet in the street, dance together and board a tram ("Dawn Chorus").

The film began with a concept from Yorke about workers whose "bodies don't work any more" and are being "pushed by an invisible force". The team wanted the first sequence to be "oppressive and hyper-precise so it feels like a machine", influenced by dystopian stories such as Nineteen Eighty-Four and Metropolis and the physical comedy of Charlie Chaplin. For the "Traffic" sequence, the team created a platform inclined at a 34-degree angle and placed the camera at the same angle, erasing the slope.

On the review aggregator website Rotten Tomatoes, 100% of 21 critics' reviews are positive, with an average rating of 8.1/10. The website's consensus reads: "Thom Yorke's eerie compositions blend perfectly with Paul Thomas Anderon's ethereal direction to form a bewitching meditation on alienation and what it means to connect." It was nominated for Best Music Film at the 2020 Grammy Awards.

== Release ==
Anima was promoted with a viral marketing campaign. In June 2019, posters in cities around the world appeared advertising "Anima Technologies", a company claiming to be able to recover lost dreams with a "dream camera". Calling the advertised number led to a prerecorded message advising that Anima Technologies had been "seized" after "unlawful activities", followed by part of the track "Not the News". This was followed by projections on London landmarks.

Yorke announced Anima on social media on 20 June. It was released as a download and on streaming services on 27 June 2019, followed by CD and vinyl editions on 19 July 2019. The vinyl edition includes a bonus track, "Ladies & Gentlemen, Thank You For Coming". On 2 August, Yorke released the Not the News Rmx EP on digital platforms, comprising an extended version of "Not the News" plus remixes by Mark Pritchard, Clark and Equiknoxx. A limited-edition white-label vinyl version followed. A music video for "Last I Heard (...He Was Circling the Drain)", blending 16mm, 3D and cel animation, was released on 30 October.

To support Anima, Yorke embarked on an international tour, performing with Godrich and the visual artist Tarik Barri. A North American tour was due to begin in March 2020, but was cancelled due to the COVID-19 pandemic. The electronic musician Jon Hopkins released a piano cover of "Dawn Chorus" in December 2020.

== Sales ==
Anima entered at number 50 on the UK Albums Chart, and re-entered at number five following its retail release three weeks later. It was Yorke's tenth UK top-ten album (including his work with Radiohead), and his second top-ten solo album (after his 2006 album The Eraser). Anima became Yorke's first number-one album on the Billboard Dance/Electronic Albums chart, selling 10,000 album-equivalent units in the week ending July 25, nearly all from traditional sales. "Traffic" was Yorke's first entry on the Dance/Electronic Songs chart, and reached number 47.

== Critical reception ==
Professional ratings
Aggregate scores
Source	Rating
AnyDecentMusic?	8.0/10
Metacritic	84/100
Review scores
Source	Rating
AllMusic	3.5/5 stars
The Daily Telegraph	5/5 stars
The Guardian	3/5 stars
The Independent	4/5 stars
Mojo	4/5 stars
NME	4/5 stars
The Observer	4/5 stars
Pitchfork	8.3/10
Q	4/5 stars
Rolling Stone	4/5 stars

At Metacritic, which assigns a normalised rating out of 100 to reviews from mainstream critics, Anima has an average score of 84, based on 28 reviews, which indicates "universal acclaim". Philip Sherburne of Pitchfork awarded it the week's "Best New Music", writing that it was Yorke's most ambitious and assured solo album and the first that felt complete without Radiohead. Pitchfork named "Dawn Chorus" the seventh-best song of 2019.

The Guardian critic Alexis Petridis observed "a preponderance of dance rhythms" but "very little of dance music's propulsive dynamics", and felt the melodies were "fragmentary and vaporous". He concluded that Anima was "like a glimpse through an artist's sketchbook, interesting rather than essential". At the 2020 Grammy Awards, Anima was nominated for Best Alternative Music Album and Best Boxed or Special Limited Edition Package.

=== Accolades ===
Accolades for Anima
Publication	List	Rank
Afisha Daily (Russia)	The Best Foreign Albums of 2019	14
GQ (Russia)	The 20 Best Albums of 2019	—N/a

== Track listing ==
All lyrics are written by Thom Yorke; all music is composed by Nigel Godrich and Thom Yorke.

Anima track listing
No.	Title	Length
1.	"Traffic"	5:16
2.	"Last I Heard (...He Was Circling the Drain)"	5:06
3.	"Twist"	7:03
4.	"Dawn Chorus"	5:23
5.	"I Am a Very Rude Person"	3:44
6.	"Not the News"	3:56
7.	"The Axe"	7:00
8.	"Impossible Knots"	4:20
9.	"Runwayaway"	5:56
Total length:		47:44

Vinyl bonus track
No.	Title	Length
10.	"(Ladies & Gentlemen, Thank You For Coming)"	4:55
Total length:		52:39 (LP)

== Personnel ==
Credits adapted from the liner notes of Anima.

=== Additional musicians ===
- Joey Waronker – drums at the end of "The Axe"
- Philip Selway – sped-up drums on "Impossible Knots"
- London Contemporary Orchestra and Choir
  - Hugh Brunt – conducting, orchestrations
  - Talia Morey – copy
  - Galya Bisengalieva (leader), Alessandro Ruisi, Zara Benyounes, Alexandra Caldon, Venetia Jollands, Patrick Savage, Anna Ovsyanikova, Marianne Haynes – first violins
  - Eloisa-Fleur Thom, Emily Holland, Gillon Cameron, Guy Button, Nicole Stokes, Francesca Barritt, Violeta Barreña, Ed McCullagh – second violins
  - Ian Anderson, Clifton Harrison, Matt Kettle, Matthew Maguire, Diana Matthews, Alison D'Souza, Jenny Lewisohn, Meghan Cassidy – violas
  - Brian O'Kane, Reinoud Ford, Jonny Byers, Gregor Riddell, Zoe Martlew, Sergio Serra – cellos
  - Dave Brown, Roger Linley, Laurence Ungless, Gwen Reed – double basses
  - Pasha Mansurov (solo: piccolo, alto and bass), Zinajda Kodrič (II: alto and bass), Gareth Mclearnon (III: alto, bass and contrabass) – flutes
  - Craig Apps, Zands Duggan, Louise Anna Duggan – percussion
  - Josephine Stephenson, Héloïse Werner, Fiona Fraser, Harriet Armston-Clarke, Laurel Neighbour, Eleanor Gregory – sopranos
  - Rose Martin, Katie Schofield, Amy Lyddon, Emma Lewis, Lissie Paul, Judy Brown – altos

=== Technical personnel ===
- Nigel Godrich – production
- Bob Ludwig – mastering

=== Artwork ===
- Stanley Donwood – artwork ("graphite")
- Thom Yorke (credited as Tchocky) – artwork ("graphite")

== Charts ==
Weekly sales chart performance for Anima
Chart (2019)	Peak position
Australian Albums (ARIA)	23
Austrian Albums (Ö3 Austria)	19
Belgian Albums (Ultratop Flanders)	10
Belgian Albums (Ultratop Wallonia)	21
Canadian Albums (Billboard)	58
Dutch Albums (Album Top 100)	12
French Albums (SNEP)	33
German Albums (Offizielle Top 100)	21
Irish Albums (IRMA)	19
Italian Albums (FIMI)	15
Japan Hot Albums (Billboard Japan)	29
Japanese Albums (Oricon)	14
Lithuanian Albums (AGATA)	24
New Zealand Albums (RMNZ)	27
Polish Albums (ZPAV)	35
Portuguese Albums (AFP)	5
Scottish Albums (Official Charts)	4
South Korean Albums (Gaon)	86
Spanish Albums (Promusicae)	13
Swiss Albums (Schweizer Hitparade)	12
UK Albums (Official Charts)	5
US Billboard 200	59
US Top Dance Albums (Billboard)	1

=== Year-end charts ===
Annual sales chart performance for Anima
Chart (2019)	Position
US Independent Albums	36
