= Default (Atoms for Peace song) =

Single by Atoms for Peace

from the album Amok
- B-side: "What the Eyeballs Did"
- Released: 19 November 2012
- Genre: Electronic; IDM
- Length: 5:16
- Label: XL
- Songwriter: Atoms for Peace
- Producer: Nigel Godrich

Atoms for Peace singles chronology
"Default" (2012)	"Ingenue" (2013)

"Default" is the debut single by the English-American supergroup Atoms for Peace. It was released as a download on 10 September 2012 and on 12" vinyl on 4 December 2012. It was the first non-remixed track released by the band and featured on their debut album, Amok.

== History ==
While scheduled for release on 10 September 2012, "Default" was made available for sale on iTunes on 6 September. At this point, Thom Yorke announced on the Radiohead website details of the song's release. On 26 September, details of the vinyl release were announced, stating that the track "What the Eyeballs Did" would serve as the single's B-side.

== Track listing ==
No.	Title	Length
1.	"Default"	5:15
2.	"What the Eyeballs Did"	4:03
3.	"Default (Instrumental Edit)"	4:14
Total length:		13:32
