= Mythologies (ballet) =

French ballet performance/album

- Choreographer: Angelin Preljocaj
- Music: Thomas Bangalter
- Premiere: 1 July 2022; Grand-Théâtre de Bordeaux
- Original ballet company: Ballet Preljocaj & Ballet de l'Opéra de Bordeaux
- Design: Adrien Chalgard
- Type: Classical ballet

Mythologies is a 2022 ballet created by the French choreographer Angelin Preljocaj and composer Thomas Bangalter. The ballet focuses on scenes stemming from human mythologies and features original orchestral compositions from Bangalter.

== Conception ==
The ballet started as a collaboration between the Ballet Preljocaj and Ballet de l'Opéra de Bordeaux. Another ballet, Ghost, was created by the two companies in 2018. Mythologies uses ten participating dancers from each ballet.

In late 2019, Preljocaj approached Bangalter about composing a ballet suite with a full orchestra. Bangalter had previously hoped to compose classical music in such a setting, so a collaboration begun between the two that resulted in what would become the opera.

== Synopsis ==
Mythologies, led by twenty dancers, connects ancient and modern myths. The ballet focuses on "contemporary rituals" and revolves around twenty-three scenes inspired by "founding myths that shape the collective imagination".

== Music ==
Mythologies

Soundtrack album by Thomas Bangalter
- Released: 7 April 2023
- Recorded: 11–13 July 2022
- Genre: Classical
- Length: 89:02
- Label: Erato
- Producer: Thomas Bangalter

Thomas Bangalter chronology
Outrage (2003)	Mythologies (2023)	Daaaaaalí! (2024)

Singles from Mythologies
- 1. "X. L'Accouchement" Released: 27 January 2023; 2. "XIII. Le Minotaure" Released: 24 February 2023; 3. "XVIII. Pas de Deux" Released: 17 March 2023; 4. "XIX. Circonvolutions (Remix)" Released: 28 May 2026

The music to the ballet was composed by Thomas Bangalter, formerly of Daft Punk.

Unlike the work of the duo and of Bangalter in earlier previous solo efforts, the album is not electronic and is entirely orchestral, focusing on Baroque music and American minimalism. Preljocaj initially suggested the idea of Bangalter using electronic elements with symphonic music, similar to Bangalter's previous work as part of Daft Punk for the film Tron: Legacy. However, Bangalter expressed the desire to write a fully orchestral score in order to have a more unique experience. Bangalter studied and read classic treatises on orchestration and abandoned writing with the keyboard, how he normally wrote compositions with Daft Punk, to avoid limitations in composing.

The 90-minute composition was released as an album of the same name in April 2023 on vinyl, CD, and streaming services. Bangalter was unsure whether he would release the project as an album when writing, but he decided to when he and Preljocaj were very satisfied with the result. It is the first solo project from either Bangalter or Guy-Manuel de Homem-Christo following their split and the first full-length album involving either member in a decade. Bangalter gave interviews about the project and allowed himself to be photographed without a mask. The press release of the album included a drawing of Bangalter's unmasked face by Vulture Magazine illustrator Stéphane Manel. The album was preceded by three singles. A remix of "XIX. Circonvolutions" was released on streaming services and limited 12" vinyl on 28 May 2026 and was used in a short film for Chanel directed by Alfonso Cuarón and starring Jacob Elordi.

Album professional ratings
Aggregate scores
Source	Rating
Metacritic	71/100
Review scores
Source	Rating
Mojo	3/5 stars
Pitchfork	6.9/10
musicOMH	3.5/5 stars
Record Collector	4/5 stars
Uncut	4/5 stars

All tracks are written by Thomas Bangalter.

No.	Title	Length
1.	"I. Premiers Mouvements"	5:43
2.	"II. Le Catch"	4:37
3.	"III. Thalestris"	3:20
4.	"IV. Les Gémeaux I"	1:22
5.	"V. Les Amazones"	3:45
6.	"VI. L'Arrivée d'Alexandre"	3:50
7.	"VII. Treize Nuits"	6:18
8.	"VIII. Danae"	4:42
9.	"IX. Zeus"	4:05
10.	"X. L'Accouchement"	5:43
11.	"XI. Les Gorgones"	2:47
12.	"XII. Renaissances"	5:13
13.	"XIII. Le Minotaure"	7:23
14.	"XIV. Eden"	2:33
15.	"XV. Arès"	2:59
16.	"XVI. Aphrodite"	2:21
17.	"XVII. Les Naïades"	1:53
18.	"XVIII. Pas de Deux"	2:49
19.	"XIX. Circonvolutions"	2:18
20.	"XX. Les Gémeaux II"	1:22
21.	"XXI. Icare"	4:22
22.	"XXII. Danse Funèbre"	3:08
23.	"XXIII. La Guerre"	5:58
Total length:		89:02

=== Personnel ===
- Romain Dumas – conductor
- The Orchestre National Bordeaux Aquitaine – orchestra

==== Technical ====
- Thomas Bangalter – composition, orchestration, production
- Florian Lagatta – additional production, mixing, mastering, sound engineering
- Ivan Màrtin – additional production, editing
- Iker Olabe – additional production, mixing, mastering, sound engineering
- Cédric Hervet – art design, layout

=== Charts ===
Chart performance for Mythologies
Chart (2023)	Peak position
Belgian Albums (Ultratop Wallonia)	36
French Albums (SNEP)	27

== Reception ==
Critical reception of Mythologies has varied. Some critics praised the music and choreography of the show, and other critics were more critical of the general concept of the ballet. Lucile Commeaux of Radio France expressed ambivalence, criticizing the ballet, both conceptually and musically, as being without a clear purpose. Philippe Noisette of Les Echos, while calling some of the choreography uninspired, wrote more positively of the ballet, calling it ambitious and praising the compositions of Bangalter while simultaneously warning that fans of Daft Punk may be disappointed. Pétra Wauters writing for the French arts and culture magazine Wukali called Bangalter's compositions "brilliant" and talked of Preljocaj's choice of uncomfortable themes. Marianne Leroux of France Info called the show a spectacle and wrote of Preljocaj's ability to reinvent himself. Jane Bua of Pitchfork, reviewing Bangalter's soundtrack album, spoke positively of his compositions, saying it "sounds like the work of an artist stepping out of his comfort zone in search of personal creative fulfillment." David Mouriquand, reviewing the album for Euronews, said "had this album not had the ‘Former Daft Punk member’ stamp on it, many would be trumpeting it unreservedly as a minor masterpiece," calling the work as a whole "sublime."
