= Damien Jalet =

Belgian choreographer (born 1976)

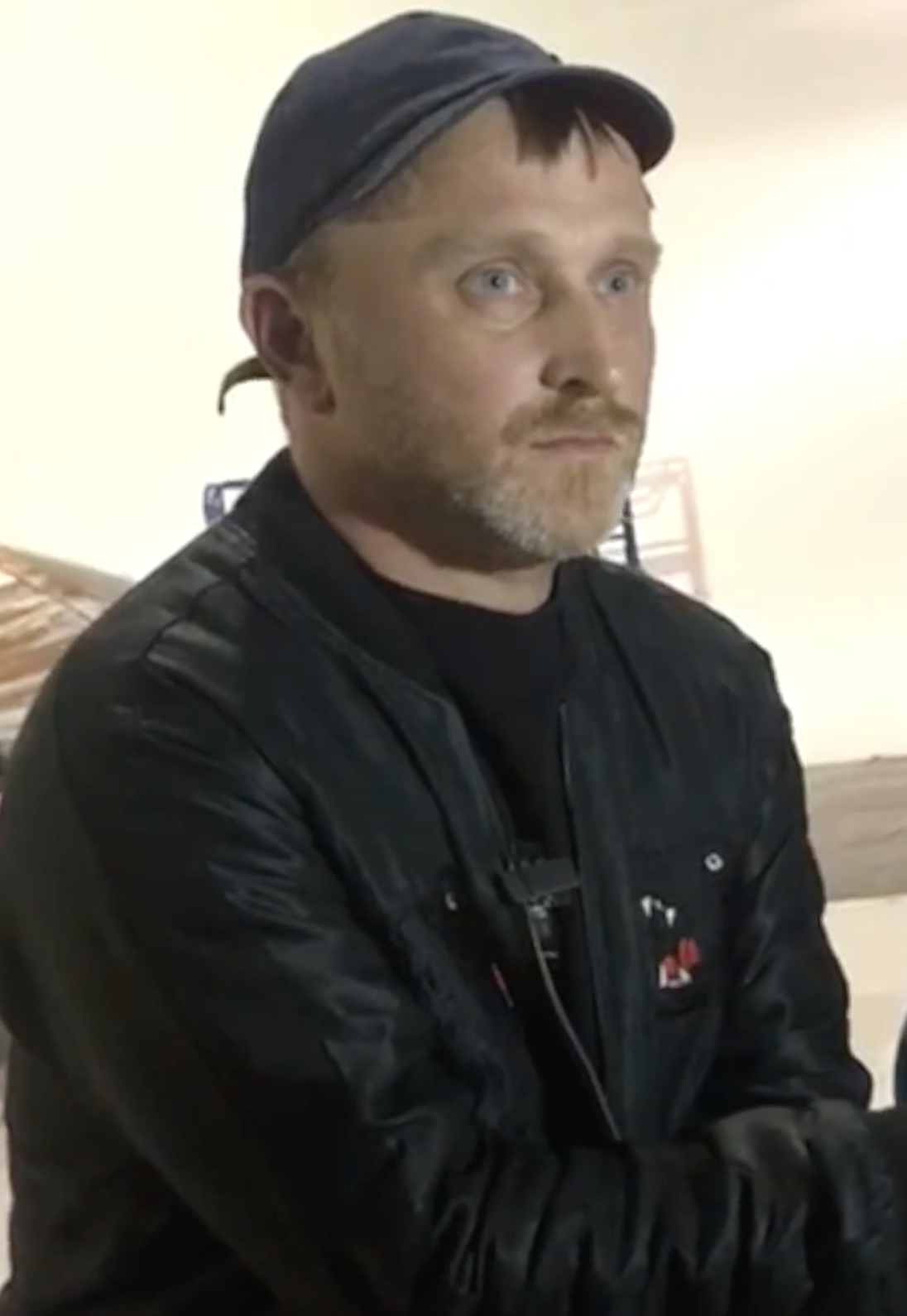
- Jalet in 2018
- Born: 17 August 1976 (age 50); Uccle, Belgium
- Occupations: Dancer, choreographer, ethnomusicologist
- Years active: 2000–present
- Dancing career
- Dances: Contemporary dance

Damien Jalet (born 17 August 1976) is a Belgian-French choreographer, dancer and performer.

== Life and career ==
Damien Jalet was born on 17 August 1976, in Uccle, Belgium. He worked as choreographer and performer for Companies like Ballet C. de la B., Sasha Waltz et Invités, Chunky Move, Eastman, NYDC, Hessiches Staatballet, l’Opéra de Paris, Scottish Dance Theater, and Iceland Dance Company.

Jalet began to study theater at the National Institute of the Performing Art of Brussels, before moving to modern dance and completed his training in New York City.

Since 2000, Jalet has been working as a collaborator of Sidi Larbi Cherkaoui, within Les ballets C. de la B. As a result of this collaboration, he created his own shows, firstly as a dancer, and later also on staging and music.

In May 2013, he created in collaboration with Cherkaoui and performance artist Marina Abramović, a new version of Ravel's Bolero for the Paris Opera Ballet. Costumes were designed by Givenchy's artistic director Riccardo Tisci and the 11 dancer cast included Aurélie Dupont, Marie Agnès Gillot, and Jérémie Bélingard.

Jalet was awarded with the Ordre des Arts et des Lettres by the French government in 2013. In 2014, he signed Yama’s choreography, a play written for the Scottish Dance Theater, with the American stage designer Jim Hodges and the original composition made by the Winter Family group. He also imagined the solo “inked” for the Kathak Aakash Ordera's dancer.

Jalet is laureate of Villa Kujoyama in Kyoto 2015, where he developed Vessel, a six months work collaboration with the visual artist Kohei Nawa, which premiered in September 2016 at the new Rhom Theater Kyoto. The relationship work of Jalet to existing rituals practiced in volcanic islands such as Bali and Japan is at the center of the 70 minutes documentary The Ferryman by Gilles Delmas, narrated by Marina Abramović with the artistic participation of Ryuichi Sakamoto.

Jalet's show Skid (2017) for the Opera's Dance Company of Gothenburg in Sweden, presented 17 performers and dancers on a 10 meters scene sloping at 34 degrees over approximately 40 minutes.

In 2018, Jalet choreographed the American-Italian horror film remake Suspiria. He also choreographed the 2019 short dance film Anima directed by Paul Thomas Anderson. He choreographed for Emilia Pérez.

In April 2026, Jalet choreographed the music video for Storm, a double-single by Gener8ion, featuring and starring Yung Lean and directed by Romain Gavras. He was also the main choreographer for Madonna's musical short film Confessions II, whom he had previously worked with on the Madame X tour.

== Personal life ==
Jalet identifies as gay.

== Main choreographies ==
Creations

- 2002: D’Avant in collaboration with Sidi Larbi Cherkaoui, Juan Kruz diaz de Garaio Esnaola et Luc Dunberry
- 2005: The Unclear Age with Erna Omarsdottir (video dance)
- 2005: Ofætt (Unborn) with Erna Omarsdottir and Gabríela Friðriksdóttir
- 2006: L'Image from Samuel Beckett's play with Arthur Nauzyciel and Anne Brochet
- 2008: Three Spells with Christian Fennesz
- 2009: Transaquania-Out of the Blue in collaboration with Erna Omarsdottir and Gabríela Friðriksdóttir for the Iceland Dance Company
- 2009: Black Marrow in collaboration with Erna Omarsdottir for the Company Chunky Move
- 2010: Transaquania into Thin Air in collaboration with Erna Omarsdottir and Gabríela Friðriksdóttir
- 2013: Les Médusés, choreography in the Louvre Museum in Paris
- 2014: Yama for the Scottish Dance Theatre
- 2015: Gravity Fatigue with Hussein Chalayan at the Sadler's Wells Theatre, London
- 2016: Thr(o)ugh for the Hessiches Staatballet
- 2016: Babel 7.16, a duo with Sidi Larbi Cherkaoui, dans la cour d'honneur du Palais des Papes, Avignon
- 2016: Vessel, in collaboration with Kohei Nawa, at the Theatre Rhom, Kyoto
- 2017: Tarantiseismic for the National Youth Dance Company at the Sadler's Wells, London
- 2017: Skid for the GöteborgsOperans Danskompani, Gothenburg
- 2018: Suspiria, directed by Luca Guadagnino
- 2019: Anima, directed by Paul Thomas Anderson
- 2023: Chiroptera, in collaboration with JR and Thomas Bangalter
- 2024: Mirage, in collaboration with Kohei Nawa; features music from Thomas Bangalter

Collaboration with Sidi Larbi Cherkaoui

- 2010: BABEL (words), a collaboration with Antony Gormley
- 2013: Boléro, a collaboration with Marina Abramović, Opera Garnier, Paris
- 2018: Pelléas et Mélisande, a collaboration with Marina Abramović, Anvers

== Theater and opera ==
- 2006: L'Image from Samuel Beckett's play, staging by Arthur Nauzyciel, Dublin, National Theater of Icelande Reykjavik and Festival "Les Grandes Traversées" in Bordeaux (France) in 2007
- 2006: Il cielo sulla terra
- 2008: Julius Caesar
- 2008: Ordet (The Word), from the text written by Kaj Munk
- 2009: The Sea Museum, from the text written by Marie Darrieussecq
- 2011: Jan Karski (mon nom est une fiction), stagging by Arthur Nauzyciel
- 2014: Splendid's of Jean Genet, staging by Arthur Nauzyciel

== Awards ==
- 2011: Laurence Olivier awards (United Kingdom) with Sidi Larbi Cherkaoui for Babel (words)
- 2011: Benois de la danse (Russia) with Sidi Larbi Cherkaoui for Babel (words)
- 2013: Chevalier dans l'Ordre des Arts et des Lettres by the French Government
- 2014: United Humans Award (with Sidi Larbi Cherkaoui)
- 2015: Grimman awards, Iceland. Choreography of the year for Les medusées
- 2017: Nomination for the Faust Awards (Germany) with Thr(o)ugh
