= Angelin Preljocaj =

French dancer and choreographer

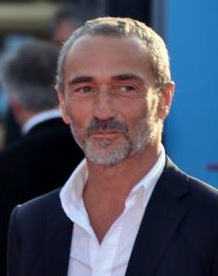
- Born: 19 January 1957 (age 69); Sucy-en-Brie, France
- Occupations: Choreographer, dancer, film director

Angelin Preljocaj (French pronunciation: [pʁɛlʒokaʒ]; Albanian: Preljoçaj /pre.ljo.t͡ʃaj/; born 19 January 1957) is a French dancer and choreographer of contemporary dance.

== Early life ==
Angelin Preljocaj was born in 1957 in Sucy-en-Brie, France. He is of Albanian descent. His father was born in Vermosh, but was escaped from Albania because of communism, while his mother was from Ulcinj. They went to France together, where Angelin was born.

== Career ==
His choreographic work is steeped in his writing of the history of classical ballet, but is resolutely contemporary. He joined the repertoire of the Ballet de l'Opéra national de Paris in the early 1990s. In 1995, he received the Prix Benois de la Danse as choreographer.

In December 1984 he founded the ballet company that in 1996 that was subsequently renamed Ballet Preljocaj when it moved into its current home of residence at Pavillon Noir of Aix-en-Provence.

== Main choreographies ==
- 1984: Aventures coloniales
- 1984: Marché noir
- 1985: Larmes blanches
- 1985: Peurs bleues
- 1986: À nos héros
- 1987: Le Petit Napperon bouge
- 1987: Hallali Romée
- 1988: Liqueurs de chair
- 1988: Les raboteurs after painting by Caillebotte
- 1989: Noces (répertoire)
- 1989: Un trait d'union
- 1990: Amer America
- 1990: Romeo and Juliet
- 1992: La Peau du Monde
- 1993: Parade (répertoire)
- 1993: Noces (new version)
- 1993: Le Spectre de la Rose (répertoire)
- 1994: Le Parc (répertoire) for the Ballet de l'Opéra national de Paris
- 1995: Annonciation (Bessie Award in 1997)
- 1995: Petit Essai sur le temps qui passe
- 1995: L'Anoure (répertoire)
- 1996: The Firebird (répertoire)
- 1996: Romeo and Juliet (new version) in collaboration with Enki Bilal
- 1996: L'Annonciation (répertoire)
- 1997: La Stravaganza
- 1997: Paysages après la bataille
- 1998: Centaures
- 1998: Casanova (répertoire)
- 1999: Personne n'épouse les méduses
- 2000: Portraits in Corpore
- 2000: MC/14-22 (Ceci est mon corps)
- 2001: The Rite of Spring
- 2001: Helikopter on a composition by Karlheinz Stockhausen
- 2002: Near Life Experience
- 2003: L'Annonciation (video version)
- 2004: MC/14-22 (new version, répertoire)
- 2004: Le Songe de Médée (répertoire)
- 2004: Empty Moves (part I) on a music by John Cage
- 2004: N (répertoire) with Kurt Hentschläger (Image, light & stage design) and Ulf Langheinrich (music and sound design)
- 2005: Les 4 saisons... in collaboration with Fabrice Hyber (répertoire)
- 2007: Empty Moves (Part I and II) (répertoire)
- 2007: Eldorado (Sonntags Abschied) (répertoire) with a dedicated composition for the ballet by Karlheinz Stockhausen
- 2008: Blanche Neige (Snow White)
- 2009: Le funambule
- 2010: Siddharta
- 2010: And then A Thousand Years Of Peace
- 2011: suivront mille ans de calme
- 2012: What I Call Oblivion
- 2013: The Nights
- 2015: Return to Berratham
- 2016: The Painting on The Wall
- 2017: Still Life
- 2018: Gravity
- 2019: Winterreise
- 2020: Swan Lake
- 2021: Deleuze / Hendrix
- 2022: Mythologies

== Filmography ==
- 2016: Polina
