= Remotion: The Global Communication Remix Album =

Remotion

Remix album by Global Communication
- Released: 1995
- Recorded: Evolution Studios, Crewkerne, United Kingdom
- Genre: Ambient
- Length: 61:08
- Label: Dedicated Records
- Producer: Mark Pritchard, Tom Middleton

Global Communication chronology
76:14 (1994)	Remotion (1995)

Professional ratings
Review scores
Source	Rating
AllMusic	3/5 stars

Remotion is the second remix album by ambient music duo Global Communication. Originally released on Dedicated Records, the album has been re-issued a number of times.

The album features a number of remixes that Global Communication had done for other artists. It also includes one track (not a remix) from their more techno-leaning side project, Reload.

== Track listing ==
1. Jon Anderson "Amor Real" – 8:59
2. Chapterhouse "Delta Phase" – 9:52
3. Warp 69 "Natural High" – 9:04
4. Reload "Le Soleil et la Mer" – 8:09
5. The Grid "Rollercoaster" – 8:18
6. Chapterhouse "Epsilon Phase" – 11:21
7. Nav Katze "Wild Horses" – 15:12

== Notes ==
The Chapterhouse remixes appeared on Global Communication's earlier release Pentamerous Metamorphosis. "Delta phase", as it appears on this release, is approximately 49 seconds shorter than on its original '93 release, and 22 seconds shorter than on the '98 remaster/reissue.

The Reload track is not a remix, but the same version as it originally appeared on the Reload album A Collection of Short Stories.

All other remixes can also be found on releases by their original artists.
