= Fabric 26 =

Compilation album by Global Communication
- Released: February 21, 2006
- Genre: Electronic music
- Length: 73:20
- Label: Fabric
- Producer: Global Communication

Fabric Mix Series chronology
Fabric 25 (2005)	Fabric 26 (2006)	Fabric 27 (2006)

Professional ratings
Review scores
Source	Rating
365mag	8/10 stars
AllMusic	3/5 stars
Pitchfork	7.6 stars on a 10 point scale

Fabric 26 is a DJ mix compilation album by Global Communication, as part of the Fabric Mix Series.

== Track listing ==
1. The Return Of The Returner - Intro - Mark Pritchard
2. Dabrye - No Child Of God (Instrumental) - Eastern Developments Music
3. Waajeed - Starz - Bling 47 Recordings
4. Tableek - Serene Vision - Four Brothers INK / Bukarance Records
5. Steve Spacek - I'm Glad - Sound In Color
6. Harmonic 313 - Arc Light - Harmonic 313
7. Maspyke - Lightly Anxious - ABB / Bukarance Records
8. Danny Breaks - The Octopus (Intergalactic Starighter) - The Alphabet Zoo Record Company
9. MED Ft. Dudley Perkins - Now U Know - Stones Throw Records
10. Trickski - Sunshine Fu*k Part 1 - Sonar Kollektiv
11. Genre - Too - NEPA Recordings
12. Jeremy Ellis - 86 (Verbs) - Ubiquity Recordings
13. Kirk Degiorgio Presents As One - Rumours - Versatile Records
14. Motorcitysoul - Aura - Infracom
15. Solid Groove - Flookin' - Loungin' Recordings
16. Audiomontage - Vision 2 Vision - Freerange Records
17. Vince Watson - The Way It's Meant To Be - Delsin Records
18. Shur-I-Kan - Living Inside - Freerange Records
19. Soul Mekanik - Robots - Rip Records
20. Artec - Sweet Music - Lucid Recordings
21. Balil - Flux - Warp Records
22. Tom Middleton Presents AMBA - Margherita - Tomidi Productions
