= Custom Blue =

- Origin: London, United Kingdom
- Genres: Electronic, acoustic, alternative rock, folk, trip hop
- Years active: 1995–present
- Labels: Island Blue; Far Out Recordings; Ho Hum Records
- Website: Official website

Custom Blue is a British band who have recorded and produced for Island Records, V2, Far Out Recordings and !K7 Records prior to releasing with Ho Hum Records in London.

== Career ==
Originating from South London, Alex Pilkington and Simon Shippey met at Alleyn's School in Dulwich, and started the band in 1995 with originally Crispin Weir on guitar and Max Tundra on bass, along with a succession of drummers. Following non-stop gigging in London throughout the 1990s the band started to attract both managers and record labels keen to sign them.

In 2000 Custom Blue released "Hazel's Groove" / "Sitting by my Stream", followed by "EPOne".

In 2002, Custom Blue issued their debut album, All Follow Everyone on DJ Ross Allen's Island Blue imprint on Universal Records. Their single "So Low" featured remixes from Mark Pritchard and the Cinematic Orchestra and appeared on the film, The Transporter. All Follow Everyone was produced by Custom Blue with help from Spacek and Mark Pritchard.

Following their departure from Universal Records in 2003, Custom Blue produced an album for the American artist, Beth Hirsch, forming the production and studio name Bluesound for the project. In 2003 Custom Blue also released an album of electronica under the alias Hoighty Beaver on Blank Page Records.

In 2007 Custom Blue released a single on Far Out Recordings entitled "Under the Counter" / "You're on Your Own", followed by "When It Burns" / "Without You" on Ho Hum Records in 2008. In 2009, "Cobblestones" plus their album All Will Be Well, appeared on Ho Hum Records.

== Discography ==
=== Singles and EPs ===
- "Hazel's Groove" / "Sitting by My Stream" (2000)
- "EPOne" (2002)
- "So Low" (2002)
- "Under the Counter" / "You're on Your Own" (2006)
- "When It Burns" / "Without You" (2008)
- "Cobblestones" (2009)
- "EP3 'The Tree'" (2011)

=== Albums ===
- All Follow Everyone (2002)
- All Will Be Well (2009)
