= Tall Tales (Mark Pritchard and Thom Yorke album) =

2025 studio album

Studio album by Mark Pritchard and Thom Yorke
- Released: 9 May 2025
- Recorded: 2020
- Studios: Vintage Keys, Wizard of Oz
- Genres: Electronic; experimental; ambient
- Length: 61:49
- Label: Warp
- Producer: Mark Pritchard

Thom Yorke studio albums chronology
Confidenza (2024)	Tall Tales (2025)

Mark Pritchard studio albums chronology
The Four Worlds (2018)	Tall Tales (2025)

Singles from Tall Tales
- 1. "Back in the Game" Released: 13 February 2025; 2. "This Conversation Is Missing Your Voice" Released: 11 March 2025; 3. "Gangsters" Released: 9 April 2025; 4. "The Spirit" Released: 8 May 2025

Tall Tales is a studio album by the English musicians Mark Pritchard and Thom Yorke, released on 9 May 2025 through Warp Records. It comprises electronic, experimental and ambient music. Yorke and Pritchard began work in 2020 during the COVID-19 pandemic, exchanging work online.

The cover artwork was created by Jonathan Zawada using CGI and AI. Zawada also produced a feature length-film accompanying the album, which was screened in some cinemas.

Tall Tales was promoted with the singles "Back in the Game", "This Conversation Is Missing Your Voice", "Gangsters" and "The Spirit", promoted with videos taken from the Tall Tales film and a global scavenger hunt. It received positive reviews, with critics praising its experimental sound and themes of existential dread.

== Background ==
In 2011, Pritchard created two remixes of "Bloom" for the remix album TKOL RMX 1234567 by Yorke's band Radiohead. In 2012, when Radiohead played in Sydney, Pritchard was introduced to the band by their touring drummer, Clive Deamer. After Pritchard invited Yorke to collaborate, Yorke sang on "Beautiful People", a single from Pritchard's 2016 album Under the Sun. In 2019, Pritchard remixed "Not the News" from Yorke's album Anima.

== Recording ==
In 2020, during the COVID-19 pandemic, Yorke emailed Pritchard asking him to send him music to work on at home. Pritchard sent around 20 demos, and Yorke began to write lyrics. Later, Yorke began sending demos with his vocals back to Pritchard. Pritchard started some of the tracks in 2015 and 2016.

Pritchard and Yorke continued to send work back and forth, editing songs down and modifying them. Pritchard said he enjoyed working with Yorke, as he also played synthesisers, edited tracks and added effects. Pritchard and Yorke never met during the production, instead communicating through email and Zoom. Yorke said Tall Tales was important to him and described its creation as "mental".

Pritchard wanted to use guitars for some songs, but Yorke declined. Pritchard searched for obscure synthesisers, swapping with friends and using Melbourne Electronic Sound Studio. He used synthesisers including the Korg PS-3300, the Yamaha DX1, a Philips PMC 100, a Roland CR-78, and a Mattel Bee Gees toy rhythm machine. He used Vintage Keys, a recording studio in Hampshire, to source 1950s and 60s valve synthesisers. He used preset drum patterns, enjoying "being stuck with a pattern that is sometimes borderline cheesy".

== Music and lyrics ==
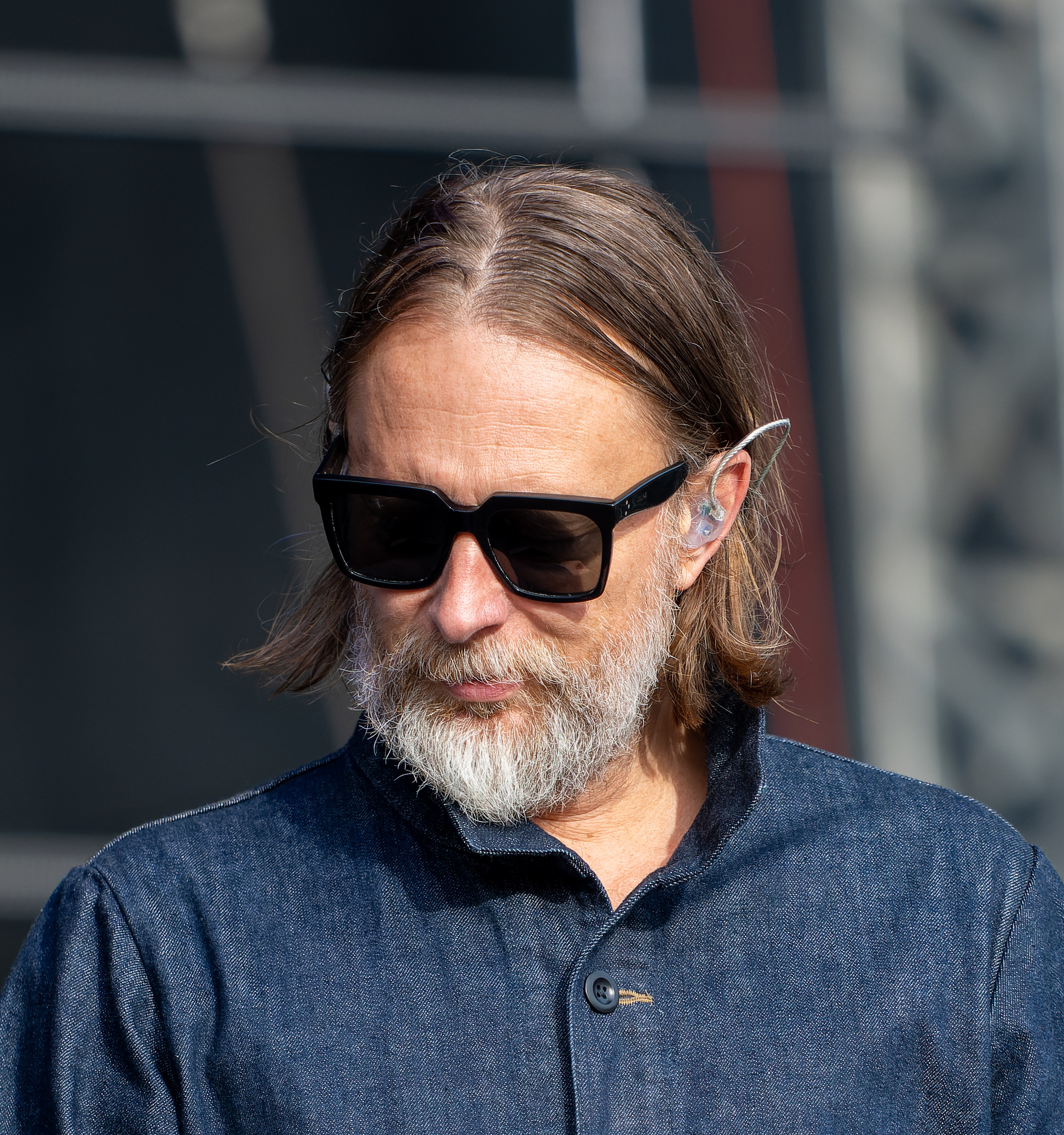
Yorke processed and manipulated his vocals.

Tall Tales comprises electronic, experimental and ambient music. Compared to Anima, the lyrics of Tall Tales are darker and dystopian, with themes including "human greed, mendacity, disconnection and the climate crisis". While Pritchard was reluctant to call it a "lockdown record", he conceded themes from 2020 were present. The album title was inspired by George Orwell's novel Nineteen Eighty-Four.

Yorke experimented with his voice, using it as a "versatile musical instrument". He would manipulate his vocals and process them with different effects. Yorke said he liked "mangling" his voice to bring out "different identities" for the lyrics, using effects such as pitch-shifting and transposition. On "Gangsters", Yorke alternated between low and high pitches to give the illusion of multiple singers. On "Wandering Genie", he layered his voice and modulated it. Rolling Stone called his vocals "hauntingly opaque and ensnaringly eerie".

Several critics noted the experimental nature. The Independent called it a "strange alien synthscape", while Clash called it "sometimes otherworldly, frequently tongue-in-cheek, and occasionally surprisingly punchy". Andy Kellman of AllMusic said it took influences from Kraftwerk, Cluster, Martin Hannett, Chris & Cosey and Andy Stott. Kellman also said Tall Tales was made up of "eerie drones, misshapen voices, and other atmospheric elements abound".

"A Fake in a Faker's World" contains a rhythmic synthesiser beat and processed vocals. Yorke added modular synthesisers. "Ice Shelf" is a dark, ambient song. "Bugging Out Again" has a haunting falsetto over a slow keyboard soundscape. "Back in the Game" is an "electro-goth" song with "mature and declamatory" vocals. "The White Cliffs" is a minimalist and "wintry" song with a basic drum machine pattern; one critic likened it to Air's Moon Safari. "The Spirit" uses strings and trombone and was likened to Coldplay.

"Gangsters" is a new wave song with electronic rhythms and synthesisers. "This Conversation is Missing Your Voice" is a more coherent R&B track with syncopated handclaps and a stuttering vocal effect. "Tall Tales" is a darker song with layered vocoder-processed spoken words. "Happy Days" has a repetitive marching rhythm and "lightly bouncing vocals". "The Men Who Dance in Stag's Heads" is a "medieval folk ballad" that uses muted drums, tambourine and the harmonium. "Wandering Genie" is a dark ambient track with the repeated line "I am falling".

== Artwork and film ==
"In the wrong hands, this could've wound up as quite garish. And what it does for my music is quite unusual. For the sound, the melodies, I tried to balance the heavy against the light on the album with its sequencing, and the difference in Thom's vocals, but Jonathan's take on all that—his layers—takes it to yet another place, which is why I wanted him to work on this."

— Mark Pritchard, 2025

The artwork for Tall Tales was created by Jonathan Zawada, who was described as a "third member of the group" in a press release. Zawada first corresponded with Pritchard in 2006 over email, but they did not meet in person until 2010. They collaborated on several projects before Tall Tales. Zawada first spoke to Yorke in 2020 over Zoom.

Zawada began working on the artwork after Pritchard sent him instrumentals, and was given creative freedom. Zawada and Pritchard talked frequently while the album was produced. The two considered releasing the album as black squares, gradually revealing the artwork to allow the audience to "form their own relationship with the music before introducing any visual context". Zawada was directly influenced by 1960s and 70s British children's television. He used artificial intelligence during the design process, but licensed content before using it. Rather than using prompts, he programmed the desired results and used locally downloaded models. Pritchard noted the contrast between the CGI and the imperfect AI artwork. The video for "A Fake in a Faker's World" was among the first completed.

The music videos were taken from a feature-length film accompanying the album. It saw one-night cinema screenings across the world on 8 May. Zawada wanted the film to support the music while not "taking over it too much or being entirely secondary to it". He said none of the videos were generated by AI, and only used it for assistance with backgrounds and textures. Zawada said he saw himself as "worldbuilder" rather than a filmmaker. A limited amount of Tall Tales zines designed by Zawada were given to attendees.

== Release ==
Yorke debuted "Back in the Game" during his 2024 Everything tour. He and Pritchard posted a clip of the song on Instagram on 7 February 2025. It was released as the first single on 13 February, alongside a music video from Zawada. On 11 March, Tall Tales was announced alongside the release of the second single, "This Conversation Is Missing Your Voice". On 26 March, venues and details about the film were shared. "Gangsters" was released on 9 April, followed by "The Spirit" on 8 May. The film was shown on 8 May.

Tall Tales was released on 9 May 2025, and was Yorke's first release through Warp Records. On 16 May, Yorke and Pritchard announced a global scavenger hunt, with 400 Tall Tales coins to be found. Found coins are listed at the website The Forger's Ledger, with photos, locations and the names of the finders. Some coins were found in deluxe vinyl editions of Tall Tales. Pritchard posted a video of the coins being produced.

== Reception ==
Professional ratings
Aggregate scores
Source	Rating
AnyDecentMusic?	7.7/10
Metacritic	81/100
Review scores
Source	Rating
AllMusic	4/5 stars
Clash	8/10
The Independent	4/5 stars
The Line of Best Fit	9/10
Mojo	4/5 stars
MusicOMH	4/5 stars
Pitchfork	7.6/10
Rolling Stone	3.5/5 stars
Record Collector	4/5 stars
Uncut	8/10

At Metacritic, which aggregates scores from mainstream critics, Tall Tales has an average score of 81 based on 11 reviews, indicating "critical acclaim". AllMusic writer Andy Kellman called the album a "coherent, if often cryptic joint effort". Writing for Clash, Phil Taylor said the mix of Pritchard's production and Yorke's voice would trigger anxieties in listeners they "hadn't known about". Will Russel of Hot Press called Tall Tales a "marvellous album altogether". Helen Brown of The Independent called it a "filmic sequence of 12 songs" made up of "existential jitters".

Mojo's Victoria Segal noted the lack of hope and focus on "nameless dread". Writing for Pitchfork, Jazz Monroe said that while Tall Tales was not attention-grabbing, its experimental sound and "risky maneuvers" made up for it. Christopher Hamilton-Peach of The Line of Best Fit called Tall Tales a "menacing, evocative and hypnotically immersive" statement on society. He also said Zawada's visuals lent a "decidedly disturbing lens". Writing for Rolling Stone, Jon Dolan called Tall Tales a "detour that leads to new epiphanies". Rich Juzwiak of Resident Advisor called it a "minor work" for Pritchard and Yorke, but said its lasting impact was yet to be seen.

== Track listing ==
All lyrics are written by Thom Yorke; all music is composed by Mark Pritchard and Yorke.

Tall Tales track listing
No.	Title	Length
1.	"A Fake in a Faker's World"	8:18
2.	"Ice Shelf"	4:47
3.	"Bugging Out Again"	4:44
4.	"Back in the Game"	4:41
5.	"The White Cliffs"	8:19
6.	"The Spirit"	4:55
7.	"Gangsters"	3:29
8.	"This Conversation Is Missing Your Voice"	3:54
9.	"Tall Tales"	5:10
10.	"Happy Days"	4:20
11.	"The Men Who Dance in Stag's Heads"	3:41
12.	"Wandering Genie"	5:31
Total length:		61:49

== Personnel ==
Credits adapted from the liner notes.

- Thom Yorke – vocals, modular (tracks 1, 2, 5, 7–9), piano, EHX voice box (tracks 7, 10)
- Mark Pritchard – production, mixing, synthesiser, Omnichord (track 5), drums (track 6, 7, 10, 11)
- Jonathan Zawada – design
- Jason Mitchell – mastering
- Steve Christie – recording, vocal processing, harmonium (track 11), drums (track 4–6)
- Josh Wermut – recording, bass (track 6, 11)
- Louisa Revolta – vocals (track 8), clarinet (track 10)
- Bibio – recording, engineering (track 10)
- Heather Grant – cor anglais (track 10)
- Lucy Andrews – oboe (track 11)

== Charts ==
Chart performance for Tall Tales
Chart (2025)	Peak position
Australian Albums (ARIA)	65
Austrian Albums (Ö3 Austria)	53
Belgian Albums (Ultratop Flanders)	42
Belgian Albums (Ultratop Wallonia)	61
Dutch Albums (Album Top 100)	66
German Albums (Offizielle Top 100)	17
Japanese Albums (Oricon)	38
Scottish Albums (Official Charts)	8
Swiss Albums (Schweizer Hitparade)	49
UK Albums (Official Charts)	43
UK Dance Albums (Official Charts)	1
UK Independent Albums (Official Charts)	3
