= Everything (tour) =

2024 concert tour by Thom Yorke

- Solo tour by Thom Yorke
- Promotional poster
- Location: Australia; Japan; New Zealand; Singapore
- Start date: October 23, 2024
- End date: November 26, 2024
- Legs: 1
- No. of shows: 18

Everything was a 2024 solo concert tour by the English musician Thom Yorke. It comprised 18 shows in Australia, Japan, New Zealand and Singapore between 23 October and 26 November.

Yorke played a variety of songs from his solo projects and his bands Radiohead, Atoms for Peace and the Smile. A show in Melbourne was interrupted by a pro-Palestine protester. A concert film, Thom Yorke Live at Sydney Opera House, premiered in January 2026 and was released on YouTube in March.

== Shows ==
Yorke announced the tour on 2 June 2024. He said he would be "alone on stage trying a new kind of solo show thing playing versions of songs from my recent and not so recent past". Yorke said the tour was named "Everything" as to not put limits on songs he could play. The tour began on 25 October 2024 in Auckland, New Zealand.

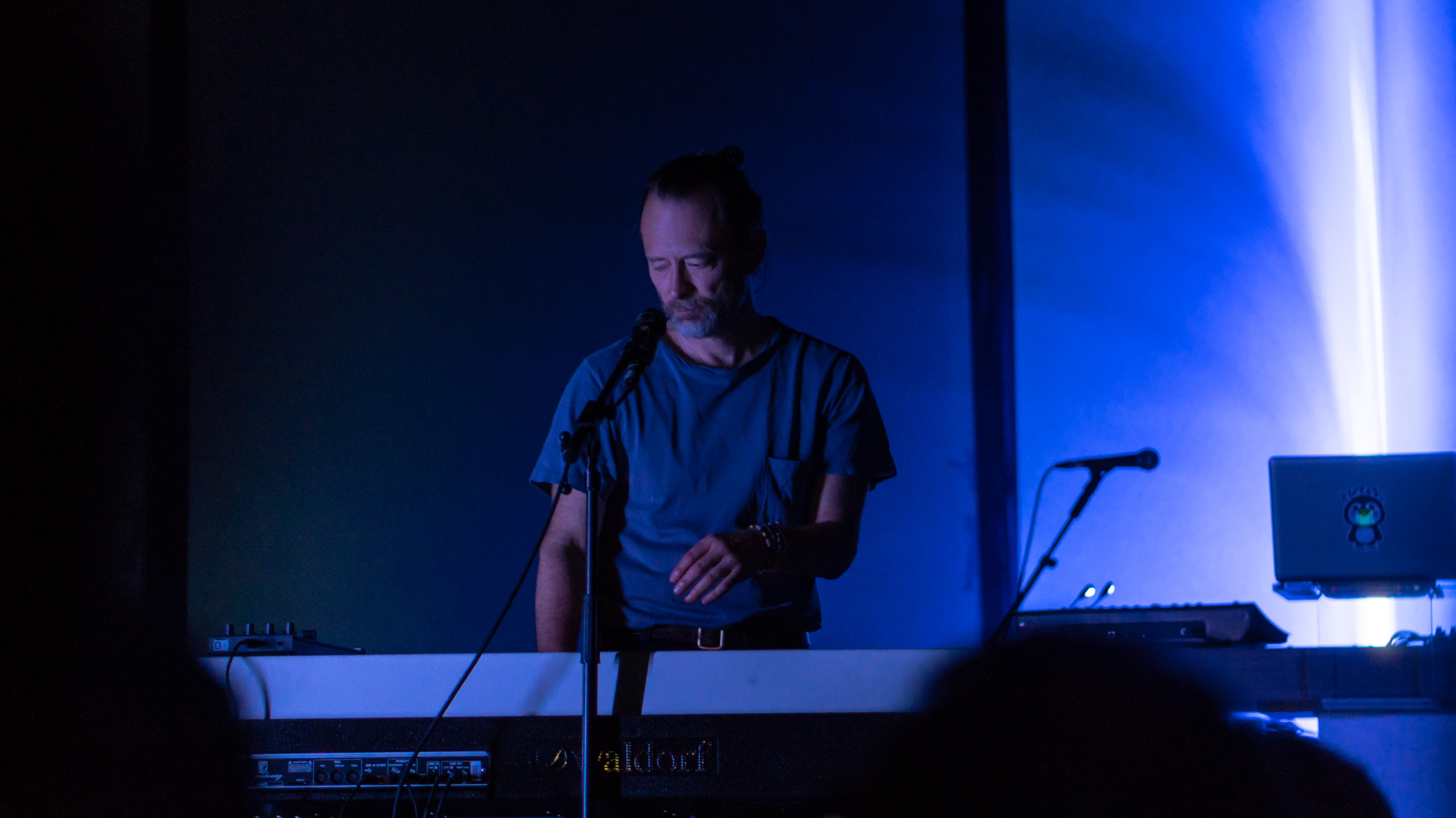
Yorke performing in 2018

Yorke performed "stripped-back" arrangements of songs from his solo records and his bands Radiohead, Atoms for Peace and the Smile. He also debuted the song "Back in the Game", created with the English electronic musician Mark Pritchard for the album Tall Tales, released the following year. Yorke used a variety of synthesisers, guitars, mixers and microphones, moving between them as he played.

Two pop-up shops in Melbourne and Sydney opened in promotion of the tour, selling merchandise including vinyl records, shirts and posters. Merchandise from Radiohead and the Smile was also sold, as well as a limited-edition record, Live From Electric Lady Studios.

== Pro-Palestine protest ==
On 30 October, during Yorke's last performance in Melbourne, a pro-Palestine protester interrupted the show close to its conclusion. Yorke asked the protester to come up on stage, calling him a coward and asking if he wanted to "piss on everybody's night". Yorke then walked off stage. He returned to perform the final song, "Karma Police". Yorke wrote later that it "didn't really seem like the best moment to discuss the unfolding humanitarian catastrophe in Gaza". Yorke and Radiohead had previously been criticised for playing in Tel Aviv in 2017, in defiance of a boycott arranged by the Boycott, Divestment and Sanctions movement. Yorke called the criticism "patronising" and "offensive".

== Reception ==
Tammy Walters of Forte said the tour highlighted Yorke's flexibility in vocals and instrumentation. Writing for Rolling Stone Australia, James Jennings gave a performance at the Sydney Opera House two and a half out of five, praising Yorke's vocals but writing that the "patchy selection of songs doesn't quite gel into a cohesive, satisfying whole".

== Concert film ==
A concert film, Thom Yorke Live at Sydney Opera House, premiered on 20 January 2026 in Sydney, with a theatrical release across Australia on 6 March. It was released on the ABC News YouTube channel on 7 April.

== Setlist ==
This setlist is derived from Yorke's first performance in Christchurch, New Zealand. It is not representative of all shows.

Song	Artist	Album
'Weird Fishes / Arpeggi"	Radiohead	In Rainbows (2007)
"I Might Be Wrong"	Radiohead	Amnesiac (2001)
"A Brain in a Bottle"	Thom Yorke	Tomorrow's Modern Boxes (2014)
"Packt Like Sardines in a Crushd Tin Box"	Radiohead	Amnesiac (2001)
"Suspirium"	Thom Yorke	Suspiria (2018)
"Bloom"	Radiohead	The King of Limbs (2011)
"Nose Grows Some"	Thom Yorke	Tomorrow's Modern Boxes (2014)
"How to Disappear Completely"	Radiohead	Kid A (2000)
"Black Swan"	Thom Yorke	The Eraser (2006)
"Back in the Game"	Mark Pritchard and Thom Yorke	Tall Tales (2025)
"Rabbit in Your Headlights"	Unkle and Thom Yorke	Psyence Fiction (1998)
"Volk"	Thom Yorke	Suspiria (2018)
"Daydreaming"	Radiohead	A Moon Shaped Pool (2016)
"Not the News"	Thom Yorke	Anima (2019)
"Present Tense"	Radiohead	A Moon Shaped Pool (2016)
"Everything in Its Right Place"	Radiohead	Kid A (2000)
"Dawn Chorus"	Thom Yorke	Anima (2019)
"Hearing Damage"	Thom Yorke	The Twilight Saga: New Moon (2009)
"Default"	Atoms for Peace	Amok (2013)
"Bodysnatchers"	Radiohead	In Rainbows (2007)

=== Encore ===
Title	Artist	Album
"Bodies Laughing"	The Smile	Cutouts (2024)
"Cymbal Rush"	Thom Yorke	The Eraser (2006)
"Atoms for Peace"	Thom Yorke	The Eraser (2006)

=== Second encore ===
Title	Artist	Album
"Karma Police"	Radiohead	OK Computer (1997)

== Tour dates ==
Date	City	Country	Venue
23 October 2024	Christchurch	New Zealand	Wolfbrook Arena
25 October 2024	Auckland	New Zealand	Spark Arena
26 October 2024	Auckland	New Zealand	Spark Arena
29 October 2024	Melbourne	Australia	Sidney Myer Music Bowl
30 October 2024	Melbourne	Australia	Sidney Myer Music Bowl
1 November 2024	Sydney	Australia	Sydney Opera House Forecourt
2 November 2024	Sydney	Australia	Sydney Opera House Forecourt
5 November 2024	Singapore		The Star Theatre
12 November 2024	Osaka	Japan	Grand Cube
13 November 2024	Osaka	Japan	Grand Cube
15 November 2024	Tachikawa	Japan	Tachikawa Stage Garden
16 November 2024	Tokyo	Japan	Line Cube Shibuya
18 November 2024	Fukuoka	Japan	Sunplace
19 November 2024	Hiroshima	Japan	Hiroshima Bunka Gakuen HBG Hall
21 November 2024	Nagoya	Japan	Century Hall
23 November 2024	Tokyo	Japan	Tokyo Garden Theatre
24 November 2024	Tokyo	Japan	Tokyo Garden Theatre
26 November 2024	Kyoto	Japan	ROHM Theatre
