= Red Bull Music Academy =

Series of music workshops and festivals since 1998

The Red Bull Music Academy (RBMA) is a world-traveling series of music workshops and festivals that was founded in 1998 by Red Bull GmbH. The main five-week event is held in a different city each year. The public portion of its program is a festival of concerts, art installations, club nights and lectures by influential figures in contemporary music. The other part of the program is by invitation only and is held in a building that has been custom-fitted with a large recording studio, a lecture hall, a radio booth and 8–12 bedroom-sized studios. There, 60 up-and-coming producers, singers, sound artists, DJs and musicians from around the world learn from and collaborate with top industry professionals.

The Red Bull Music Academy maintains an online magazine and lecture video archive year-round. The Academy hosts additional music workshops and club nights and curates stages at festivals in around 60 countries worldwide. In 2019, it was announced that both the Red Bull Music Academy and Red Bull Radio would be closing on October 31 of that year after Red Bull parted ways with consultancy company Yadastar, which managed both organizations.

== History ==
The Academy was initiated in 1998 in Berlin and has taken place annually in subsequent years in Toronto, London, São Paulo, Seattle, Cape Town, Rome, London, Melbourne, New York, Madrid, Barcelona, Tokyo, Paris, Montréal and Dublin. While the first few editions saw a greater emphasis on DJ culture, the program and recording facilities now accommodate all genres and aspects of the musical spectrum.

Prospective applicants to the Academy must prepare a demo CD of their work, be it original productions, songs or a DJ set, along with a completed questionnaire, and mail it to a Red Bull Music Academy office in Cologne, Germany. From there, each application is taken into consideration, with no quota on country or musical genre. From these applications, 60 are selected and broken down into two groups of 30. Each group of 30 is flown in to the location of the respective year's event for one of two fortnightly "terms". In 2012, the Academy received over 4,000 applications to take part in the 2013 edition in New York City.

For two weeks, the participants have the opportunity work in up to 12 studios specially designed for every edition of the Red Bull Music Academy. There, they have access to a range of the latest gear as well as analog equipment for music production and performance. There are no deadlines or set quotas, and Red Bull does not own the music produced in the building. These collaborative sessions are in part facilitated by the Academy’s "Studio Team", who are all experienced music producers in various fields. Twice daily, participants attend lectures by guest speakers who range from composers, producers, sound engineers and technological pioneers, to rappers and industry professionals. Lecture attendance is the only compulsory part of the program.

The Red Bull Music Academy does not seek to select or create "stars", instead bringing together music makers with a wide range of talents, skill levels and cultural backgrounds. Notable former participants include Aloe Blacc, Branko of Buraka Som Sistema, Bahrainian oud player Hasan Hujairi, Juan Son, Natalia Lafourcade, Nina Kraviz, Sevdaliza, Hudson Mohawke, David Eriksson of Teenage Engineering, Blackcoffee, Tokimonsta, Flying Lotus, Evian Christ, Teri Gender Bender, Salva and Andreya Triana.

The Academy also publishes an annual double-CD compilation of music produced at the respective last edition titled "Various Assets – Not for Sale". Since 2004, those compilations have featured original music from more than 300 artists, including Dorian Concept, Flying Lotus, Lusine, Theo Parrish, Aloe Blacc, Mark Pritchard, XXXchange, Om’Mas Keith of Sa-Ra, Illuminated faces, Tony Allen, Mr Hudson, Dennis Coffey, Hudson Mohawke, DJ Zinc, Wally Badarou, Benga, Phonte, Jake One, Steve Spacek of Spacek and Natalia Lafourcade.

The Red Bull Music Academy hosts additional workshops and three-day Base Camp sessions in more than 60 countries every year. These events resemble the actual Academy in consisting of music lectures, hands-on production workshops, studio sessions, art exhibitions and nighttime activities such as concerts and club events. There is a strong focus on local topics as well as an international perspective.

== Further activities ==
The Red Bull Music Academy has partnered with some of the most prominent music festivals, such as Sónar, Mutek, Movement: Detroit's Electronic Music Festival, Melt!, Notting Hill Carnival, Oxegen, Meltdown, Monegros Desert Festival, Splendour In The Grass Bestival and the Winter Music Conference. The Academy curates stages at these festivals and/or hosts workshops or one-off concerts in tandem with the festivals.

In 2005, the Red Bull Music Academy launched the Internet radio station Red Bull Radio, which broadcast interviews, live recordings and DJ mixes from more than 50 countries, via a 24/7 live stream and on-demand. The station enjoyed an average of 600,000 listeners online per month and was syndicated to terrestrial radio stations in over 30 countries. RBMA Radio’s mobile app for iOS, Android, WindowsPhone and Symbian had been downloaded more than 500,000 times. As of 2019, it is no longer in service, in favor of streaming service Mixcloud.

As a function of Red Bull Music Academy's efforts to create awareness for the Academy and promote its artists, Academy alumni also have further support, bookings and promotion through Red Bull Music Academy channels after the sessions are over. Many tours, local events and major festival bookings are pulled from the roster of past Red Bull Music Academy participants.

== Host cities ==
| Year | No. | Host city |
|---|---|---|
| 1998 | 1 | Berlin, Germany |
| 1999 | 2 | Berlin, Germany |
| 2000 | 3 | (Republic of Ireland) Dublin, Ireland |
| 2001 | 4 | (United Kingdom) London, UK/ New York City, United States |
| 2002 | 5 | São Paulo, Brazil |
| 2003 | 6 | Cape Town, South Africa |
| 2004 | 7 | Rome, Italy |
| 2005 | 8 | Seattle, United States |
| 2006 | 9 | Melbourne, Australia |
| 2007 | 10 | Toronto, Canada |
| 2008 | 11 | Barcelona, Spain |
| 2009 | | Cologne, Germany |
| 2010 | 12 | (United Kingdom) London, UK |
| 2011 | 13 | Madrid, Spain |
| 2013 | 14 | New York City, United States |
| 2014 | 15 | Tokyo, Japan |
| 2015 | 16 | Paris, France |
| 2016 | 17 | Montreal, Canada |
| 2018 | 18 (20th Anniversary Edition) | Berlin, Germany |

== Corporate structure ==
The Red Bull Music Academy was co-founded by Many Ameri, Christopher Romberg and Torsten Schmidt, of the consultancy company Yadastar (Christopher Romberg left the company in 2011). In 1997, beverage manufacturer Red Bull approached Yadastar about implementing some method of fostering discourse about underground dance culture.
