= A Collection of Short Stories =

A Collection of Short Stories may refer to Short story collections more generally or specifically to:

- A Collection of Short Stories (Houston Calls album)
- A Collection of Short Stories (Reload album)
