= 76:14 =

Studio album by Global Communication
- Released: 1 June 1994
- Recorded: 1991–1994
- Studio: Evolution (Crewkerne)
- Genre: Ambient; electronica; chillout; ambient house; downtempo
- Length: 76:12
- Label: Dedicated
- Producer: Tom Middleton; Mark Pritchard

Global Communication chronology
Pentamerous Metamorphosis (1993)	76:14 (1994)	Remotion: The Global Communication Remix Album (1995)

76:14 is the debut studio album by Global Communication, an English electronic music duo consisting of Tom Middleton and Mark Pritchard. Initially released via Dedicated Records on 1 June 1994, the album has been re-issued a number of times, most recently in 2020.

== Overview ==
The title of the album was intended to correspond to the record's total running time in minutes and seconds, though the actual runtime is shorter by only a few seconds. Likewise, each track on the album is correspondingly titled after its respective length. The duo has stated in the sleeve notes that this was intended to avoid implying any specific meaning to the music, thus leaving the listener completely free to interpret the music according to their own imagination. The song "14:31" was originally released on The Cyberdon EP by Mystic Institute (Paul Kent and Mark Pritchard) under the title of "Ob-Selon Mi-Nos (Re-Painted by Global Communication)"; in the liner notes, "ob - selon mi - nos" is printed in small letters overtop of "14:31". On vinyl, "0:54" appeared after "5:23".

In 2005, the album was reissued with a bonus disc featuring singles released before and after the album, as well as enhanced packaging and new liner notes from the group and notable fans of the album. Notably, the bonus tracks are more in the vein of house and jazz-influenced techno than the more ambient, mostly beatless album. The songs "Incidental Harmony" and "Sublime Creation", included on this re-issue, originally appeared as a bonus 12" single given away with original pressings of 76:14 on vinyl.

Influences were drawn from various sources including Brian Eno, Laraaji, Tangerine Dream, Vangelis, Kraftwerk, Peter Gabriel, Jean-Michel Jarre, Cocteau Twins, This Mortal Coil, Dead Can Dance, Ennio Morricone, the Smiths and the Cure. Middleton cited personal influences such as Prince, U2, the Human League, OMD and Depeche Mode.

== Reception ==
Professional ratings
Review scores
Source	Rating
AllMusic	5/5 stars
The Guardian	4/5 stars
Mojo	4/5 stars
NME	7/10
Q	4/5 stars
Slant Magazine	3.5/5 stars
Uncut	4/5 stars

76:14 is featured in The Guardian's 1,000 Albums to Hear Before You Die list, where it is described as an "unfathomably beautiful out-of-time masterpiece." In 1996, Mixmag ranked the album at number 11 in its list of the "Best Dance Albums of All Time".

== Track listing ==
All tracks are written by Tom Middleton and Mark Pritchard.

Original release
No.	Title	Length
1.	"4:02"	4:02
2.	"14:31"	14:31
3.	"9:25"	9:25
4.	"9:39"	9:39
5.	"7:39"	7:39
6.	"0:54"	0:54
7.	"8:07"	8:07
8.	"5:23" (alternatively titled "Maiden Voyage")	5:23
9.	"4:14"	4:14
10.	"12:18"	12:18
Total length:		76:12

Current digital release
No.	Title	Length
1.	"4:02"	4:02
2.	"14:31"	14:38
3.	"9:25"	9:34
4.	"9:39"	9:44
5.	"7:39"	7:39
6.	"0:54"	1:12
7.	"8:07"	8:10
8.	"5:23" (alternatively titled "Maiden Voyage")	5:22
9.	"4:14"	4:15
10.	"12:18"	12:17
Total length:		76:53

=== 2005 reissue bonus disc ===
1. "The Groove (Instrumental)" – 8:10
2. "The Way (Secret Ingredients Mix)" – 11:51
3. "The Deep (Original Mix)" – 11:10
4. "The Biosphere (Global Communication Remix)" – Reload – 9:05
5. "Incidental Harmony" – 8:33
6. "Sublime Creation" – 11:49
7. "Aspirin (Global Communication Remix)" – Sensorama – 12:56

== Charts ==
Chart (1994)	Peak position
UK Albums (Official Charts)	83

== Notes ==
- The track "14:31" was performed live in 2007 with a vocal chorus, and Tom Middleton on piano, and released as "Lament" on Tom Middleton's Excursions EP (2009).
- The track "5:23" is included in the 2008 video game Grand Theft Auto IV and appears on the soundtrack album The Music of Grand Theft Auto IV. In the digital release it is listed as "Maiden Voyage". This track is very similar to, but does not credit, the song "Love on a Real Train" by Tangerine Dream from the Risky Business soundtrack. They had remixed the song for a then upcoming Tangerine Dream remix album but had their effort rejected so released it as 5'23 instead.
- The track "9:39" uses a sound clip from the movie THX-1138 by George Lucas, and is referred to as both "9:37" and "9:39" on the CD packaging.
