= What's Happening (album) =

Studio album by Katalyst
- Released: 25 August 2007
- Recorded: 2006
- Genre: Australian hip-hop
- Label: Invada Records
- Producer: Katalyst

Katalyst chronology
Manipulating Agent (2002)	What's Happening (2007)	Deep Impressions (2011)

Singles from What's Happening
- 1. "All You've Got" Released: 2 June 2007; 2. "Say What You Feel" Released: 2007

What's Happening is the second album from the Australian hip-hop artist, Katalyst (aka Sydney-based producer Ashley Anderson). It is a follow-up to Katalyst's award-winning debut album, Manipulating Agent. What's Happening was released by Invada Records on 25 August 2007. The album features guest vocalists from the United States, the United Kingdom and Australia – including Stephanie McKay, J-Live, Steve Spacek, Diverse Katie Noonan (george), Magic Dirt's Adalita and the Beautiful Girls' Mat McHugh.

The album was selected as Triple J's featured album of the week in August 2007 and was nominated for the 2007 J Award. At the J Awards of 2007, the album was nominated for Australian Album of the Year.

It was nominated for Best Urban Release at the 2008 ARIA awards.

The first single lifted from the album was "All You've Got," which enjoyed rotation nationally as well as receiving rave reviews from overseas. The video clip featured some of Australia's top skaters and was on rotation on Channel V, MTV Australia and in the top 20 on J-TV. The single features Ru C.L, Hau (Koolism) and Yungun (UK MC). It was released as a 12", with an extended version of the song featuring Nfa, The Sleeping Monk, Mr Clean, Xela, The Tongue, as well as new verses from Hau & Ru C.L. It was also released as a digital download.

The second single "Say What You Feel" features New York City soul artist Stephanie McKay. This is not their first collaboration, Katalyst and McKay have worked together in the past collaborating on "Rising Tide" on her first album entitled McKay which was released by Polydor/Universal in 2003. The film clip for "Say What You Feel" features protest footage from the 1960s, 1970s and current day.

== Track listing ==
=== Original Release ===
1. "How Bout Us" (featuring Steve Spacek) – 3:43
2. "All You've Got" (featuring Ru C.L, Hau (Koolism), and Yungun) – 3:54
3. "I Know A Place" – 4:57
4. "Say What You Feel" (featuring Stephanie McKay) – 3:27
5. "Over And Over" (featuring Mat McHugh)) – 3:55
6. "May Have Been James Brown" – 4:26
7. "Loaded Gun" (featuring Joe Volk) – 3:37
8. "Dedicated" (featuring Diverse) – 3:22
9. "What Are We Talking About" – 4:17
10. "Step Up" (featuring Ru C.L) – 3:34
11. "War" – 1:00
12. "To Dust" (featuring Katie Noonan) – 3:17
13. "Killing Ya Self" (featuring J-Live) – 3:57
14. "He Is Society" – 3:55
15. "Bladewalker" (featuring Adalita) – 3:41

=== UK Version ===
(released in 2008 on BBE Records)

1. "Introductions"
2. "How Bout Us" (featuring Steve Spacek)
3. "All You've Got" (featuring Ru C.L, Hau (Koolism), and Yungun)
4. "I Know A Place"
5. "Say What You Feel" (featuring Stephanie McKay)
6. "Over And Over" (featuring Mat McHugh)
7. "Dedicated" (featuring Diverse)
8. "What Are We Talking About"
9. "Step Up" (featuring Ru C.L)
10. "War"
11. "Killing Ya Self" (featuring J-Live)
12. "He Is Society"
13. "Non-Stop" (featuring Supernatural)
14. "May Have Been James Brown"
15. "Loaded Gun" (featuring Joe Volk)

== Charts ==
Chart (2007)	Peak position
Australian (ARIA Charts)	72
