= This Picture =

This Picture may refer to:

- This Picture (band), an English alternative rock band
- "This Picture" (song), a 2003 single by Placebo
