= Quakers (album) =

Studio album by Quakers
- Released: 26 March 2012
- Genre: Hip-hop
- Length: 69:57
- Label: Stones Throw
- Producer: Fuzzface (Geoff Barrow); 7-Stu-7; Katalyst

Quakers chronology
Quakers (2012)	Supa K: Heavy Tremors (2020)

Quakers is the debut studio album by Quakers, a hip-hop supergroup consisting of producers Fuzzface (Geoff Barrow), 7-Stu-7, and Katalyst. It was released on Stones Throw Records on 26 March 2012. The CD edition comes with a full instrumental version as a bonus disc.

== Critical reception ==
Professional ratings
Aggregate scores
Source	Rating
Metacritic	80/100
Review scores
Source	Rating
AllMusic	4.5/5 stars
Beats Per Minute	87%
Clash	9/10
Consequence of Sound	D
MusicOMH	4/5 stars
NME	6/10
Okayplayer	91/100
Pitchfork	7.1/10

At Metacritic, which assigns a weighted average score out of 100 to reviews from mainstream critics, the album received an average score of 80, based on 14 reviews, indicating "generally favorable reviews".

Chase McMullen of Beats Per Minute wrote: "As both a display of production mastery, and as a hip-hop effort, Quakers is one of the most consistently refreshing albums in recent memory." Heather Phares of AllMusic commented that "since there's so much talent involved and the tracks are so short (Estee Nack's meditative 'Lost and Found' is the longest at just over four minutes), the bright spots come at listeners thick and fast." She added, "Quakers is the kind of album where favorite tracks change from listen to listen, and a testament to hip-hop's enduring power."

== Track listing ==
No.	Title	Length
1.	"Intro"	0:17
2.	"Big Cat" (featuring Synato Watts)	2:10
3.	"Fitta Happier" (featuring MED and Guilty Simpson)	2:41
4.	"Smoke" (featuring Jonwayne)	2:09
5.	"The Lo"	0:41
6.	"Russia with Love" (featuring Coin Locker Kid)	2:23
7.	"What Chew Want" (featuring Tone Tank)	2:22
8.	"Flapjacksmm"	0:18
9.	"Jobless" (featuring Quite Nyce)	1:46
10.	"Sidewinder" (featuring Buff1)	2:12
11.	"Mummy" (featuring Diverse)	2:15
12.	"Belly of the Beast" (featuring Emilio Rojas)	1:22
13.	"Up the Rovers"	1:15
14.	"The Turk" (featuring King Magnetic)	1:30
15.	"There It Is" (featuring The Champs)	2:04
16.	"RIP"	1:07
17.	"I Like to Dance" (featuring Krondon and General Steele)	2:12
18.	"Dark City Lights" (featuring Frank Nitty)	1:17
19.	"The Beginning" (featuring Coin Locker Kid)	1:55
20.	"Kreem"	1:04
21.	"War Drums" (featuring Phat Kat and Guilty Simpson)	2:29
22.	"R.A.I.D." (featuring Lyric Jones)	1:34
23.	"Fresh"	0:13
24.	"Something Beautiful"	0:47
25.	"Chicken Livers" (featuring F.C. the Truth)	1:26
26.	"Rock My Soul" (featuring Prince Po)	1:31
27.	"Lost and Found" (featuring Estee Nack)	4:03
28.	"My Mantra" (featuring Dave Dub)	2:17
29.	"Hunnypots of Beeswax"	0:26
30.	"TV Dreaming" (featuring Booty Brown)	2:29
31.	"Don't Make It Worthless"	0:49
32.	"Soul Power" (featuring Dead Prez)	3:00
33.	"Glide"	0:24
34.	"Get Live" (featuring Coin Locker Kid)	2:24
35.	"Sign Language" (featuring Aloe Blacc)	2:15
36.	"Earth Quaking" (featuring Akil)	1:23
37.	"You're Gonna Be Sorry"	0:45
38.	"Outlaw" (featuring Deed)	1:50
39.	"The Tax Man" (featuring Sareem Poems)	1:39
40.	"Chucky Balboa" (featuring Silverust)	2:50
41.	"Oh Goodness" (featuring Finale)	1:54
Total length:		69:57
