= Pentamerous Metamorphosis =

Remix album by Global Communication
- Released: December 1993
- Recorded: 1993
- Genre: Ambient techno, Ambient
- Length: 61:10
- Label: Dedicated Records
- Producer: Mark Pritchard, Tom Middleton

Global Communication chronology
A Collection of Short Stories (1993)	Pentamerous Metamorphosis (1993)	76:14 (1994)

Professional ratings
Review scores
Source	Rating
AllMusic	3/5 stars
Pitchfork	8.2/10

Pentamerous Metamorphosis is a remix album by Global Communication originally released in 1993 on Dedicated Records. It is a reworking of the Blood Music album by Chapterhouse and was originally only available as a bonus CD bundled with the Chapterhouse album. It was released as a standalone album later the same year, and then re-released in 1998 in an edited version.

== Track listing ==
No.	Title	Length
1.	"Alpha Phase"	16:39
2.	"Beta Phase"	10:49
3.	"Gamma Phase"	11:45
4.	"Delta Phase"	10:41
5.	"Epsilon Phase"	11:18
Total length:		61:10

- "Beta Phase" is primarily a remix of Chapterhouse's Don't Look Now.
- "Gamma Phase" is primarily a remix of Chapterhouse's There's Still Life and Deli.
- "Delta Phase" is primarily a remix of Chapterhouse's We Are the Beautiful.
- "Epsilon Phase" is primarily a remix Chapterhouse's Love Forever.

== Notes ==
The 1998 re-release was remastered and had minor changes to two tracks: (Beta Phase) to remove an uncleared sample from the film Return of the Jedi and (Delta Phase) was shortened by eight bars.

The removed sample:

EV-9D9: "How many languages do you speak?"
C-3PO: "I am fluent in over six million forms of communication"

Though the album is ostensibly a remix album, very little of the unremixed Chapterhouse music remains intact in the remixed tracks, with at most one or two samples clearly recognizable on each track.

Mark Pritchard commenting on the difference between the original '93 release and the '98 re-release at Reload Online said "yeah, the difference was no c3po (in the intro of original beta phase) as things were getting a little hot with the jedi knights thing, and one of the tracks has 8 bars edited out of it. i think it was track 4 (delta phase)"

Tom Middleton commenting on the creation of Pentamerous Metamorphosis in the liner notes to the 76:14 album remaster/reissue said "One day we got a call from Andy Sheriff from Chapterhouse who loved our work, and asked if we wanted to remix their entire album? What an amazing opportunity. Sampling from the multi-track tapes, embellishing the themes and distilling the lyrical content from Blood Music into five new pieces. The result was Pentamerous Metamorphosis."
