= Balloon (band) =

Balloon were an early 1990s music duo from London, consisting of Ian Bickerton and David Sheppard. Their first album, Gravity, was released in 1992 by Dedicated Records, a British record label known for neo-psychedelia.

== Biography ==
Bickerton and Sheppard met in 1988. They recorded more than 60 demo tracks before they were signed by Dedicated Records.

Critic Eve Zibart of The Washington Post described the band's music as "a peculiarly soothing mix of Feargal Sharkey, Storyville, white soul, mild social unrest punk and Leonard Cohen." Jae-Ha Kim of the Chicago Sun-Times wrote, "Balloon's music is atmospheric and winsome, with acoustic guitars caressing velvety voices."

Their first album, Gravity, was released in 1992. Produced by Michael Brook, the record featured contributions from Sarah McLachlan (on the track "Tightrope Walker") and James Pinker. Bickerton wrote the music and lyrics, while Sheppard played all sorts of instruments. The album was recorded mostly in New Orleans, at Daniel Lanois' studio. The duo toured the US in 1992, with percussionist James Pinker as a touring member.

Balloon supported Bill Hicks on his final UK tour, including performing at the Tivoli Theatre in Dublin, Ireland, on Dec 1st 1992.

Balloon played one-off shows for Violette Societa at the Social, London WC1, in November 2016, and Leaf, Liverpool, in November 2022. In late 2024, Balloon released Gas 'n' Air, a new LP recorded in Mexico City.
