= Global Communication =

British electronic music act

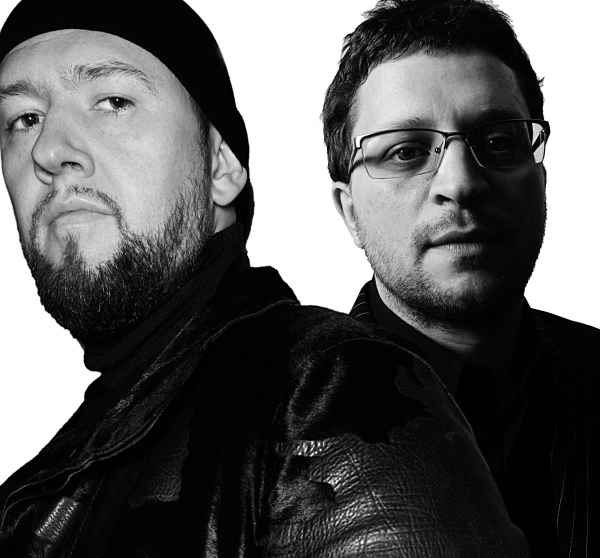
- Tom Middleton (left) and Mark Pritchard (right)

Background information
- Origin: Yeovil, England
- Genres: Ambient; electronica; house; chillout; downtempo; techno
- Years active: 1992–present
- Labels: Dedicated Records / Evolution / Universal Language Productions Ltd.
- Members: Mark Pritchard; Tom Middleton
- Website: Reload official website

Global Communication is an electronic music duo consisting of Tom Middleton and Mark Pritchard; the duo have also recorded under other aliases, including Reload and Jedi Knights. They founded the labels Evolution Records and Universal Language Productions. Their 1994 album 76:14, released on Dedicated Records, became an acclaimed work of 1990s ambient and electronic music.

== Biography ==
The duo's work as Global Communication focused on warmer rhythms and ambience in comparison to their recordings as Reload, which were eerie but danceable. They have also recorded as Jedi Knights, Secret Ingredients, The Chameleon, Link, and E621. The duo have produced remixes for various artists under each of their aliases, including a 1993 Reload remix of "On" by Aphex Twin and a 1997 Jedi Knights remix of "Home" by Depeche Mode.

They revived the Global Communication name in 2006 for the mix album Fabric 26.

Their song "5:23" features on the Grand Theft Auto 4 radio station The Journey.

== Discography ==
Original work as Global Communication

- Keongaku EP (1992)
- 76:14 (1994)
- Maiden Voyage (2xEP) (1994)
- Remotion: The Global Communication Remix Album (1995)
- The Way/The Deep EP (1996)
- The Groove EP (1997)
- Transmissions Boxset (Pentamerous Metamorphosis, 76:14, Singles/Remixes/Curated Bonus Tracks, 3xCD/7xLP All Remastered) (2020)

Mixes as Global Communication

- Pentamerous Metamorphosis (1993)
- Fabric 26 (DJ Mix 1/2 by Mark Pritchard, 1/2 by Tom Middleton) (2006)
- Back In The Box (2xCD DJ Mix) (2011)

As Reload (at first, a Pritchard solo project, later including Middleton)

- Reload EP (1992) – (Remaster/Reissue 2006)
- Auto-Reload EP (1992) – (Remaster/Reissue 2006)
- Amenity EP/Cyberdon EP (Reload Remixes) (1993) – (Cyberdon Remaster/Reissue: 2007)
- A Collection of Short Stories (1993)
- Archives EP (1997)

As Reload & E621

- Auto-Reload EP (1992)
- Auto-Reload EP Vol. 2 (1993)
- The Biosphere EP (1993)
- Evolution Remaster/Reissue of Reload EP, Auto-Reload EP and The Biosphere EP (3x12") (2006)

As Link & E621

- Antacid EP (1995)

As The Chameleon

- Links EP (1995)

As Secret Ingredients

- New York New York (1996)
- Chicago Chicago (1996)

As Jedi Knights

- May The Funk Be With You EP (1995)
- New School Science (1996)
- The Big Ones EP (1997)
- Return of the Jedis (Promo) (1999)
- Jedi Selector (2000)

Evolution Records Compilation

- The Theory of Evolution (1995)

=== Remixes ===
As Global Communication

- Mystic Institute: "Ob-Selon Mi-Nos (Repainted By Global Communication" (1993)
- Reload & E621: "The Biosphere (Global Communication Remix)" (1993)
- Link: "Arcadian (Global Communication Remix)" (1994)
- Warp 69: "Natural High (Global Communication Re-Take)" (1994)
- Nav Katze: "Wild Horse (Global Mix Communication)" (1994)
- The Grid: "Rollercoaster (The Global Communication Yellow Submarine Re-Take)" (1994)
- Palmskin Productions: "Evolution of The Beast (Part 2) (Global Communication Mix)" (1994)
- Soft Ballet: "Ride (Global Communication Dub Mix)" (1995)
- Jon Anderson: "Bless This (Global Communication Mix)" (1995)
- Jon Anderson: "Amor Real (Global Communication Mix)" (1995)
- Azymuth: "Jazz Carnival (Global Communication's Space Jazz Mix)" (1996)
- PJ Harvey & John Parish: "Civil War Correspondent (Global Communication Mix)" (1996)
- Sensorama: "Aspirin (Global Communication Remix)" (1996)
- Lamb: "Gorecki (Global Communication Mix)" (1997)
- Dusky: "Skin Deep (Global Communication Remix & Global Communication Dub)" (2015)

As Reload

- Mystic Institute: "QA-752L-P (Reload Remix)" (1993)
- Mystic Institute: "NS-581A-T (Reload Remix)" (1993)
- Slowdive: "In Mind (The Reload 147 Take)" (1993)
- Aphex Twin: "On (Reload Remix)" (1993)
- Nav Katze: "Crazy Dream (The Reload Retro 313 Future Memory Mix)" (1994)
- Confusion: "Drawing (Sound Sculpture by Reload)" (1994)
- Schaft: "Visual Cortex (The Reload Re-difinition)" (1994)

As Jedi Knights

- Link & E621: "Antacid (Jedi Knights Remix)" (1995)
- Bomb the Bass: "Absorber (Jedi Knights Remixes 1 & 2)" (1995)
- Model 500: "The Flow (Jedi Knights Remix)" (1995)
- Nicolette: "We Never Know (Jedi Knights Remix)" (1995) (unreleased)
- Depeche Mode: "Home (Jedi Knights Remix)" (1997)
- Leftfield: "Afrika Shox (Jedis Elastic Bass Remix)" (1999)
- Underworld: "Jumbo (Jedis Electro Dub & Sugar Hit Remix)" (1999)

As The Chameleon

- Palmskin Productions: "Evolution of The Beast (Part 1) (The Chameleon Remix)" (1994)
- Link: "Amazon Amenity (The Chameleon Remix)" (1995)

As Secret Ingredients

- Global Communication: "The Way (Secret Ingredients Remix)" (1996)
- The Jedis: "Disco Magic (Secret Ingredients Remix)" (1999)

As Link & E621

- Global Communication: "7:39 (Link & E621 Appliance of Science Mix)" (1994)

== See also ==
- List of ambient music artists
