= Lifetracks =

Studio album by Tom Middleton
- Released: October 1, 2007
- Recorded: 1998–2007
- Genre: Ambient/Techno/Electronic music
- Length: 69:30
- Label: Big Chill Recordings, Six Degrees Records
- Producer: Tom Middleton

Lifetracks is the debut solo album by British electronica artist Tom Middleton, released in the UK on October 1, 2007, and the US on November 6, 2007. The title is a reference to representing different places, times, and people in the artist's life.

The majority of songs on the album have appeared on compilations over the last ten years, under the moniker AMBA, which was Middleton's previous ambient project. The song "Shinkansen" refers to the Japanese bullet train of the same name. The song "St. Ives Bay" refers to an area in the artist's home region of Cornwall, England.

== Track listing ==
All tracks written by Tom Middleton.

1. "Prana" – 4:47
2. "Beginning of the Middle" – 5:25
3. "Shinkansen" – 8:23
4. "Serendipity" – 4:24
5. "Sea of Glass" – 3:19
6. "Yearning" – 6:01
7. "Optimystic" – 6:32
8. "St. Ives Bay" – 6:25
9. "Margherita" – 6:15
10. "Moonbathing" – 8:02
11. "Astral Projection" – 4:43
12. "Enchanting" - 5:14
