= The Family Cat =

British indie rock band

- Origin: Stoke Newington, London, England
- Genres: Garage punk; indie rock; garage rock
- Years active: 1988–1995
- Labels: Bad Girl; Dedicated; RCA
- Members: Paul Frederick; John Graves; Kev Downing; Tim McVay; Steve Jelbert

The Family Cat were a British indie rock band, formed in Stoke Newington, London in 1988, although three of the five members were originally from Cornwall, Plymouth and Southampton.

== Career ==
The band played live for five years and recorded three albums, the mini-album Tell 'Em We're Surfin', (produced by The Jam's drummer Rick Buckler) released on South London independent label Bad Girl Records, and its full-length follow-ups, Furthest from the Sun and Magic Happens, released by Dedicated Records. The band never quite capitalised on the momentum generated by the success of debut single "Tom Verlaine", which was named 'Single of the Week' by the NME, although the band's final LP, Magic Happens entered the lower reaches of the UK Albums Chart and "Airplane Gardens", lasted for one week in the UK Singles Chart. The Family Cat placed several singles on the UK Indie Chart including "Steamroller".

Between 1989 and 1992, the band recorded three Peel Sessions at Maida Vale Studios, and were included in John Peel's Festive Fifty in 1989.

They also grabbed headlines by naming one of their songs "Bring Me the Head of Michael Portillo". Their music was melodic and radio friendly, but in spite of critical acclaim the band were unable to reach the heights of Britpop acts Oasis and Blur.

Amongst their cover versions were The Beatles' "Across the Universe", The Rolling Stones' "Rocks Off" and Scott Walker's "Montague Terrace (in Blue)".

In 2013, Five Lives Left, an anthology features four songs from the album that the band started working on but never released, was released on 3 Loop Music.

== Members ==
- Paul Frederick – (guitar, vocals)
- Stephen Jelbert – (lead guitar)
- Tim McVay – (guitar)
- John Graves – (bass guitar)
- Kevin Downing – (drums)

== Discography ==
=== Albums ===
Year	Album	Billboard 200	UK Albums Chart	Top Digital Albums	UK Indie Chart	Label
1989	Tell 'Em We're Surfin	-	-	-	6	Badgirl
1992	Furthest from the Sun	-	55	-		Dedicated Records
1994	Magic Happens	-	84	-		Dedicated Records
2013	Five Lives Left (An Anthology)	-	-	-		3 Loop Music

=== Singles/EPs ===
- "Tom Verlaine" (1989) Bad Girl (7-inch flexi-disc/12-inch) (UK Indie No. 6)
- "Remember What It Is that You Love" (1990) Bad Girl
- "Place With a Name" (1990) Bad Girl
- "Colour Me Grey" (1991) Bad Girl
- "Jesus Christ" (1991) Clawfist
- "Steamroller" (1992) Dedicated
- "River of Diamonds" (1992) Dedicated
- "Airplane Gardens" (1993) Dedicated (UK No. 69)
- "Springing the Atom" (1993) Dedicated
- "Wonderful Excuse" (1994) Dedicated/RCA (UK No. 48)
- Goldenbook EP (1994) Dedicated/RCA (UK No. 42)

== After The Family Cat ==
Steve Jelbert is an arts review writer for The Independent.
