= The Four Worlds =

2018 studio album

Studio album by Mark Pritchard
- Released: 23 March 2018
- Genre: Electronic; ambient
- Length: 32:59
- Label: Warp
- Producer: Mark Pritchard

Mark Pritchard chronology
Under the Sun (Expanded Vol. 1) (2017)	The Four Worlds (2018)	MP Productions - EP 1 (2020)

Singles from The Four Worlds
- 1. "Come Let Us" Released: 7 February 2018; 2. "Parkstone Melody II" Released: 8 March 2018

The Four Worlds is the eleventh studio album by English electronic musician Mark Pritchard, released on 23 March 2018 through Warp Records. The album's artwork, an accompanying 13 minute film and a virtual reality experience were made by Jonathan Zawada.

The album was supported with two accompanying singles; "Come Let Us", released on 7 February, and "Parkstone Melody II", released on 8 March. The Four Worlds received positive reviews, describing it as a continuation of the sound seen on Under the Sun.

== Music ==
The Four Worlds has been described as electronic and ambient. Critics noted how both its sound and art direction were a continuation of Pritchard's previous album, Under the Sun. The album is largely beatless.

"Glasspops" is an exception, being described as a gentle and thumping 11-minute opener. The track was originally recorded in an air raid shelter in Hamburg, before being refined. "Circle of Fear" is an ominous track with a softly circling melody. "Come Let Us" is an eerie spoken word piece with vocals from Gregory Whitehead, built around a repeated quote from the Book of Genesis. "The Arched Window" uses a harpsichord-like melody that "[envokes] a skyward sense of ecstasy".

"S.O.S." is a "strangely hopeful" spoken word track, with vocals from The Space Lady and haunting chords. "Parkstone Melody II" is a "graceful" and "ghostly" song that makes use of a musical saw. "Mên-an-Tol" has sweeping strings, prominent use of organ and wordless choir vocals. Closer "The Four Worlds" makes use of a waterphone and a sequence of decayed gong sounds.

== Release ==
The album was announced on 7 February, along with the release of the first single, "Come Let Us". The second single, "Parkstone Melody II", was released on 8 March. The Four Worlds was released on 23 March 2018 through Warp. The album's artwork was created by Jonathan Zawada, who had previously worked with Pritchard on the artwork for Under the Sun. Zawada also created the album's music videos and a 13-minute short film in support of it. On 12 July, a virtual reality experience themed around the album was hosted in New York.

== Reception ==
Professional ratings
Aggregate scores
Source	Rating
Metacritic	74/100
Review scores
Source	Rating
AllMusic	3.5/5 stars
Le Devoir	3.5/5 stars
Loud and Quiet	3/10
Pitchfork	7.6/10
Resident Advisor	6.6/10

At Metacritic, which aggregates scores from mainstream critics, The Four Worlds has an average score of 74 based on 6 reviews, indicating a score of "generally favourable". Writing for AllMusic, Andy Kellman called the album an extension of Under the Sun both graphically and musically and noted how each track created a "distinct scene". Matt Mullen of Inverted Audio wrote how individual tracks lacked sense, but together "[cohered] into something weirdly beautifuil". Philippe Renaud of Le Devoir wrote how the album focused more on atmospherics, calling it "enchanting".

Writer Ben Cardew of Pitchfork said that "The Four Worlds is proof that restraint can sing louder than excess", and described how it left listeners wanting more. Larry Fitzmaurice of Resident Advisor noted how the "dank ambience" of the album would surprise those who followed Pritchards career, although it would "drift into tedium" at times. Bruce Tantum of XLR8R called it a "fully-formed album" that was "full of quiet passion".

Dafydd Jenkins of Loud and Quiet gave a more negative review, calling it a "lacklustre chronicle" and calling the spoken word tracks "vague, Radiohead-shallow political "commentary"".

== Track listing ==
All music is composed by Mark Pritchard.

The Four Worlds track listing
No.	Title	Length
1.	"Glasspops"	11:27
2.	"Circle of Fear"	3:06
3.	"Come Let Us" (featuring Gregory Whitehead)	2:56
4.	"The Arched Window"	3:03
5.	"S.O.S." (featuring The Space Lady)	3:13
6.	"Parkstone Melody II"	3:04
7.	"Mên-an-Tol"	1:32
8.	"The Four Worlds"	4:35
Total length:		32:59

Digital bonus track
No.	Title	Length
9.	"Sentinel - Process Hate - Hope"	8:59
Total length:		41:58

== Personnel ==
Credits adapted from the liner notes.

- Mark Pritchard – production, mixing, writing
- Jonathan Zawada – design
- Gregory Whitehead – vocals, writing (track 3)
- Susan Schneider – vocals, writing (track 5)
- Jason Mitchell – mastering
