= Africa Hitech =

Electronic music duo

- Origin: London, England
- Genres: UK garage, grime, juke house
- Years active: 2007–present
- Label: Warp
- Members: Mark Pritchard; Steve Spacek

Africa Hitech is an electronic music duo consisting of Mark Pritchard and Steve Spacek. They released their first EP Blen in April 2010 and a second, Hitecherous, in June 2010. Their debut album 93 Million Miles was released in May 2011.

== Reception ==
Pitchfork gave 93 Million Miles a review of 8.2, writing "It's no small feat to craft something this adventurous and eclectic and still have it turn out to share the cohesion of a DJ mix, but Africa Hitech manage just that-- and despite all the left turns, you want to stick by their side every step of the way".

== Discography ==
=== Albums ===
- 93 Million Miles (Warp, 2011)

=== EPs ===
- 2010: Blen (Warp, 2010)
- 2010: Hitecherous (Warp, 2010)
- 2011: Out in the Streets (VIP) (Warp, 2011)
- 2011: Do U Really Wanna Fight (Warp, 2011)
