= When Machines Exceed Human Intelligence =

Studio album by Harmonic 313 (Mark Pritchard)
- Released: 2 February 2009
- Genre: Electronic
- Length: 58:02
- Label: Warp

Mark Pritchard chronology
Music for Film, Television & Radio Volume One (2005)	When Machines Exceed Human Intelligence (2009)	93 Million Miles (2011)

When Machines Exceed Human Intelligence is a studio album by Mark Pritchard as Harmonic 313, released on Warp Records on 2 February 2009. Featured vocalists include Phat Kat, Elzhi, and Steve Spacek. An edition of the album was also released containing a 2×LP with an alternate track listing.

Album track "Dirtbox" was released as an EP in 2008.

== Track listing ==
When Machines Exceed Human Intelligence digital and CD track listing
No.	Title	Length
1.	"Dirtbox"	4:29
2.	"Cyclotron"	4:42
3.	"No Way Out"	4:22
4.	"Music Substitute System"	0:43
5.	"Köln"	3:46
6.	"Galag-A"	3:36
7.	"Word Problems"	5:24
8.	"Battlestar" (featuring Phat Kat and Elzhi)	3:04
9.	"Cyclotron C64 SID"	1:08
10.	"Call to Arms"	4:35
11.	"Flaash"	6:38
12.	"Don't Panic"	4:43
13.	"Falling Away" (featuring Steve Spacek)	4:16
14.	"When Machines Exceed Human Intelligence"	0:31
15.	"Quadrant 3"	6:05
Total length:		58:02

2×LP edition track listing
No.	Title	Length
1.	"When Machines Exceed Human Intelligence"	0:29
2.	"Cyclotron"	4:40
3.	"No Way Out"	4:21
4.	"Battlestar"	3:02
5.	"Music Substitute System"	0:43
6.	"Köln"	3:45
7.	"Galag-A"	3:35
8.	"Flaash"	6:37
9.	"Don't Panic"	4:42
10.	"Cyclotron C64 SID"	0:51
11.	"Falling Away"	4:15
12.	"Quadrant 3"	6:03
Total length:		43:03
