= Space Invadas =

Australian rap group

- Origin: Australia
- Members: Katalyst; Steve Spacek

Space Invadas is an Australian hip-hop duo made up of Katalyst (Ashley Anderson) and Steve Spacek (Steve White). Their album, Soul:Fi (22 March 2010), was nominated at the ARIA Music Awards of 2010 for Best Urban Album. It peaked at No. 20 on the ARIA Hitseekers Albums chart.

== Band members ==
- Katalyst
- Steve Spacek

== Discography ==
- Soul:Fi (22 March 2010) – Invada Records/Inertia Records (INVCD034) AUS Hitseekers: No. 20
- Done It Again (2010) - Barely Breaking Even
- Wild World (2018) - Invada Records
