= Quakers (band) =

British hip-hop group

- Genres: Hip-hop
- Years active: 2012–present
- Label: Stones Throw
- Members: Fuzzface (Geoff Barrow); 7-Stu-7; Katalyst

Quakers are an indie rap group consisting of three producers; Fuzzface (Geoff Barrow), 7-Stu-7, and Katalyst. Their debut studio album, Quakers, was released in 2012 and features a host of guest rappers, many of whom the band discovered using MySpace. The group is signed to Stones Throw Records.

== History ==
Quakers' debut studio album, Quakers, was released in 2012. At Metacritic, which assigns a weighted average score out of 100 to reviews from mainstream critics, the album received an average score of 80, based on 14 reviews, indicating "generally favorable reviews". The album has been listed as number 41 in Amazon UK's top 100 albums of 2012. It also made Gilles Peterson's BBC Radio "Best of 2012" list.

In 2020, Quakers released a 50-track beat tape, Supa K: Heavy Tremors.

The group has no known affiliation with the Religious Society of Friends, also known as Quakers.

== Discography ==
=== Studio albums ===
- Quakers (Stones Throw, 2012)
- Supa K: Heavy Tremors (Stones Throw, 2020)
- II - The Next Wave (Stones Throw, 2020)

=== Mixtapes ===
- Hip-Hop Quake Mix (Stones Throw, 2012)
