= Back in the Game (song) =

2025 single by Mark Pritchard and Thom Yorke

Single by Mark Pritchard and Thom Yorke

from the album Tall Tales
- Released: 13 February 2025
- Genre: Electronic; rock; alternative
- Length: 4:41
- Label: Warp
- Producers: Mark Pritchard; Thom Yorke

Mark Pritchard singles chronology
"In My Heart" (2020)	"Back in the Game" (2025)	"This Conversation is Missing Your Voice" (2025)

Thom Yorke singles chronology
"Knife Edge / Prize Giving" (2024)	"Back in the Game" (2025)	"This Conversation is Missing Your Voice" (2025)

"Back in the Game" is a song by the English musicians Mark Pritchard and Thom Yorke. The first single from Tall Tales, it was released on 13 February 2025 through Warp Records. It is the second collaboration between Pritchard and Yorke after 2016's "Beautiful People".

== Background ==
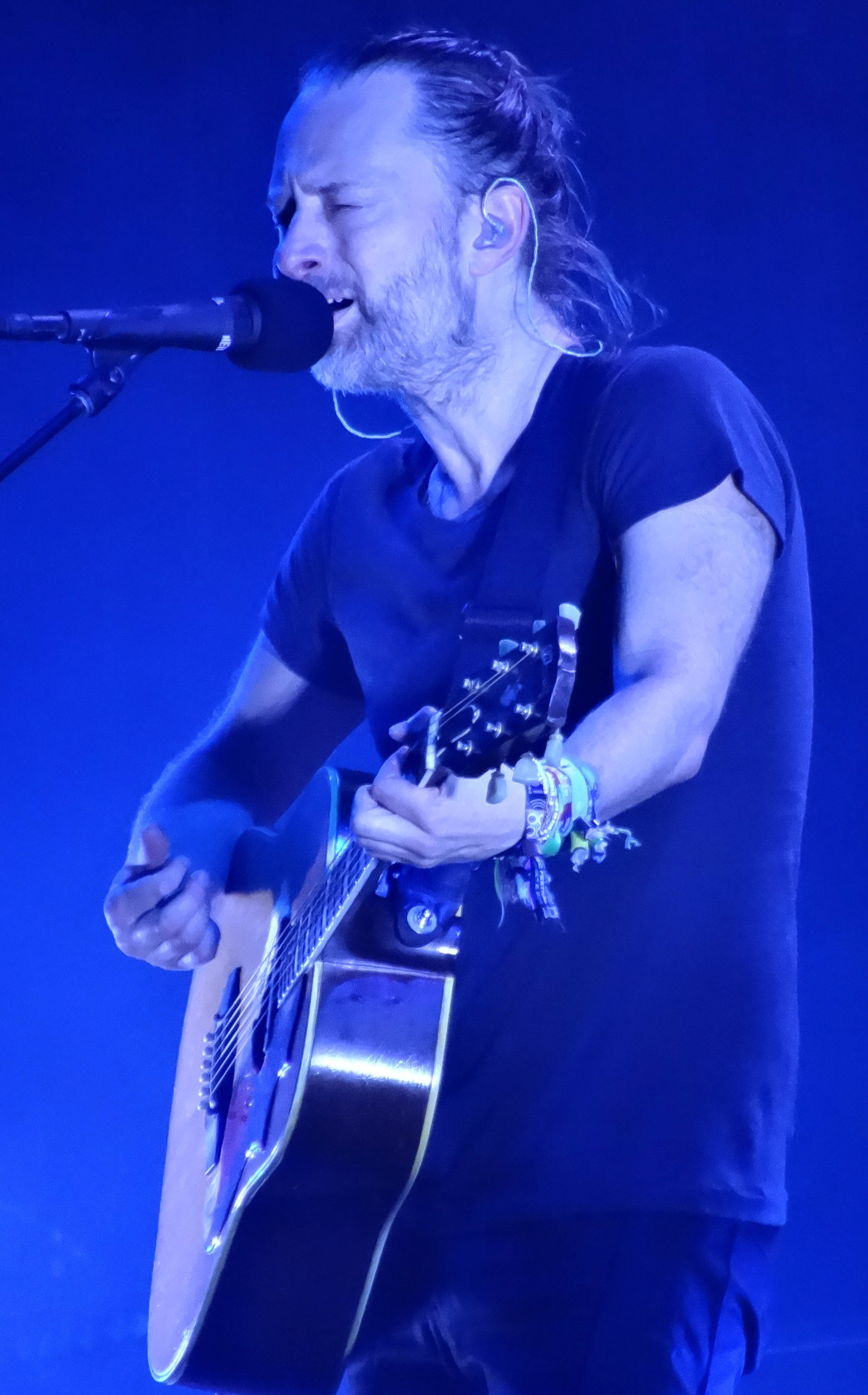
Yorke, pictured, playing live in 2016

Pritchard had previously collaborated with Yorke, creating two remixes of the track "Bloom" by Radiohead for their remix album, TKOL RMX 1234567. One of these remixes appeared under the alias of "Harmonic 313". Yorke's vocals were also featured on Pritchard's 2016 track, "Beautiful People". Yorke performed "Back in the Game" in 2024 during his Everything solo tour of Australia and Asia. He first performed it in Christchurch.

== Composition ==
"Back in the Game" has been described as electronic, alternative and rock. Tom Breihan of Stereogum called the track "woozy" and "slippery". The track opens with an eerie synthesiser-based beat. Daisy Carter of DIY called the instrumental aspects of the track a "glitchy, immersive electronic soundscape". The track also makes use of a bass motif throughout, which one critic likened to the sound of a tuba. Andy Price of MusicRadar called the track a "strident, electronic menace".

Many critics noted Yorke's digitally modified vocals throughout the track. Yorke's vocals were digitally warped and distorted by Pritchard with the use of a H910 Harmonizer. Critics stated these modified vocals lent an eerie and mysterious aspect.

== Release ==
"Back in the Game" was originally teased on social media. On 7 February 2025, Yorke and Pritchard posted a video clip on Instagram with the song title and release date. On 13 February, the track was released on streaming platforms through Warp.

A music video was released alongside the single. The video was created by Jonathan Zawada, and features "eccentric, monstrous-looking" masked figures slowly walking through a variety of streets. Critics likened the visuals to fever dreams and nightmares. Zawada said the bassline inspired the video, comparing it to a scene in the 1983 film Staying Alive. Over time, Zawada visualised characters with giant heads and fixed expressions of mania. He said the video highlighted "where we choose to place value in our collective cultural expression" and "how we collectively confront major cultural shifts in the 21st century".
