= Fabric 25 =

Compilation album by Carl Craig
- Released: December 6, 2005
- Genre: Electronic
- Length: 73:13
- Label: Fabric
- Producer: Carl Craig

Fabric Mix Series chronology
Fabric 24 (2005)	Fabric 25 (2005)	Fabric 26 (2006)

Professional ratings
Review scores
Source	Rating
About.com	4/5 stars
AllMusic	4/5 stars
JIVE	4/5 stars
Tiny Mix Tapes	2.5/5 stars

Fabric 25 is a DJ mix compilation album by Carl Craig released as part of the Fabric Mix Series.

== Track listing ==
1. Ying Yang Twins - Wait (The Whisper Song) - TVT Records – 2:29
2. Carl Craig - Angel (Caya Dub) - Planet E – 3:50
3. Trickski - Sweat - Sonar Kollektiv – 4:34
4. Kerri Chandler - Bar A Thym - Nite Grooves/King St – 5:42
5. Just One - Love2Love (Phlash Edit) - Neroli Productions – 3:33
6. Megablast - Jupita (Stereotyp Remix) - Luv Lite Recordings – 4:27
7. Scott Grooves - The Journey - From The Studio Of Scott Grooves – 2:17
8. Africanism - Imbalaye - Yellow Productions – 2:17
9. Blaze/UDA/Barbara Tucker - Most Precious Love (DF Future 3000 Instrumental) - Nite Grooves/King St – 5:46
10. Rayon - The Panther (Rubber Re-Edit) - Crosstown Rebel Music/Rebelone – 4:33
11. Soundstream - 3rd Movement - Soundstream – 4:03
12. Dark Comedy - Good God - Art of Dance Records – 5:12
13. D'Malicious - Alive - Wave Music – 4:25
14. Pasta Boys - Limit - Disco Inn – 4:40
15. DJ Yoav B. - Energize - Wabi Sabi/Nomorewords – 4:46
16. Nick Petty/Shamus Coghlan - Crushing - Missing Unit – 2:12
17. Carl Craig - Darkness - Planet E – 4:34
18. Tokyo Black Star - Blade Dancer (Dixon Edit) - Sonar Kollektiv – 3:45
