= A Collection of Short Stories (Reload album) =

Studio album by Reload
- Released: 1993
- Genre: IDM; ambient; techno
- Length: 75:52
- Label: Infonet Records inf 4 Creation
- Producer: Mark Pritchard; Tom Middleton

Reload chronology
A Collection of Short Stories (1993)	Pentamerous Metamorphosis (1993)

Professional ratings
Review scores
Source	Rating
AllMusic	4.5/5 stars

A Collection of Short Stories is the debut album by British electronic music duo Reload, consisting of Mark Pritchard and Tom Middleton, who also released music as Global Communication. The booklet contains an introduction and six short stories written by Dominic Fripp.

== Track listing ==
Source: Discogs

No.	Title	Length
1.	"Teq"	6:19
2.	"Peschi"	7:00
3.	"Ahn"	6:19
4.	"Rota Link"	3:27
5.	"1642 Try 621"	12:22
6.	"Ev-i-loy"	4:26
7.	"Akzinor"	0:58
8.	"Mosh"	5:40
9.	"Ehn"	9:12
10.	"Psychophylaxis"	0:30
11.	"Le soleil et la mer"	8:05
12.	"The Enlightenment"	5:22
13.	"Event Horizon"	5:58

== Credits ==
All tracks written, arranged and produced by Mark Pritchard. Tracks 8, 9, 11 co-written by Tom Middleton. Additional production and engineering on tracks 1, 2, 5, 6, 8, 9, 11, 13 by Middleton. "Mosh" engineered by 'Head' at The Icehouse.

The introduction and short stories written by Dominic Fripp. Additional brainstorming and concepts for short stories by Middleton.
