= Nav Katze =

Japanese musical duo

Nav Katze (ナーヴ・カッツェ) was a female music duo from Tokyo, Japan consisting of Naoko Iimura (飯村直子) (guitar) and Miwako Yamaguchi (山口美和子) (vocals and bass).

== History ==
The band was formed in 1984 with a third member, Shino Furutachi (古舘詩乃) (drums). After having released two records on the SWITCH label, they made their major debut on Victor Music Industries (Victor Entertainment) with the album Kanki. Shino Furutachi left the band in 1991 after this album. Later, they collaborated with famous rock band Luna Sea.

Several of their songs have been remixed by well-known electronic musicians, such as Aphex Twin, The Black Dog, Autechre, and Global Communication.

== Discography ==
Original Albums

- Nav Katze EP (1986)
- OyZaC (1987)
- Kanki (歓喜) (1991)
- Shingetsu (新月) (1991)
- The Last Rose in Summer (1992)
- OUT (1994) with the participation of Luna Sea's members and Maki Fujii (藤井麻輝) from SOFT BALLET
- Uwa no Sora (うわのそら) (1994) with the participation of INORAN from Luna Sea and Ryouichi Endou (遠藤遼一) from SOFT BALLET
- Never mind the distortion (1994) (remix album)
- Gentle & Elegance (1996)
- Never mind the distortion II (1997) (remix album)
- Never mind the distortions (2003) (remix album)

Compilation Album

- Switch Complete 1986-1987 (2001)

Videos

- Never mind the distortion (1994)
