= Katalyst (DJ) =

Australian DJ and producer

- Also known as: Katalyst
- Born: Ashley Anderson
- Origin: Sydney, Australia
- Genres: Hip-hop, soul
- Years active: 1998–present
- Labels: Stones Throw; Invada; BBE; Universal Music
- Website: Official website

Katalyst (real name Ashley Anderson) is an Australian DJ and producer. He won awards at the 2002 Australian Dance Music Awards for Best Album and Best Producer.

== History ==
=== 1998–2000: Moonrock ===
Anderson initially recorded under the name Moonrock with fellow producer Michael Wright (aka Illpickl). Moonrock released a self-titled album in 1998, and went on to contribute tracks to the internationally renowned Cafe Del Mar compilation albums (Volume 6 (1999) and The Best Of (2003)).

=== 2001–2011: Katalyst ===
As Katalyst, he had his first solo release with a track on the Dope on Plastic compilation in 2001. That year also saw him form experimental record label, Invada Records, together with Portishead's Geoff Barrow. Invada Records' has released records from acts like Amusement Parks on Fire, Flow Dynamics, RuC.L, Koolism and Space Invadas.

May 2002 saw the release of the Katalyst's debut album Manipulating Agent, the first release for Invada Records. The album was nominated at the 2002 ARIA Awards for ARIA Award for Best Dance Release and received Best Producer and Best Album at the 2002 Australian Dance Music Awards. In late 2002 Katalyst enlisted a number of Australian and UK producers to remix tracks from his album, the result was the remix album Agent Manipulated, released in April 2003.

Katalyst's next release, Katalyst Presents: Dusted – Essential Mix Of Rare Groove & Hip Hop Joints was released in March 2005. The album is a mix of rare groove and hip-hop songs, the two CD compilation features Anderson's favourite artists (including Public Enemy, Run DMC, A Tribe Called Quest, Nina Simone, Portishead and Sérgio Mendes) together with a Katalyst track, "Let The Music Talk", featuring RuCL.

In August 2007 Katalyst released his second studio album What's Happening, enlisting guest vocalists from the US, the UK and Australia (J-Live, Stephanie McKay, Steve Spacek, Supernatural, Mat McHugh (The Beautiful Girls), Adalita (Magic Dirt), Ru C.L, Hau (Koolism). The album was nominated for Triple J's J Award and 'Best Urban Release' at the 2008 ARIA awards

In 2009 he began working on a project with Steve Spacek under the name Space Invadas. An album, Soul-Fi, was released in March 2010. The album was nominated for an ARIA Award for Best Urban Release.

His third solo album in the Katalyst trilogy was entitled Deep Impressions and was released in 2011. Of the title and creative method behind his third release, Katalyst says "Writing music for me is a continual process so when it came time to put the third Katalyst album together I looked at the songs I had written and recorded for the new release. As a body of work it was clear that many styles of music have made a deep impression on me as a producer. Hence the name of my album." This album was also met with critical acclaim. It was nominated for an ARIA Award in 2012 for Best Urban Album.

=== 2012–present: International move ===
2012 has seen Katalyst making big moves internationally, being signed to legendary Californian label Stones Throw Records with his latest release Quakers. A collaboration with Geoff Barrow, Quakers is a hip-hop collective currently boasting 35 members which orbits around a core of three producers: Katalyst, Fuzzface and 7-Stu-7. Fuzzface is better known as Portishead's founder and producer Geoff Barrow. 7-Stu-7 is Portishead's engineer and in-house producer at Invada Records in the UK. Some of the 32 MCs on the record include Dead Prez, Guilty Simpson, Aloe Blacc, Phat Kat, Prince Po and Booty Brown to name just a handful.

Quakers album has been hailed by many as an instant classic, with reviews like 91/100 on Okay Player. The album has been listed as No. 41 in Amazon UK's top 100 albums of 2012. Also iTunes UK named it Best New Hip Hop Album of the Year and Best New Hip Hop Artist 2012. It made Gilles Peterson's BBC Radio Best of 2012.

Katalyst has produced/remixed for artists, including Stephanie McKay, Jack Johnson, Gift of Gab, Ugly Duckling, Vassy, King Kapisi and The Beautiful Girls.

He has toured with/supported live with The Roots, Jurassic 5, Ben Harper, DJ Shadow, Jack Johnson, DJ Premier, Guru, Mix Master Mike, Sharon Jones & The Dap-Kings and The Black Eyed Peas.

== Discography ==
=== Studio albums ===
List of studio albums, with selected details and chart positions
Title	Album details	Peak chart positions
Title	Album details	AUS
Moonrock (as Moonrock)	Released: 1998; Label: Creative Vibes (CVCD 011); Formats: CD	—
Manipulating Agent	Released: May 2002; Label: Invada (INVCD010); Formats: CD, LP	98
What's Happening	Released: August 2007; Label: Invada (INVCD031); Formats: CD, LP	72
Deep Impressions	Released: September 2011; Label: Invada (INVCD037); Formats: CD, digital	—

=== Compilation and remix albums ===
List of compilation and remix albums, with selected details
Title	Details
Agent Manipulated	Released: April 2003; Label: Invada (INVCD011); Formats: CD, LP
Katalyst Presents: Dusted	Released: March 2005; Label: Invada, Universal Music Australia (9827171); Formats: 2×CD

== Awards and nominations ==
=== AIR Awards ===
The Australian Independent Record Awards (commonly known informally as AIR Awards) is an annual awards night to recognise, promote and celebrate the success of Australia's Independent Music sector.

Year	Nominee / work	Award	Result
2008	What's Happening	Best Independent Hip Hop Album	Nominated
2012	The Quickening	Best Independent Hip Hop/Urban Album	Nominated

=== ARIA Music Awards ===
The ARIA Music Awards is an annual awards ceremony held by the Australian Recording Industry Association.

Year	Nominee / work	Award	Result
2002	Manipulating Agent	Best Dance Release	Nominated
2008	What's Happening	Best Urban Release	Nominated
2010	Soul-Fi (as Space Invadas)	Best Urban Album	Nominated
2012	Deep Impressions	Best Urban Album	Nominated

=== Australian Dance Music Awards ===
Year	Nominee / work	Award	Result
2002	Manipulating Agent	Best Album	Won
2002	'Katalyst	Best Producer	Won

=== J Award ===
The J Awards are an annual series of Australian music awards that were established by the Australian Broadcasting Corporation's youth-focused radio station Triple J. They commenced in 2005.

Year	Nominee / work	Award	Result
2007	What's Happening	Australian Album of the Year	Nominated
