= Under the Sun (Mark Pritchard album) =

Studio album by Mark Pritchard
- Released: 13 May 2016
- Genre: Electronic
- Length: 67:18
- Label: Warp
- Producer: Mark Pritchard

Mark Pritchard chronology
93 Million Miles by Africa Hitech (2011)	Under the Sun (2016)	The Four Worlds (2018)

Under the Sun is a studio album by Mark Pritchard, released on Warp Records on 13 May 2016. It includes vocal appearances from Thom Yorke, Linda Perhacs, Bibio, and Beans. The follow-up Under the Sun: Expanded Vol. 1 was released on Warp in 2016.

== Track listing ==
Under the Sun track listing
No.	Title	Writer(s)	Length
1.	"?"		6:03
2.	"Give It Your Choir" (featuring Bibio)	Pritchard, Bibio	4:25
3.	"Infrared"		2:40
4.	"Falling"		3:16
5.	"Beautiful People" (featuring Thom Yorke)	Pritchard, Yorke	6:02
6.	"Where Do They Go, the Butterflies"		3:25
7.	"Sad Alron"		2:36
8.	"You Wash My Soul" (featuring Linda Perhacs; backing vocals by Kirsty Hawkshaw)		5:29
9.	"Cycles of 9" (cello by Peter Hollo)		4:00
10.	"Hi Red"		1:27
11.	"EMS"		8:19
12.	"The Blinds Cage" (featuring Beans)	Pritchard, Beans	5:02
13.	"Dawn of the North"		1:34
14.	"Khufu"		3:22
15.	"Rebel Angels"		3:08
16.	"Under the Sun"		6:30
Total length:			67:18
