= This Picture (band) =

- Origin: Cheltenham, England
- Genres: Alternative rock
- Years active: 1989–1995
- Labels: RCA/Dedicated Records, Rough Trade
- Past members: Symon Bye; Duncan Forrester; Robert Forrester; Austen Rowley; Steve Hughes

This Picture were a UK alternative rock band that was formed in 1989 in Cheltenham, England and broke up in 1995, after releasing two albums.

== History ==
The band consisted of lead singer Symon Bye, Duncan Forrester (drums), Robert Forrester (guitar), and Austen Rowley, who replaced original bass player Steve Hughes in 1991. The band released two albums, the Kevin Moloney-produced A Violent Impression (1991) and City of Sin (1994), both issued by RCA Records in the U.S. and Dedicated Records in the UK.

Tom Demalon drew comparisons to U2 and Hothouse Flowers in his review of the album Violent Impression. Demalon gave the album 2 stars in the review for AllMusic. In an interview for the online music magazine Perfect Sound Forever, Forrester described the thinking behind the change of bass player and also talks about the troubled second album and eventual band split.

Bye and Duncan Forrester kept in touch and continued to write and record, eventually signing a deal with EMI Publishing. Symon was also a member of a band called 'd tone & Me' and four of his songs are featured in a movie directed by E D Maytum, called Blind (2007).

Robert and Duncan Forrester started a new band with Steve Whitfield (ex Belljar) called 'Western Electric Sound System' is writing and recording material.

== Discography ==
=== Albums ===
- A Violent Impression (Dedicated/RCA 1991)
- City of Sin (Dedicated/RCA 1994)

=== Singles ===
- "Naked Rain" (33⅓ EP, Rough Trade, 1989 – RTT237)
- "Breathe Deeply Now" (Dedicated, 1991) US Billboard Modern Rock No. 24 (charted in 1992)
- "Naked Rain" (Dedicated, 1991) US Billboard Modern Rock No. 10
- "Stronger Than Life Itself" (Dedicated, 1991)
- "The Great Tree" (Dedicated, 1991)
- "With You I Can Never Win" (Dedicated, 1991)
- "Step Up" (Dedicated, 1992)
- "Highrise" (Dedicated, 1993)
- Acoustic Versions EP (Dedicated, 1994)
- "Hands On My Soul" (Dedicated, 1994) UK No. 98
- "Heart Of Another Man" (Dedicated, 1994)
