= Island Blue Records =

- Country of origin: United Kingdom
- Location: London

Island Blue Records was a record label based in London. Its notable releases included Under Your Sky (2000), the debut album for Underwolves, and the 2001 album Curvatia by Spacek.

== See also ==
- List of record labels
