= Mulu (band) =

British trip hop duo

Mulu were a British trip hop duo of the late 1990s, who released one album, Smiles Like a Shark, on 4 August 1997. The duo consisted of singer Laura Campbell, and producer Alan Edmunds, who had worked as a remixer for Utah Saints, Fluke, Björk, Heaven 17, Elbow, the Kills, Moloko, Spandau Ballet, OMD, and Shirley Bassey.

The album spawned three singles: "Filmstar", "Pussycat" and "Desire". "Pussycat" was named Record of the Week on Mark and Lard's BBC Radio One show, and reached #50 on the UK Singles Chart. The video for "Pussycat" starred actor Paul Reynolds.
