= Stephanie McKay =

American singer-songwriter

- Born: Stephanie McKay
- Origin: The Bronx, New York
- Genres: Soul; funk; reggae; pop; hip hop; rock
- Occupation: Singer-songwriter
- Labels: Polydor Records (2003); Astralwerks (2005); Muthas Of Invention (2008)
- Website: stephaniemckay.com

Stephanie McKay is an American soul singer-songwriter from the Bronx, New York. Her music incorporates elements of soul, funk, rock, and hip-hop. With a career spanning over 20 years, McKay has collaborated with a variety of artists, including Anthony Hamilton, DJ Spinna, Toshi Reagon and Big Lovely, Roy Hargrove, Jacques Schwarz-Bart, Katalyst, Mos Def, Talib Kweli, Tricky, Carl Hancock Rux and Amp Fiddler, among others. She has released two solo albums, McKay (2003) and Tell It Like It Is (2008), as well as a self-titled EP, Stephanie McKay (2006). Additionally, she has toured internationally as a solo artist and previously played guitar in Kelis' band and recorded with the Brooklyn Funk Essentials.

== Early life ==
Stephanie McKay was born in New York City and raised in the Bronx. During her early years, she was a member of school choirs and music groups at Truman High School before joining the Alvin Ailey School. McKay then moved on to the University of the Arts in Philadelphia where she graduated with a Bachelor in Fine Arts in modern dance in 1993.

== Early music career ==
McKay began attending singing auditions following a knee injury, which had ended her dance aspirations. At one of these auditions, producer Kashif hired her on the spot for a new girl group called "The Promise". The group went on to be signed by Clive Davis at Arista Records. It was during this period that McKay began writing songs. She also began to study singing under Don Lawrence and drums under Kenwood Dennard.

== Solo career ==
While pursuing her professional music aspirations in New York, McKay continued to dance with several modern dance companies, including Jane Comfort, Amy Pivar, and Urban Bush Women, as well as sung her songs in New York City clubs. She also began to gain more work experience as a session vocalist for various artists, including Carl Hancock Rux. While on tour with Kelis in England, Stephanie met Geoff Barrow through Rux.

=== First album: McKay ===
McKay and Barrow collaborated on the album McKay, which included original compositions by Stephanie, along with producers Tim Saul and Geoff Barrow. Barrow is credited in the album's sleeve notes as "Fuzzface". The album also features two songs co-penned by Barrow and Rux and additional instrumentation by other notable, Bristol-based musicians in Adrian Utley and John Baggott. The LP also contains the closing track "Echo", a Sweet Honey in the Rock cover version, penned by the acclaimed social activist, Bernice Johnson Reagon.

The album received critical acclaim, with The Guardian saying it was "resurrecting the passion and pride of politically conscious and eternally lovelorn ladies of late-1960s, early 1970s soul, McKay shines bright." MOJO described McKay as "extraordinarily eclectic" and her album as "a coherent artistic statement" and "worth investigating."

McKay went on to play at the WOMAD, Bristol and the Jazz Cafe in England and her music received international acclaim and rotation on MTV. The album McKay was released in Europe on (Go Beat/Polydor/Universal). Stephanie was soon signed by American company Astralwerks . In an attempt to introduce McKay to the American market, the label released a five song EP in September 2006 with two new songs from forthcoming album, two older songs from McKay, and a remix by DJ Spinna of "Tell It Like It Is". Additionally, she was featured on US funk musician Amp Fiddler's album release Afro Strut.

=== Second album: Tell It Like It Is ===
McKay's second album Tell It Like It Is was later released independently on Pias/Muthas of Invention. McKay went on to play at the Glastonbury Festival in 2009, North Sea Jazz Festival, and Spoleto in France.

=== Additional works ===
After the death of her mother in 2008 and the birth of her son in 2009, McKay took a hiatus and concentrated on motherhood instead of touring. She continued to release singles with longtime collaborator DJ Katalyst from Australia with the single "Day into Night" and "You Can't Save Me."

In January 2013, she sang along Jimmy Cliff in Volkswagen's "Get Happy" commercial for the 2013 Super Bowl.

=== Collaboration with Jacques Schwarz-Bart ===
She is married to jazz tenor saxophonist Jacques Schwarz-Bart. The couple have collaborated musically with the album Rise Above (Dreyfus), an album released by her husband which contained the single "Feel So Free." The album's song " Forget Regret" has been covered by Roy Hargrove. "Friend and Lover," a composition McKay and Schwarz-Bart wrote together for jazz guitarist Yosuke Onuma (Sony Japan), was also recorded by EMILY (jazz pianist and singer) and TOKU (trumpeter and singer) for Sony.

== Music ==
McKay's musical style has been described as "Motown meets midnight Marauder". Her songs fuse powerful urban poetics with sonic sound waves that includes elements of hip-hop, rock, pop, soul.

McKay says her music is influenced by her childhood in New York and the classic soul singers of the sixties and inventiveness of popular soul bands from the seventies.

"I have a brother who is eight years older than me, who was always playing 70's soul and funk music like Earth, Wind And Fire and the Ohio Players, while my mom was in the other room listening to Al Green and Barry White. On my own though, I was a fan of the classic pop station WABC, where I first discovered artists like Michael Jackson and Jim Croce."

=== Albums ===
- McKay (2003)
- Stephanie McKay EP (2006)
- Tell It Like It Is (2008)

=== Singles/EPs ===
- Tell him
- Take me Over
- Tell it like it is
- Stephanie McKay EP (2006)
- Jackson Avenue (2008)
- Song in my Heart (2018)
- Phenomenon (2022)

== Personal life ==
Stephanie McKay is married to saxophonist Jacques Schwarz-Bart. The two met at a concert they were both performing in. This led them to collaborate on the Tell Me More album, which was inspired by their personal and musical relationship. For example, Schwarz-Bart says the idea for "Rainbow," one of the songs in the album, was an idea he had when he was crossing the Brooklyn Bridge to meet up with McKay. "I wanted it to be poetic," he says, "but not just a love song."
