= Mark Pritchard (musician) =

English electronic musician (born 1971)

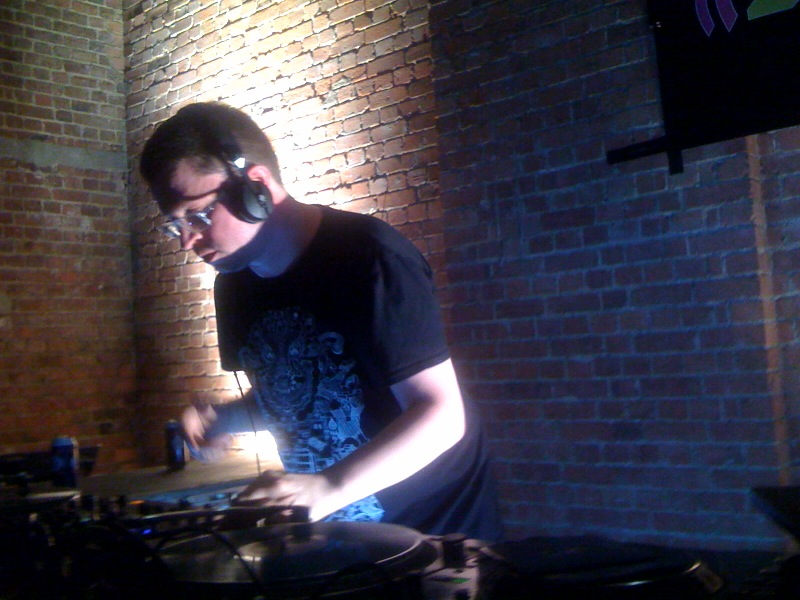

Background information
- Also known as: Harmonic 313; Reload; Troubleman; Link; Harmonic 33; N.Y. Connection; MP; Roberto Edwardo Turner (The Returner); M. Meechum; William Parrot
- Born: Mark Pritchard; 15 April 1971 (age 55); Crewkerne, Somerset, England
- Genres: Breakbeat; house; hip hop; techno; jungle, ambient; grime; drum and bass
- Occupations: Producer; DJ; remixer
- Instrument: Various
- Years active: 1991–present
- Labels: Warp; Hyperdub; Sonar Kollektiv; Dedicated; Planet Mu; Big Dada
- Member of: Global Communication; Africa Hitech
- Formerly of: Shaft
- Website: Mark Pritchard on Bandcamp

Mark Pritchard (born 15 April 1971) is an English electronic musician, currently signed to Warp. He has produced a large discography with a constant change of styles and genres, in both solo work under various aliases, and collaborations.

Pritchard and Tom Middleton formed a record label, Evolution, in 1991. The label was eventually discontinued. Throughout the 1990s, Pritchard and Middleton worked together under the names Global Communication, Jedi Knights, Secret Ingredients, Link & E621, Reload, and the Chameleon. In the late 1990s, he started collaborating with Dave Brinkworth spawning the projects Use of Weapons and Harmonic 33. His other collaborations include Series 7 with Stephen Horne, Shaft with Adrian Hughes, Vertigo with Danny Breaks, the 28 East Boyz with Kevin Hann, Chaos & Julia Set with Dominic Fripp, Mystic Institute with Paul Kent, Pulusha with Kirsty Hawkshaw, Pritch & Trim with Trim and Africa Hitech with Steve Spacek. In 2025, Pritchard released an album with Thom Yorke, Tall Tales.

Pritchard has recorded under aliases including Reload, Link, Harmonic 313, Troubleman, NY Connection, and Roberto Edwardo Turner (The Returner). In June 2013, it was announced that he would be retiring his various aliases and using solely his birth name for future releases.

== Early life ==
Mark Pritchard was born in Yeovil in Somerset, England in 1971. From an early age he listened to a wide range of musical styles, and says when he was 5 his mother would buy him a new 7" record every week.

== Music career ==
After spending his school years listening to ska, 2-tone, indie and rock, he eventually became involved in club music, specifically Detroit techno and Chicago house. In the clubs of Taunton he came into contact with fellow West Country residents Tom Middleton and Richard D. James. Middleton would become frequent collaborator and James would eventually be Pritchard's label-mate on Warp.

Pritchard and Middleton formed a record label, Evolution (named after one of Carl Craig's tracks), in 1991. The label played host to experimental electronica and dance music, including early releases from Matthew Herbert and Danny Breaks, but was eventually discontinued.

Pritchard produces music in a wide range of genres, including hip hop, techno, jungle, ambient, grime and drum and bass. FACT magazine claims across all this eclecticism, there are some consistent themes, stating "He's not a minimalist, for one: regardless of genre, his productions are rich, gestural, and almost always interested in surface dazzle" and "his output tends also towards the instantly accessible".

In June 2013, it was announced that he would be retiring his various aliases and using solely his birth name for future releases, with which, Pritchard released a trio of EPs on Warp, all a medley of footwork, jungle and bass-heavy dance-floor orientated electronics. A full-length LP, Under the Sun was released in 2016, and its companion album The Four Worlds in 2018, both on Warp; deeply atmospheric and richly impressionistic, hearkening back to Pritchard's work as Global Communication, with vocals from Thom Yorke, Linda Perhacs, Bibio, and Beans.

== Solo projects ==
=== Link ===
The Link material goes back to 1992's The First Link EP, and is predominantly techno, often using drum breaks in favour of classic 808 and 909 drum sounds. There were two EP's released solo as Link, these being The First Link EP on Evolution and The Augur on Symbiotic. The Link alias also spawned Link & E621, which referred to Pritchard and Tom Middleton and was used for the 1995 release Antacid.

=== N.Y. Connection ===
This New York City house music project was inspired by Strictly Rhythm's early 1990s releases, particularly those of DJ Pierre. The project yielded five singles, two of which were produced in conjunction with Kevin Hann of 28 East Boyz.

=== Troubleman ===
The Troubleman material was released through Far Out Recordings from 2001 to 2005. The releases were generally mid-tempo, electro and funk with Brazilian influences. Pritchard has cited Kenny "Dope" Gonzalez as an influence for the project. The project yielded six singles/EPs and two albums.

=== Reload ===
The Reload alias was first used in 1991 and was responsible for some of Pritchard's more industrial output. Under this alias, several EPs and remixes were produced, and the 1993 album A Collection of Short Stories.

=== Harmonic 313 ===
Pritchard has released under this alias through Warp since 2008. Under it he released four EPs/singles and one full length, When Machines Exceed Human Intelligence. He created the moniker to link with his Harmonic 33 project whilst acknowledging the Detroit influence (313 being the Detroit area code) heard in its sound.

=== Mark Pritchard ===
Pritchard first released solo material under his birth name with 2009's ? / The Hologram on Ho-Hum Records. Following releases on Hyperdub and Deep Medi Musik, he is currently signed to Warp, through which he released a trilogy of EP's exploring styles such as footwork and jungle in 2013, followed by two ambient companion albums Under the Sun in 2016 and The Four Worlds in 2018.

== Collaborative projects ==
=== Global Communication ===
Conceived in the early 1990s, Global Communication was another collaborative project of Pritchard and Tom Middleton, and its output was predominantly ambient. Most of the material was released on Dedicated Records and comprises eight singles/EPs and two albums, including Pentamerous Metamorphosis, a reworking of the Chapterhouse album Blood Music. They also released the album 76:14 (named after its duration) which The Guardian featured in their 1,000 Albums to Hear Before You Die list, describing it as an "unfathomably beautiful out-of-time masterpiece."

=== Reload & E621 ===
The Reload & E621 moniker was used for Reload releases that featured Tom Middleton. E621 (the E number for Monosodium glutamate) also denoted the addition of Middleton in the Link & E621 project.

=== 28 East Boyz ===
This was the pairing of Pritchard and his school friend, Kevin Hann. For contractual reasons, Pritchard could not use his real name for the credits, so he and his manager came up with the nom de plume William Parrot based on his childhood pets. The project yielded two singles.

=== Jedi Knights ===
A project with Tom Middleton, Jedi Knights first appeared remixing the Link & E621 track Antacid in 1995. Pritchard said the project in part came about as a reaction to what they saw as a lack of funk and humour in the club scene, and cites P-Funk and electro as musical influences.

=== Use of Weapons ===
A project with Dave Brinkworth, Drum and Bass and Jungle label, Droppin' Science. The pair released three singles under this alias from 1998 to 2001.

=== Vertigo ===
Pritchard collaborated with Danny Breaks under this alias, releasing the 2000 single The Drained / Migraine.

=== Chaos & Julia Set ===
This was the collaborative project of Pritchard and Dominic Fripp, a school friend of Pritchard's who wrote the short stories featured on the Reload album. They released three singles between 1993 and 1997.

=== Pulusha ===
This was a predominantly ambient project with Opus III vocalist Kirsty Hawkshaw, and resulted in the 1997 release Isolation. Pritchard went on to produce Hawkshaw's debut album with Dave Brinkworth, and in 2004, Pritchard contributed to Hawkshaw's Ambient Vocals.

=== Shaft ===
Shaft was originally Pritchard, Kevin Hann and Adrian Hughes. The project spawned the Pritchard-penned UK top 10 single "Roobarb and Custard," which sampled the cartoon of the same name. The success of the single meant Pritchard could afford to buy some equipment and ultimately allowed him to focus on making music full-time from then on. A UK No. 61 chart hit followed in "Monkey" in 1992. The project produced four singles/EPs.

=== Harmonic 33 ===
This was a collaborative project with Dave Brinkworth that started in 1998. It yielded five singles/EPs, and two albums; Extraordinary People and Music For Film, Television & Radio Volume One. The name came from a book about extraterrestrial beings using planetary harmonic frequencies to navigate space. Stylistically, the releases explored "...exotica, '60s/'70s library music, sci-fi, ...hip-hop".

=== Africa Hitech ===
This was a project collaborative project with Steve Spacek, who came up with the name after the pair discussed how African and Jamaican migrants had influenced UK club music. The duo released exclusively through Warp and produced four singles/EPs and the album 93 Million Miles

=== Pritch & Trim ===
Pritchard and grime MC Trim teamed up for the Planet Mu single Stereotype in 2011.

=== Mark Pritchard and Wiley ===
Pritchard collaborated with Wiley on the 2012 single "Scar/Moneyman," released by Ninja Tune. The 12" included a remix of "Money Man" under the Harmonic 313 alias.

=== Tall Tales (2025) ===
Pritchard collaborated again with the singer Thom Yorke to create the album Tall Tales, released through Warp Records on 9 May 2025. The project began during the COVID-19 lockdowns, when Pritchard sent Yorke a large number of MP3s. The first single, "Back in the Game", was released on 13 February, the second, "This Conversation Is Missing Your Voice", on 11 March, the third, "Gangsters", on 9 April, and the fourth and final, "The Spirit", on 8 May. The singles were accompanied by videos created by Jonathan Zawada.

== Discography ==
=== By Pritchard ===
==== Albums ====
- A Collection of Short Stories by Reload (Infonet, 1993)
- 76:14 by Global Communication (Dedicated, 1994)
- New School Science by Jedi Knights (Evolution, 1996)
- Extraordinary People by Harmonic 33 (Alphabet Zoo, 2002)
- Time Out of Mind as Troubleman (Far Out, 2004)
- Music for Film, Television & Radio Volume One as Harmonic 33 (Warp, 2005)
- When Machines Exceed Human Intelligence as Harmonic 313 (Warp, 2008)
- 93 Million Miles by Africa Hitech (Warp, 2011)
- Under the Sun (Warp, 2016)
- Under the Sun: Expanded Vol. 1 (Warp, 2016)
- The Four Worlds (Warp, 2018)
- Tall Tales (with Thom Yorke; Warp, 2025)

==== Singles and EPs ====
- The Way/The Deep by Global Communication (Dedicated, 1996)
- The First Link EP by Link (Evolution, 1992)
  - Remaster/reissue, 2007
- The Augur EP by Link (1993)
  - Remaster/reissue, 2007
- Dirtbox as Harmonic 313 (Warp, 2008) – EP
- Elephant Dub / Heavy as Stone (Deep Medi Musik, 2010)
- Stereotype with Trim (Planet Mu, 2011)
- Scar with Wiley (Big Dada, 2012)
- Lock Off (Warp, 2013) – EP
- Ghosts (Warp, 2013) – EP
- MP Productions – EP 1 (Warp, 2020)
- Back in the Game with Thom Yorke (Warp, 2025)
- This Conversation is Missing Your Voice with Thom Yorke (Warp, 2025)
- Gangsters with Thom Yorke (Warp, 2025)
- The Spirit with Thom Yorke (Warp, 2025)

=== Remixes ===
- "On" by Aphex Twin (Reload Remix) (Warp, 1993)
- "Home" by Depeche Mode (Jedi Knights Remix (Drowning in Time)) (Mute, 1997)
- "Know My Name" by Nightmares on Wax (Mark Pritchard Remix) (Warp, 2002)
- "Stronger Than Me" by Amy Winehouse (Harmonic 33 Remix) (Island, 2003)
- "Bloom" by Radiohead, Mark Pritchard RMX and Harmonic 313 RMX. Included on 12" and compiled on TKOL RMX 1234567 (Ticker Tape; XL, 2011)
- "Stay the Same" by Bonobo (Mark Pritchard Remix) (Ninja Tune, 2012)
- "Lately" by Massive Attack (Mark Pritchard Remix) (unreleased, 2013)
- ”I Know You Can Feel It” (Mark Pritchard Remix) by Nine Inch Nails (2026)
