= Spacek (band) =

British electronic music band

Spacek Sound System
- Origin: London, England
- Genres: Electronica, trip hop, R&B, broken beat, neo soul
- Years active: 1996–present
- Labels: Island Blue; Studio !K7; Sound In color
- Website: Official Myspace page

Spacek (also known as Spacek Sound System) is a British electronic music band. Its members are Steve Spacek (Real name Steve White), Ed Spacek, and Morgan Spacek. The group released its debut album, Curvatia in 2001, followed by 2003's Vintage Hi-Tech. Although primarily performing electronic music, the group also fuses elements of R&B, hip hop, trip hop, broken beat and soul into its anomalistic soundbed. Steve Spacek is brother to UK drum and bass artist dBridge.

== Biography ==
=== 1996–2001 ===
The trio was formed in the mid-1990s by bassist, vocalist, and songwriter, Steve White but initially was a 5-piece that included Francis Hylton (Now in Incognito) and keyboardist Steve Morgan. Through a mutual friend, White was introduced to guitarist Edmund Cavill and with manager Jason Knight approached drummer, Morgan Zarate to the lineup to form Spacek. All three members subsequently adopted Spacek as their surnames.

By 1998, the group had obtained a record deal with British label Island Blue, and began recording in Knight's Clapham-based studio. Their first release was "Eve", which received a great underground buzz in late 1999. The hypnotic, bass-trembling song was ambiguous in nature; a feature which would become a stylistic trademark for the group. The band caught the attention of acclaimed rapper Mos Def, who subsequently contributed a verse to a re-edit of the song and the band signed an American deal with his Goodtree label (MCA/Universal). "Eve" was re-released in 2000, with a remix by producer J Dilla, and a guest appearance from Frank-N-Dank.

After an extended recording period, the group finally premiered their debut album, 2001's Curvatia, to great critical acclaim, and comparisons to artists such as Massive Attack and D'Angelo. Curvatia displayed the group's complex and challenging sensibilities and established them as a promising new talent in the British alternative music scene, but a change in the Island Records hierarchy meant that they were no longer a priority and it was not a strong seller. The second single was "Getaway" with "How Do I Move?" as its B-side.

=== 2002–2004 ===
The next two years saw the group go through some label changes as they began recording their follow up to Curvatia. The group left Island Blue Records and were picked up by Studio !K7 records. 2003's Vintage Hi-Tech saw the group further exploring the more extreme aspects of Curvatia, such as the minimal use of standard song structures, more experimentation with lead singer White's vocals, and an even more stripped down, and disjointed instrumental sound. The album's first single was "Motion Control", followed by "Starz". Like its predecessor, Vintage Hi-Tech was embraced by critics, who called it "a downtempo musical masterpiece that draws no comparison". Style magazine even went as far as to call them "the Radiohead of soul".

=== 2005–present ===
In 2005, lead vocalist, White, launched a solo career as Steve Spacek, and began recording Spaceshift, after signing with Los Angeles-based label Sound In Color. The album's lead single "Dollar", produced by J Dilla, became an unexpected moderate hit and was particularly popular in the club and among DJs. The song contained a sample of the Billy Paul recording "Let the Dollar Circulate", and dealt with the pros and cons of living with or without money. Notable producer, and former Digable Planets member, King Britt, described the song as "what Curtis Mayfield would be doing today!" Spaceshift was also popular among mainstream critics, with Rolling Stone magazine noting that Spacek "...gives new meaning to the phrase space funk", and Fader magazine calling the group "the most futuristic soul group of our modern age".

The group, fronted by White, continues to tour and gig all over the world. Its members now live in Los Angeles, Munich, and Sydney. In 2007, White appeared as a lecturer at the Red Bull Music Academy and also made a guest appearance on Katalyst's album What's Happening. Spacek also contributed vocals to Mark Pritchard's Harmonic 313 project, on the 2008 album When Machines Exceed Human Intelligence. As of late 2009, White is working on a new project with Katalyst under the name "Space Invadas".

Morgan Spacek has also continued to produce music both as Morgan Spacek and Morgan Zarate, working with artists as diverse as Dizzee Rascal, Raphael Saadiq, Eska and Ghostface Killah.

== Australia ==
Steve Spacek's entry to Australia via Sydney Airport, on a tourist visa, to see his 13-week-old son, featured in an episode of the fly-on-the-wall television documentary Border Security: Australia's Front Line. Despite some initial concerns, he was allowed to enter the country.

== Discography ==
=== Albums ===
As Spacek

- Curvatia (2001, Island Blue)
- Vintage Hi-Tech (2003, Studio !K7)

As Steve Spacek

- Spaceshift (2005, Sound In Color)
- Natural Sci-Fi (2018, Eglo Records)

=== Singles ===
As Spacek

- "Eve" (1999/2000, Island Blue)
- "Getaway" b/w "How Do I Move?" (2001, Island Blue)
- "Motion Control" (2003, Studio !K7)
- "Starz (Remix)" (2004, Studio !K7)
- "2Pac – Do for Love (Spacek Remix)" (2006, no label listed)

As Steve Spacek

- "Dollar" (2005, Sound In Color)
- "Baby Baby" (2006, Jazzy Sport)
- "I Wanna Piece Of Ur Luv" (2006, Jazzy Sport)
- "How You Gonna Feel" (Commix feat. Steve Spacek)
- Katalyst – The Popcorns (feat. Bootie Brown & Steve Spacek)

As Beat Spacek

- "Ring Di Alarm" (2017, on Bandcamp, Profile – S P A)
