= Dedicated Records =

British record label

Dedicated
- Founded: 1990
- Founder: Doug D'Arcy and BMG group
- Genre: Neo-psychedelia; Alternative rock Indie music
- Country of origin: United Kingdom
- Location: London, England

Dedicated was a British independent record label that released music between 1990 and 1998 by Spiritualized, Spacemen 3, Global Communication, Beth Orton (in the U.S.), Chapterhouse, Cranes and others. It was based in London and founded by Doug D'Arcy.

Dedicated were bought by Arista Records who were in turn bought by Sony Music Entertainment.

== History ==
Dedicated Records was founded by Doug D'Arcy after leaving Chrysalis Records where he had been managing director, later president and director of the Chrysalis Group. It was a joint venture with BMG group (and was eventually amalgamated into the main Group via Deconstruction Records). Dedicated Records signed Spacemen 3 from Fire Records (UK), who split up after signing, therefore Dedicated inherited offshoot band Spiritualized.

Eventually, in the US, Dedicated Artists were transferred to Arista Records, although by that point in time the only groups it represented were Spiritualized and Beth Orton (U.S. only).

== Artists ==
- 30 Amp Fuse
- Balloon
- Beth Orton (in the U.S.)
- Butterfly Child
- Cardinal
- Catwalk
- Chapterhouse
- Comet
- Cranes
- dBh
- The Family Cat
- Global Communication
- Hum
- Linoleum
- Long River Train
- Muler
- Mulu
- Other People's Money
- Reverberation
- Shere Khan
- Silkscreen
- Skeleton Key
- Sonus
- Spacemen 3
- Spiritualized
- Synergy
- This Picture
- Velo-Deluxe
