= Tom Middleton =

British electronic recording artist and DJ

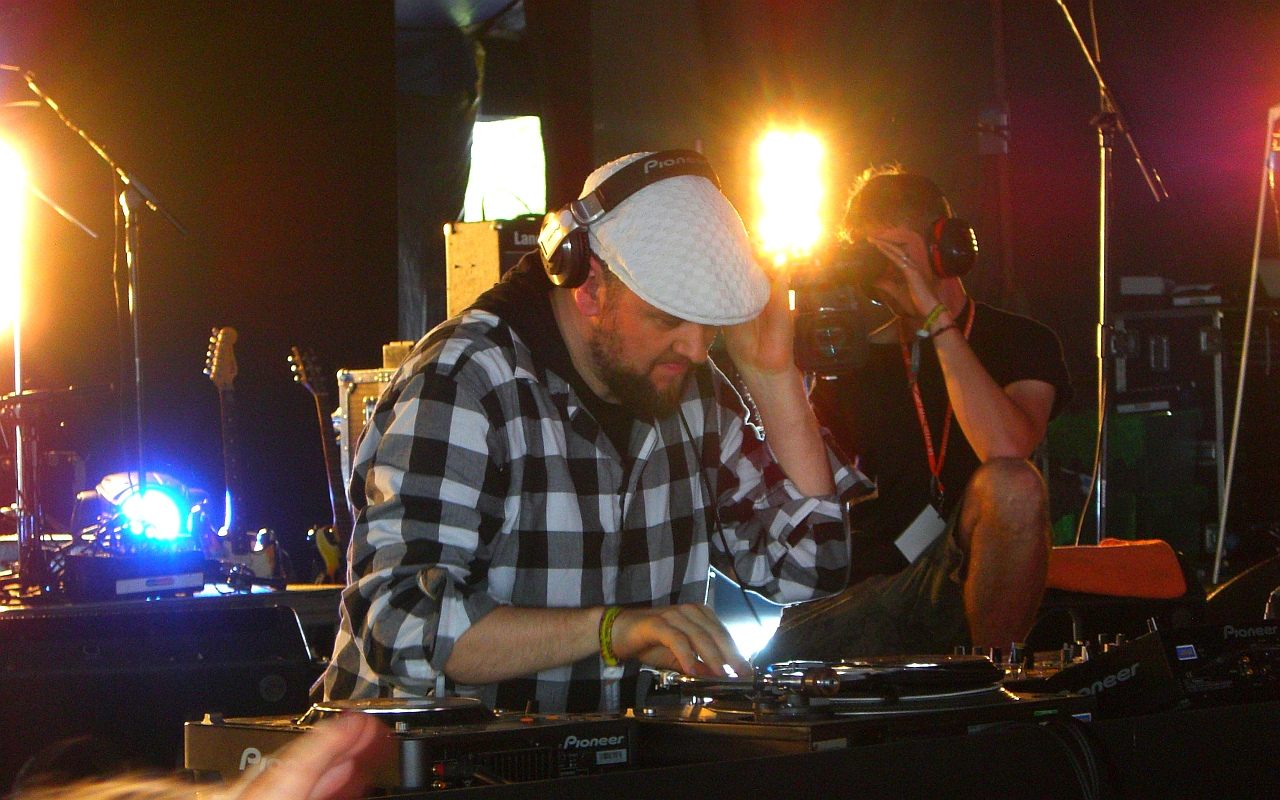
- Tom Middleton at Glastonbury Festival 2009

Background information
- Also known as: Schizophrenia
- Born: 18 August 1971 (age 55); London, England
- Genres: Big beat; electronic; trip hop; house; ambient; drum and bass
- Occupations: Sound designer, musician, composer, music producer, sleep coach, disc jockey remixer, graphic designer
- Years active: Early 1990s–present

Tom Middleton (born 18 August 1971) is a British electronic recording artist, sound designer, composer, music producer, remixer and DJ. His solo albums include Lifetracks (2007), Glasstracks (2011) and Sleep Better (2018). Middleton and Mark Pritchard have collaborated under various names including Global Communication.

== Biography ==
A classically trained pianist and cellist, Middleton worked in the early 1990s with Richard D. James (with whom he shares the same birthdate), co-producing "En-Trance to Exit" on the Analogue Bubblebath EP for Mighty Force Records. This was followed by his first solo outing, "My Splendid Idea", under the name Schizophrenia for the same label. Middleton has cited personal influences including Prince, U2, the Human League, OMD and Depeche Mode, while noting a "love of 80's synth music".

Soon after, he teamed up with Mark Pritchard. The pair recorded under a host of pseudonyms, including Reload (featuring experimental techno and ambient music), Global Communication (primarily ambient), and Jedi Knights (electro funk and house music), and the aliases Chameleon, Secret Ingredients, and Link & E621. Global Communication's 1994 ambient album 76:14 is considered to be a landmark of the genre.

The pair also founded their own record label, Evolution, which is sometimes informally referenced as Evolution (Crewekerne) to differentiate it from other record labels with the same name. A compilation of early Evolution material was released jointly by Evolution and Warp Records in 1995 as The Theory of Evolution. The label name later changed to Universal Language Productions and launched a sub-label, Heard, then became E3 before ceasing operations. The labels launched early releases from artists such as Matthew Herbert, as well as Middleton and Pritchard under various guises.

Aside from Schizophrenia, Middleton's solo projects include The Modwheel (experimental house music), Cosmos (progressive house music) The Rebus Project, and AMBA (ambient/classical). In 2007, Middleton abandoned the AMBA moniker, while still focusing on the ambient genre fusing classical traditions with electronica, featuring orchestral, choral and electro acoustic arrangements. A new EP, Excursions 1 was released in September 2007 while the album Lifetracks was released on Big Chill Recordings in October 2007 under the name Tom Middleton.

He collaborated with Matthew Herbert and Mark Darby of Mighty Force Records, releasing an eponymous EP as Fog City.

Middleton extends beyond the confines of house music and electronica to bring seemingly-disparate musical styles together. This approach was evidenced in his 2004 mix The Trip, which the BBC described as "a voyage of discovery full of originality and eclecticism." A follow-up, The Trip II was released in 2008. Both releases consisted of two separate mixes.

== Discography ==
- Tom Middleton Presents Amba: Lifetracks (Big Chill, 2007)
- Glasstracks (Big Chill/Six Degrees 2011)
- Sleep Better (IMC, 2018)
