= Daft Club =

Remix album by Daft Punk
- Released: 1 December 2003
- Genre: House
- Length: 73:15
- Label: Virgin; Labels

Daft Punk chronology
Alive 1997 (2001)	Daft Club (2003)	Human After All (2005)

Daft Club is the first remix album by the French electronic music duo Daft Punk, released on 1 December 2003 by Virgin Records. The album features numerous remixes of tracks from their second album, Discovery (2001), and one from their debut, Homework (1997).

The album received mixed reviews from critics who often considered the remixes of songs from Discovery inferior to their original counterparts.

== Background ==
The name of the album comes from Daft Punk's online music service, which featured remixed songs, a live recording of Daft Punk performing at the Que Club (which would later be released as Alive 1997), and an a cappella and instrumental version of "Harder, Better, Faster, Stronger". The service was available for free to people who bought initial pressings of the Discovery album. Each album included a Daft Club membership card, which granted access to the Daft Club website. The service originally ended in January 2003.

In regards to the album and online music service, Thomas Bangalter stated:

It's great to find a new channel where there is an open access, open door to more, but not more than had to be done before. It's establishing a connection between people that listen to our music and ourselves. There's no limits of time, and it helps people get and listen to this music. A track that could have been done today can be online tomorrow. The other thing is to really express ourselves through the Internet. And the other thing is to really bring some value in the CD itself. Buying the CD should not become a charity thing for the record industry. That's really important, because that's what it became, in a way. People that would buy our CD would say, 'I'm buying the CD because I want to help the artist,' and it's bullshit in a way, to have to think like that. It's a real thing, and it's regretful.

Limited edition copies of the film Interstella 5555: The 5tory of the 5ecret 5tar 5ystem featured Daft Club as a second disc. The track "Something About Us (Love Theme from Interstella 5555)" is omitted from this version. A limited edition of this album was also released in Japan. It includes an extra track and a bonus DVD-Video. The DVD contains a preview of Interstella 5555, interviews in English with Daft Punk, a music video for "Crescendolls" from the film and a video for "Something About Us" that includes a montage of various scenes.

Tracks from Discovery were remixed in Daft Club except "Nightvision", "Superheroes", "High Life", "Veridis Quo" and "Short Circuit". In place of these tracks are additional remixes of "Face to Face", "Harder, Better, Faster, Stronger" and "Aerodynamic", respectively. Also featured is the "Aerodynamic" B-side titled "Aerodynamite", the previously unreleased track "Ouverture" and a remix of the Homework track "Phoenix".

A vinyl repress of the album was released on 9 September 2022. For the 20th anniversary of Interstella 5555, Daft Punk reissued Discovery with Japanese artwork, stickers, and Daft Club membership cards. The represses came out in December 2024. The Daft Club online music service was relaunched retaining access through the membership cards. A store was added featuring various apparel with the Daft Club logo.

== Critical reception ==
Professional ratings
Review scores
Source	Rating
AllMusic	3/5 stars
Blender	2/5 stars
Entertainment Weekly	C−
The Guardian	3/5 stars
musicOMH	(mixed)
Pitchfork	(1.3/10)
Rockfeedback	4/5 stars

Daft Club received mixed reviews. An extremely negative review by Pitchfork features an artist's illustrated interpretations of how the remixed songs compare to the original versions. The review also stated that the album's contributors "all seem intent upon completely decimating the source material" and that "to listen to Daft Club front-to-back is–and it's pointless to exaggerate here–to watch a loved one be physically dismembered."

== Track listing ==
All tracks are written by Thomas Bangalter and Guy-Manuel de Homem-Christo, with additional writers noted.

Daft Club track listing
No.	Title	Writer(s)	Vocals performed by	Length
1.	"Ouverture"			2:41
2.	"Aerodynamic" (Daft Punk remix)			6:11
3.	"Harder, Better, Faster, Stronger" (The Neptunes remix)	Edwin Birdsong	Daft Punk	5:11
4.	"Face to Face" (Cosmo Vitelli remix)	Todd Imperatrice	Todd Edwards	4:55
5.	"Phoenix" (Basement Jaxx remix)			7:52
6.	"Digital Love" (Boris Dlugosch (Note: "Dlugosch" is misspelled "Dlugosh" in the album's official artwork.) remix)	Carlos Sosa; George Duke	Daft Punk	7:30
7.	"Harder, Better, Faster, Stronger" (Jess & Crabbe remix)	Birdsong	Daft Punk	6:00
8.	"Face to Face" (Demon remix)	Imperatrice	Todd Edwards	6:59
9.	"Crescendolls" (Laidback Luke remix)			5:26
10.	"Aerodynamic" (Slum Village remix)			3:37
11.	"Too Long" (Gonzales version)	Anthony Moore		3:13
12.	"Aerodynamite"			7:48
13.	"One More Time" (Romanthony's Unplugged)			3:40
14.	"Something About Us" (Love Theme from Interstella 5555)			2:12
Total length:				73:15

== Charts ==
Chart performance for Daft Club
Chart (2003–2004)	Peak position
French Albums (SNEP)	130
US Top Dance Albums (Billboard)	8

Chart (2021)	Peak position
Swiss Albums (Schweizer Hitparade)	69
