= Discovery (Daft Punk album) =

Studio album by Daft Punk
- Released: 12 March 2001
- Recorded: 1998–2000
- Studio: Daft House (Paris)
- Genres: French house; nu-disco; electro-funk; disco-house
- Length: 60:50
- Label: Virgin
- Producers: Thomas Bangalter; Guy-Manuel de Homem-Christo

Daft Punk chronology
| Homework (1997) | Discovery (2001) | Alive 1997 (2001) |

Japanese standard release
- The Japanese cover, featuring characters from Interstella 5555.

Singles from Discovery
- 1. "One More Time" Released: 13 November 2000; 2. "Aerodynamic" Released: 28 March 2001; 3. "Digital Love" Released: 11 June 2001; 4. "Harder, Better, Faster, Stronger" Released: 13 October 2001; 5. "Face to Face" Released: 10 October 2003; 6. "Something About Us" Released: 14 November 2003

Discovery is the second studio album by the French electronic music duo Daft Punk, released on 12 March 2001 by Virgin Records. It moved from the Chicago house of their first album, Homework (1997), to a house style inspired by disco, post-disco, garage house, and R&B. Thomas Bangalter of Daft Punk described Discovery as an exploration of song structures, musical forms, and childhood nostalgia, compared to the "raw" electronic music of Homework.

Discovery was recorded at Bangalter's home in Paris between 1998 and 2000. It features extensive sampling; some samples are from older records, while others were created by Daft Punk. The electronic musicians Romanthony, Todd Edwards, and DJ Sneak collaborated on some tracks. For the music videos, Daft Punk developed a concept that merged science fiction with the entertainment industry. Inspired by their childhood love for Japanese anime, the duo collaborated with Leiji Matsumoto to produce Interstella 5555: The 5tory of the 5ecret 5tar 5ystem, an anime film with Discovery as the soundtrack.

Before Discovery's release, Daft Punk adopted robot costumes. They also launched Daft Club, a website featuring exclusive tracks and bonus material. Discovery peaked high on several international charts upon release. Critics praised Daft Punk for innovating in house music as they had done with Homework. The album produced six singles: "One More Time" was the most successful, becoming a club hit.

Discovery has been named one of the greatest albums of all time and is credited with influencing electronic and pop production in subsequent decades. In 2020, Rolling Stone included it at number 236 in its updated list of "The 500 Greatest Albums of All Time".

== Background and recording ==
After their debut album, Homework, was released, Thomas Bangalter and Guy-Manuel de Homem-Christo spent most of 1997 touring on the Daftendirektour. For the first half of 1998, the duo were focused on their own personal labels (Note: Bangalter's label was Roulé, and de Homem-Christo's was Crydamoure.) while also working on the video collection D.A.F.T.: A Story About Dogs, Androids, Firemen and Tomatoes. In 1999 and 2000, their time was split between making music for their own labels and recording Discovery. Bangalter noted that Homework influenced many other artists to mimic its sound, prompting Daft Punk to pursue a different direction to better distinguish themselves.

Daft Punk recorded Discovery in their studio, Daft House, in Bangalter's home in Paris. Work started in 1998 and lasted two years. Bangalter and Homem-Christo made music together and separately, in a similar process to Homework. Rather than rely on the drum machines typical for house music, the Roland TR-808 and the TR-909, Daft Punk used an Oberheim DMX, a LinnDrum and a Sequential Circuits Drumtraks. They used samplers including the Akai MPC and E-mu SP-1200, Fender Rhodes and Wurlitzer electric pianos, vocoders including a Roland SVC-350 and a DigiTech Vocalist, and various phaser effects. They used the pitch-correcting software Auto-Tune on vocals "in a way it wasn't designed to work". Bangalter said: "We're interested in making things sound like something other than what they are. There are guitars that sound like synthesizers, and there are synthesizers that sound like guitars." Discovery was mastered by Nilesh Patel, who also had mastered Homework.

One of the first tracks to come out of the Discovery sessions, "One More Time", was completed in 1998 and was left "sitting on a shelf" until its single release in 2000. After completing "Too Long" early in the production, Daft Punk decided that they "didn't want to do 14 more house tracks" in the way the genre is usually defined and thus set out to incorporate a variety of styles for the record. The album features musical contributions from Romanthony, Todd Edwards, and DJ Sneak. Homem-Christo noted that Romanthony and Edwards were among the producers who significantly influenced Daft Punk. The duo had wanted to work with them on Homework but found it difficult to convince them to do so since Daft Punk were still relatively unknown. DJ Sneak wrote the lyrics to "Digital Love" and assisted in its production.

== Music ==
=== Theme ===
Discovery is a concept album. It relates strongly to Daft Punk's childhood memories, incorporating their love of cinema and character. Bangalter said it deals with the duo's experiences growing up in the decade between 1975 and 1985, rather than just being a tribute to the music of that period. The record was designed to reflect a playful, honest, and open-minded attitude toward listening to music. Bangalter compared it to the state of childhood when one does not judge or analyse music. Bangalter noted the stylistic approach was in contrast to that of their previous effort. "Homework [...] was a way to say to the rock kids, like, 'Electronic music is cool'. Discovery was the opposite, of saying to the electronic kids, 'Rock is cool, you know? You can like that.'" He elaborated that Homework had been "a rough and raw thing" focused on sound production and texture; in contrast, the goal of Discovery was to explore song structures and new musical forms, which was inspired by Aphex Twin's "Windowlicker".

=== Composition ===
In his review for AllMusic, John Bush wrote that Discovery is "definitely the New York garage edition" of Homework. He said Daft Punk produced a "glammier, poppier" version of Eurodisco and R&B by over-embellishing their pitch-bend and vocoder effects, including loops of divas, synth-guitars, and electric piano. Stylus Magazine's Keith Gwillim described Discovery as a disco album, with disco's "danceable" and "sappy" elements, including its processed vocals and "prefabricated" guitar solos. Other critics described it as post-disco and electro-funk. Uproxx said it also incorporates French house, while Stereogum described the album as disco-house.

The opening track, "One More Time", features heavily Auto-Tuned and compressed vocals from Romanthony. "Aerodynamic" has a funk groove, an electric guitar solo, and ends with a separate "spacier" electronic segment. The arpeggiated solo was compared to Yngwie Malmsteen by Pulse!. "Digital Love" contains a solo performed on Wurlitzer piano, vintage synthesisers and sequencers; it incorporates elements of pop, new wave, jazz, funk and disco. "Harder, Better, Faster, Stronger" is an electro song. It is followed by "Crescendolls", an instrumental. "Nightvision" is an ambient track. "Superheroes" leans toward the "acid minimalism" of Homework. It begins with a drum roll and includes arpeggios that are said to resemble those in the soundtrack to the 1980 film Flash Gordon. "High Life" is built over a "gibberish" vocal sample and contains an organ-like section. "Something About Us" is a downtempo song, with digitally processed vocals and lounge rhythms.

"Voyager" has guitar riffs, harp-like 80s synths, and a funky bassline. "Veridis Quo" is a "faux-orchestral" synthesiser baroque song; according to Angus Harrison, its title is a pun on the words "very disco". "Short Circuit" is an electro-R&B song with breakbeats and programmed drum patterns. "Face to Face" is a dance-pop song featuring vocals from Todd Edwards and is more pop-oriented than the other tracks on Discovery. Bangalter noted that the preceding track "Short Circuit" represented the act of shutting down and that "Face to Face" represents regaining consciousness and facing reality. "Too Long", the final track, is a ten-minute-long electro-R&B song.

Discovery uses a number of samples. The liner notes credit samples from "I Love You More" by George Duke on "Digital Love", "Cola Bottle Baby" by Edwin Birdsong on "Harder, Better, Faster, Stronger", "Can You Imagine" by The Imperials on "Crescendolls", and "Who's Been Sleeping In My Bed" by Barry Manilow on "Superheroes". "One More Time" contains a sample of the 1979 disco song "More Spell on You" by Eddie Johns. Daft Punk pay royalties to the publishing company that owns the rights, but Johns has never been located; as of 2021, he was owed an estimated "six-to-seven-figure sum" based on streams. Edwards recalled that he and Daft Punk curated 70 samples each to incorporate into "Face to Face". Bangalter said Daft Punk also created "fake samples", which listeners assumed were from disco or funk records. Homem-Christo estimated that the duo played half of the sampled material on Discovery themselves.

== Promotion and release ==
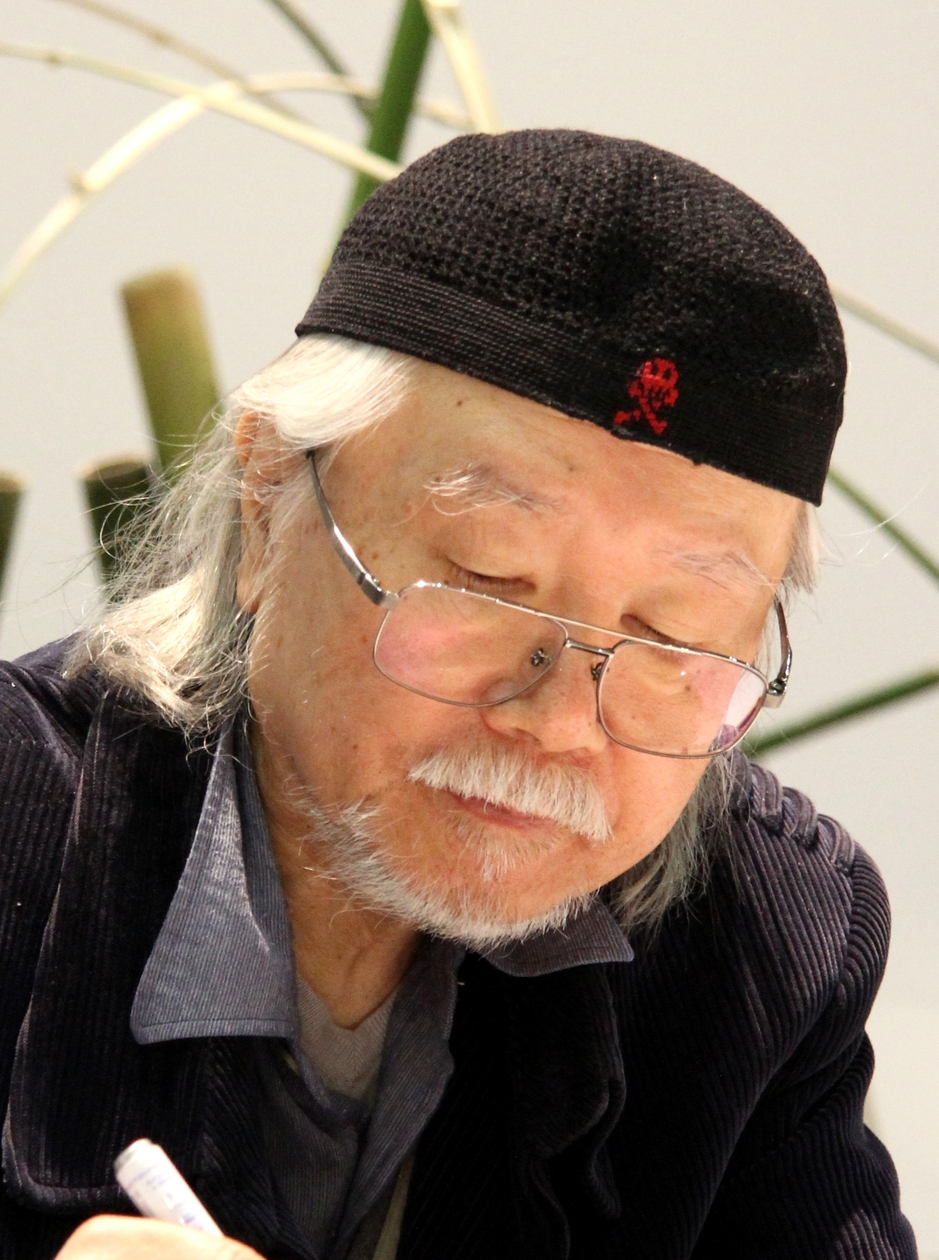
Leiji Matsumoto supervised production of Interstella 5555.

Daft Punk initially planned to release every song on Discovery as a single, according to Orla Lee-Fisher, who was head of marketing for Virgin Records UK at the time, although this plan was eventually shelved. "One More Time" was released in 2000, ahead of the album's release. The album was released on 12 March 2001, followed by singles for "Aerodynamic", "Digital Love", "Harder, Better, Faster, Stronger", "Something About Us", and "Face to Face".

The ideas for music videos formed during the early Discovery recording sessions. The album was originally intended to be accompanied by "a live-action film with each song being a part of the film", according to Todd Edwards. Daft Punk decided instead to concentrate on an anime production. Their concept involved the merging of science fiction with entertainment industry culture. The duo recalled watching Japanese anime as children, including favourites such as Captain Harlock, Grendizer, and Candy Candy. Daft Punk brought the album and the completed story to Tokyo in the hope of creating the film with their childhood hero, Leiji Matsumoto, who had created Captain Harlock. After Matsumoto joined the team as visual supervisor, Shinji Shimizu had been contacted to produce the animation and Kazuhisa Takenouchi to direct the film. With the translation coordination of Tamiyuki "Spike" Sugiyama, production began in October 2000 and ended in April 2003. The result of the collaboration was an anime film, Interstella 5555: The 5tory of the 5ecret 5tar 5ystem, which features the entirety of Discovery as the soundtrack.

Daft Punk adopted robot costumes in the lead-up to Discovery's release. The group told the press they were working in their studio at 9:09 am on 9 September 1999, when their sampler exploded. They had to undergo reconstructive surgery, and, regaining consciousness, they realised they had become robots. Bangalter later stated it was due to the 9999 bug, a precursor to the Y2K bug.

Shortly before the album's release, Daft Punk launched Daft Club, a website that offered exclusive tracks and other bonus material. Every Discovery CD included a Daft Club membership card bearing a unique number that provided personalised access to the website. Bangalter said this was "our way of rewarding people who buy the CD". The service provided by the site ended in 2003; most of the tracks were then compiled into the remix album Daft Club. For the 20th anniversary of Interstella 5555, Daft Punk reissued Discovery with Japanese artwork, stickers, and Daft Club membership cards.

== Commercial performance ==
Discovery reached number two on the UK Albums Chart and the French Albums Chart and number 23 on the US Billboard 200. It debuted at number two on the Canadian Albums Chart, selling 13,850 copies in its first week. It was certified triple platinum in France in 2007 for shipments of 600,000 copies and certified gold by the Recording Industry Association of America on 11 October 2010.

As of May 2013, Discovery had sold 802,000 copies in the US. "One More Time" was its most successful single, reaching number one on the French charts and the Billboard Hot Dance Club Songs charts and reaching the top ten on seven other charts. It remained Daft Punk's most successful single until the release of "Get Lucky" in 2013. The fifth single, "Face to Face", reached number one on the Billboard Hot Dance Club Songs chart in 2004. Discovery had sold at least 2.6 million copies as of 2005.

== Critical reception ==
Professional ratings
Aggregate scores
| Source | Rating |
|---|---|
| Metacritic | 74/100 |
Review scores
| Source | Rating |
| AllMusic | 5/5 stars |
| Entertainment Weekly | B |
| The Guardian | 2/5 stars |
| Mixmag | 5/5 stars |
| NME | 9/10 |
| Pitchfork | 6.4/10 |
| Q | 5/5 stars |
| Rolling Stone | 3/5 stars |
| The Rolling Stone Album Guide | 3.5/5 stars |
| Spin | 8/10 |

At Metacritic, which assigns a normalised rating out of 100 to reviews from mainstream publications, Discovery has an average score of 74, based on 19 reviews. Some listeners were confused by the more polished sound, the heavy metal element of "Aerodynamic", and the use of Auto-Tune. AllMusic's John Bush said that, with their comprehensive productions and loops, Daft Punk had developed a sound that was "worthy of bygone electro-pop technicians from Giorgio Moroder to Todd Rundgren to Steve Miller." Q wrote that Discovery was vigorous and innovative in its exploration of "old questions and spent ideals", hailing it as "a towering, persuasive tour de force" that "transcends the dance label" with no shortage of ideas, humour, or "brilliance". Q named Discovery one of the best 50 albums of 2001.

Joshua Clover, writing in Spin, dubbed Discovery disco's "latest triumph". He felt that while it "flags a bit" near the end, the opening songs were on par with albums such as Prince's Sign o' the Times (1987) and Nirvana's Nevermind (1991). Stephen Dalton from NME found the pop art ideas enthralling and credited Daft Punk for "re-inventing the mid-'80s as the coolest pop era ever." In Entertainment Weekly, Will Hermes wrote that the "beat editing and EQ wizardry still wow," but asked Daft Punk for "less comedy, more ecstasy." Mixmag called Discovery "the perfect non-pop pop album" and said Daft Punk had "altered the course of dance music for the second time".

Ben Ratliff from Rolling Stone wrote that few songs on Discovery matched the grandiosity of "One More Time". He found most of them "muddled – not only in the spectrum between serious and jokey but in its sense of an identity." In The Guardian, Alexis Petridis felt Daft Punk's attempt to "salvage" older musical references resembled Homework but was less coherent and successful. The Pitchfork editor Ryan Schreiber found the "prog and disco" hybrid "relatively harmless" and said it was not "meant to be judged on its lyrics", which "rarely go beyond sensitive junior high poetry". Robert Christgau, writing in The Village Voice, facetiously said the album may appeal to young enthusiasts of Berlin techno and computing, but it was too "French" and "spirituel" for American tastes. In a retrospective review for The Rolling Stone Album Guide (2004), Douglas Wolk gave Discovery three and a half out of five and wrote that "the more [Daft Punk] dumb the album down, the funkier it gets", with an emphasis on hooks over songs.

== Legacy ==
In 2005, Pitchfork named Discovery the 12th-best album of 2000–2004. It was later named the third-best of the decade by Pitchfork, the 12th-best by Rhapsody, and the fourth-best by Resident Advisor. In 2012, Rolling Stone ranked Discovery the 8th-best EDM album and included it at number 236 in its 2020 list of the "500 Greatest Albums of All Time". It was included on BBC Radio 1's Masterpieces in December 2009 In 2023, British GQ named Discovery the sixth-best electronic album.

In 2015, Vice named Discovery the greatest dance album, writing: "When some extraterrestrial race looks back on the artifacts of 21st century dance music, if Discovery isn’t the most importantly examined fossil, it will at least be the soundtrack to their research. [...] Daft Punk brought electronic dance music to the forefront of modern pop culture, gifting the masses with something that wasn’t just infectious, but for many, lifechanging." In 2024, Apple Music included Discovery at number 23 on their "100 Best Albums" list.

In 2020, Petridis said he had reconsidered his Guardian review, describing the influence of Discovery on pop production over the following years: "Daft Punk were incredibly prescient: play Discovery today and it sounds utterly contemporary. My review, on the other hand, has not aged so well." In 2021, Pitchfork included Discovery on its list of review scores "we'd change if we could", upgrading its score from 6.4 to 10 out of 10. The Pitchfork critic Noah Yoo wrote, "If scores are meant to indicate a work's longevity or impact, the original review is invalidated by the historic record. Daft Punk's second album, Discovery, is the centrepiece of their career, an album that transcended the robots' club roots and rippled through the decades that followed."

Soft rock samples became commonplace in dance music, influenced by Discovery. Several artists have sampled Discovery. Kanye West's 2007 single "Stronger" features a sample of "Harder, Better, Faster, Stronger"; Daft Punk performed "Stronger" with West at the 2008 Grammy Awards. Wiley's 2008 single "Summertime" features a sample of "Aerodynamic". "Veridis Quo" was sampled in the 2009 Jazmine Sullivan single "Dream Big" and in the 2023 Maluma song "Coco Loco". "One More Time" was sampled in the 2022 single "Circo Loco" by Drake and 21 Savage.

== Track listing ==
All tracks are written by Thomas Bangalter and Guy-Manuel de Homem-Christo, with additional writers noted.

| No. | Title | Writer(s) | Length |
|---|---|---|---|
| 1. | "One More Time" | Anthony Moore | 5:20 |
| 2. | "Aerodynamic" | | 3:27 |
| 3. | "Digital Love" | Carlos Sosa; George Duke | 4:58 |
| 4. | "Harder, Better, Faster, Stronger" | Edwin Birdsong | 3:45 |
| 5. | "Crescendolls" | Dwight Brewster; Aleta Jennings | 3:31 |
| 6. | "Nightvision" | | 1:44 |
| 7. | "Superheroes" | Barry Manilow; Marty Panzer | 3:57 |
| 8. | "High Life" | | 3:22 |
| 9. | "Something About Us" | | 3:51 |
| 10. | "Voyager" | | 3:47 |
| 11. | "Veridis Quo" | | 5:44 |
| 12. | "Short Circuit" | | 3:26 |
| 13. | "Face to Face" | Todd Imperatrice | 3:58 |
| 14. | "Too Long" | Moore | 10:00 |
| Total length: | | | 60:50 |

== Personnel ==
Adapted from Discovery liner notes.

- Daft Punk – vocals (tracks 3, 4, 9), vocoders, sequencers, sampling, synthesizers, Wurlitzer electric piano, guitars, bass, talkbox, drum machines, production, concept, art direction
- Romanthony – vocals (tracks 1, 14), co-production (track 14)
- Todd Edwards – vocals and co-production (track 13)
- Nilesh Patel – mastering
- Alex & Martin – concept, art direction
- Cédric Hervet – concept, art direction
- Gildas Loaëc – concept, art direction
- Simon Scott – concept, art direction
- Daniel Vangarde – concept, art direction
- Pedro Winter – concept, art direction
- Mitchell Feinberg – liquid metal photos
- Luis Sanchis – piano photo
- Tony Gardner, Alterian – bionics engineering
- Tamiyuki "Spike" Sugiyama – Tokyo connector

== Charts ==
=== Weekly charts ===
| Chart (2001) | Peak position |
|---|---|
| Australian Albums (ARIA) | 7 |
| Australian Dance Albums (ARIA) | 1 |
| Austrian Albums (Ö3 Austria) | 6 |
| Belgian Albums (Ultratop Flanders) | 1 |
| Belgian Albums (Ultratop Wallonia) | 3 |
| Canadian Albums (Billboard) | 2 |
| Danish Albums (Hitlisten) | 12 |
| Dutch Albums (Album Top 100) | 11 |
| European Albums (Billboard) | 2 |
| Finnish Albums (Suomen virallinen lista) | 16 |
| French Albums (SNEP) | 2 |
| German Albums (Offizielle Top 100) | 5 |
| Greek Albums (IFPI) | 2 |
| Irish Albums (IRMA) | 4 |
| Italian Albums (FIMI) | 8 |
| New Zealand Albums (RMNZ) | 8 |
| Norwegian Albums (VG-lista) | 3 |
| Polish Albums (ZPAV) | 13 |
| Portuguese Albums (AFP) | 6 |
| Scottish Albums (Official Charts) | 2 |
| Spanish Albums (AFYVE) | 15 |
| Swedish Albums (Sverigetopplistan) | 7 |
| Swiss Albums (Schweizer Hitparade) | 6 |
| UK Albums (Official Charts) | 2 |
| US Billboard 200 | 23 |

| Chart (2013) | Peak position |
|---|---|
| US Top Catalog Albums (Billboard) | 1 |
| US Vinyl Albums (Billboard) | 12 |

| Chart (2021–2022) | Peak position |
|---|---|
| Hungarian Albums (MAHASZ) | 30 |
| Lithuanian Albums (AGATA) | 26 |
| US Top Dance Albums (Billboard) | 1 |

| Chart (2024) | Peak position |
|---|---|
| Scottish Albums (OCC) | 19 |
| UK Albums (OCC) | 72 |

=== Year-end charts ===
| Chart (2001) | Position |
|---|---|
| Australian Albums (ARIA) | 100 |
| Australian Dance Albums (ARIA) | 14 |
| Austrian Albums (Ö3 Austria) | 69 |
| Belgian Albums (Ultratop Flanders) | 33 |
| Belgian Albums (Ultratop Wallonia) | 20 |
| Belgian Alternative Albums (Ultratop Flanders) | 16 |
| Canadian Albums (Nielsen SoundScan) | 93 |
| Dutch Albums (Album Top 100) | 81 |
| European Top 100 Albums (Music & Media) | 29 |
| French Albums (SNEP) | 15 |
| German Albums (Offizielle Top 100) | 37 |
| Swiss Albums (Schweizer Hitparade) | 54 |
| UK Albums (OCC) | 48 |
| US Top Dance/Electronic Albums (Billboard) | 6 |

| Chart (2002) | Position |
|---|---|
| French Albums (SNEP) | 96 |

| Chart (2008) | Position |
|---|---|
| Australian Dance Albums (ARIA) | 48 |

| Chart (2013) | Position |
|---|---|
| Australian Dance Albums (ARIA) | 48 |
| Belgian Midprice Albums (Ultratop Flanders) | 42 |
| Belgian Midprice Albums (Ultratop Flanders) | 26 |
| UK Albums (OCC) | 196 |

| Chart (2016) | Position |
|---|---|
| Australian Dance Albums (ARIA) | 48 |

| Chart (2018) | Position |
|---|---|
| US Top Dance/Electronic Albums (Billboard) | 22 |

| Chart (2020) | Position |
|---|---|
| US Top Dance/Electronic Albums (Billboard) | 22 |

| Chart (2021) | Position |
|---|---|
| Australian Dance Albums (ARIA) | 32 |
| Belgian Albums (Ultratop Wallonia) | 196 |
| US Top Dance/Electronic Albums (Billboard) | 18 |

| Chart (2022) | Position |
|---|---|
| Australian Dance Albums (ARIA) | 36 |
| Belgian Albums (Ultratop Wallonia) | 179 |
| US Top Dance/Electronic Albums (Billboard) | 15 |

| Chart (2023) | Position |
|---|---|
| US Top Dance/Electronic Albums (Billboard) | 11 |

| Chart (2024) | Position |
|---|---|
| US Top Dance/Electronic Albums (Billboard) | 21 |

| Chart (2025) | Position |
|---|---|
| US Top Dance/Electronic Albums (Billboard) | 12 |

== Certifications ==
| Region | Certification | Certified units/sales |
|---|---|---|
| Australia (ARIA) | Gold | 35,000^{^} |
| Belgium (BRMA) | Platinum | 50,000^{*} |
| Canada (Music Canada) | Gold | 50,000^{^} |
| Denmark (IFPI Danmark) | Platinum | 20,000^{‡} |
| France (SNEP) | 3× Platinum | 800,000 |
| Germany (BVMI) | Gold | 150,000^{^} |
| Italy (FIMI) sales since 2009 | Platinum | 50,000^{‡} |
| Japan (RIAJ) | Platinum | 200,000^{^} |
| New Zealand (RMNZ) | Platinum | 15,000^{‡} |
| Switzerland (IFPI Switzerland) | Gold | 20,000^{^} |
| United Kingdom (BPI) | 2× Platinum | 657,000 |
| United States (RIAA) | Gold | 805,000 |
Summaries
| Europe (IFPI) | 2× Platinum | 2,000,000^{*} |
^{*} Sales figures based on certification alone.^{^} Shipments figures based on certification alone.^{‡} Sales+streaming figures based on certification alone.
