= Alive (Daft Punk) =

Alive is the title of several songs, albums, and tours by French band Daft Punk:

- "Alive", a song off the 1997 album Homework
- Alive 1997, a 2001 live album recorded in 1997
- Alive 2006/2007, a 2006-2007 concert tour
  - Alive 2007, a 2008 concert album recorded during the tour
