= Something About Us =

Something About Us may refer to:

- "Something About Us" (Daft Punk song)
- "Something About Us" (No Angels song)
