= Interstella 5555: The 5tory of the 5ecret 5tar 5ystem =

2003 animated film

- Theatrical release poster

Japanese name
- Katakana: インターステラ5555
Transcriptions
- Revised Hepburn: Intāsutera Fō Faibu
- Directed by: Kazuhisa Takenouchi
- Written by: Thomas Bangalter; Guy-Manuel de Homem-Christo; Cédric Hervet
- Based on: Discovery by Daft Punk
- Produced by: Thomas Bangalter; Guy-Manuel de Homem-Christo
- Cinematography: Fumio Hirokawa
- Edited by: Shigeru Nishiyama; Olivier Gajan
- Music by: Daft Punk; (featuring); Romanthony; Todd Edwards; DJ Sneak
- Production companies: Toei Animation; Daft Life Ltd.; Wild Bunch; BAC Films
- Distributed by: EMI/Virgin Records
- Release dates: 18 May 2003 (Cannes); 28 May 2003 (Worldwide)
- Running time: 65 minutes
- Countries: France; Japan
- Language: English
- Budget: $4 million
- Box office: $6.9 million

Interstella 5555: The 5tory of the 5ecret 5tar 5ystem (インターステラ5555, Intāsutera Fō Faibu; "Four Five") is a 2003 anime musical science fiction film. It was written by Daft Punk and Cédric Hervet, produced by Toei Animation, directed by Kazuhisa Takenouchi, and supervised by Leiji Matsumoto. The film tells the story of the abduction and rescue of an extraterrestrial pop band.

The film also serves as a visual companion to Discovery, Daft Punk's second studio album. The film has no dialogue, but instead consists of the entirety of Discovery with minimal sound effects. (Note: Although no dialogue is featured in the film, some characters are depicted to be talking or singing. Some examples with main characters: Shep sings "Digital Love" and "Something About Us"; Octave sings "One More Time" and appears to convey information in "Short Circuit"; Darkwood talks to Stella during "Crescendolls" and in "Veridis Quo", he reads from the eponymous book as part of the ritual.) Thus, it turns Discovery into a concept album.

== Plot ==
The main points of the story coincide with the Discovery album. On an alien planet in a city populated by blue-skinned humanoids, keyboardist Octave, guitarist Arpegius, drummer Baryl, and bass guitarist Stella are playing to a packed audience in a stadium, broadcast around the whole planet. (Note: "One More Time") A military force from Earth invades the planet and kidnaps most of the band members. Although Arpegius escapes, he too, is captured when a trooper shoots him with a tranquilizer dart. (Note: "Aerodynamic")

Shep, a space pilot, is seen daydreaming about Stella while working on his guitar-shaped ship. Interrupted by a distress call about the kidnapping, he pursues the culprits through a wormhole and crash lands on Earth. (Note: "Digital Love")

Meanwhile, the band is taken to an underground facility where their memories are transferred into disks and replaced with fake memories, and their blue skin is changed to make them resemble humans. They are fitted with mind-control devices hidden inside sunglasses. (Note: "Harder, Better, Faster, Stronger") Their captor, Earl de Darkwood, poses as their manager and presents them as a new band, The Crescendolls, who quickly become very popular. (Note: "Crescendolls") The fame has its disadvantages as the exhausted members of the band are forced to sign large amounts of publicity material. Meanwhile, Shep finds his way to the city and discovers what has happened to the band. (Note: "Nightvision")

Shep flies into a Crescendolls stadium concert with a jet pack and fires a beam at each band member, freeing all of them from the mind control except Stella, who is blocked by Earl de Darkwood. During the escape, Shep is mortally wounded by Darkwood's robotic bodyguards. (Note: "Superheroes")

Still under Darkwood's control, Stella finds a card with the address of Darkwood's home, Darkwood Manor, which she hides in her dress. She is then taken to an awards ceremony where the Crescendolls win the Gold Record, a coveted music award. Baryl, concealed in the audience, frees Stella with the beam, and they escape with Octave's help. (Note: "High Life") The band returns to Shep, who reveals their true identities and his feelings for Stella before he dies. (Note: "Something About Us") They bury him, and his spirit rises into space. Driving away in a stolen van, they use the card Stella took earlier to travel to Darkwood Manor. (Note: "Voyager")

While exploring Darkwood Manor, the band discovers a secret room, where they find a journal revealing Darkwood's plans entitled Veridis Quo. He has been kidnapping alien musicians from various worlds and passing them off as human musicians in order to acquire 5,555 Gold Records, with which he can rule the universe. While the band is reading the book, Darkwood appears with a group of cloaked devotees and captures them. He attempts to sacrifice Stella to complete the ritual required to unlock the Gold Records' power, but the band manages to defeat his robotic henchman. Arpegius throws the final Gold Record into a lava-filled chasm. Darkwood follows it into the abyss, apparently dying as a result. His followers accompany him, resulting in their deaths as well. (Note: "Veridis Quo") Following this, Darkwood Manor collapses in on itself. The band narrowly escapes and visits their record company's headquarters to retrieve their memory disks. Octave sneaks in to steal them, but he is tased by a guard while escaping the building, and his skin reverts to its true natural blue color. (Note: "Short Circuit")

The authorities find Shep's ship along with Veridis Quo and mount an operation to restore the Crescendolls' true original memories and send them back to their home planet via the same wormhole that Shep used. (Note: "Face to Face") As they enter the wormhole, the spirit of Darkwood appears and attacks their ship. Shep's spirit also appears and defeats Darkwood, freeing them. The band returns to their home planet to great acclaim, performing in the stadium which is broadcast around the universe, and a statue of Shep is erected in the city park. (Note: "Too Long")

At the film's end, it is implied that the whole story was the dream of a young boy who is a Daft Punk fan, inspired by the Discovery album and toys, including the Daft Punk merchandise in his room.

== Characters ==
- Stella – The bassist of the Crescendolls and the only female member.
- Shep – An alien astronaut on a mission to rescue the captured Crescendolls. He has a crush on Stella. Shep's singing voice is provided by Daft Punk's performance of "Digital Love" and "Something About Us".
- Arpegius – The guitarist of the Crescendolls.
- Octave – The keyboardist and vocalist of the Crescendolls. Octave's singing voice is provided by Romanthony's performance of "One More Time" and "Too Long".
- Baryl – The drummer of the Crescendolls. He is noticeably shorter in stature than most of the other characters.
- Earl de Darkwood – The human captor of the Crescendolls and the main antagonist of the film.
- Record Co. Owner – The supposed owner of the record company. He is giddy and excited in most of his on-screen time.
- Daft Punk – The masked musicians themselves make a cameo appearance in "High Life" and "Too Long".

== Production ==
The idea of making a feature film to visualize Discovery came about during the album's early recording sessions. Daft Punk's concept for the story involved the merging of science fiction with entertainment industry culture. The duo had initially conceived of a live-action film featuring themes of overcoming oppression and rebelling against the machinery of life. After the live-action approach was discarded, several styles of animation were considered before settling on that of Daft Punk's childhood hero, Leiji Matsumoto.

The film concept was further developed with Daft Punk collaborator Cédric Hervet, with Bangalter and Hervet writing the script. A team consisting of Daft Punk, Hervet, Pedro Winter and Gildas Loaec were introduced to Toei Animation through a connection at Toshiba EMI. The script was brought to Tokyo in July 2000 in the hope of collaborating with Matsumoto, who remarked that he in turn was inspired by French filmmakers. After Matsumoto joined the team as visual supervisor, Shinji Shimizu had been contacted to produce the animation and Kazuhisa Takenouchi to direct. With the translation coordination of Tamiyuki "Spike" Sugiyama, production began in October 2000 and ended in April 2003. Daft Punk commuted to Tokyo on a near-monthly basis as Toei produced the storyboards. The production cost was reportedly $4 million.

Many elements common to Matsumoto's stories, such as romanticism of noble sacrifice and remembrance of fallen friends, appear in Interstella 5555. Daft Punk revealed in an interview that Captain Harlock was a great influence on them in their childhood. They also stated, "The music we have been making must have been influenced at some point by the shows we were watching when we were little kids."

== Release ==
Four segments were released to serve as music videos for Discovery's singles, and were shown on Cartoon Network's Toonami programming block on 31 August 2001. Cartoon Network later hosted the episodes online as part of their short-lived Toonami Reactor project (later revived as Toonami Jetstream). The song "Something About Us" was released on vinyl as the "Love Theme" and tie-in single for the film. In December 2003, Interstella 5555 was released along with the album Daft Club, which served to promote the film and provided previously unreleased remixes of tracks from the Discovery album. The film premiered at Cannes Film Festival in 2003, with a short theatrical run and home media release following its premiere. A Blu-ray edition was released later in September 2011 and contains similar artwork packaging.

=== Re-releases and remaster ===
On 22 February 2024, Daft Punk streamed the film in full on Twitch as the third celebration of "Daft Punk Day", the anniversary of the duo's split. A repress of the "Something About Us" vinyl single was released on Record Store Day in 2024. The Japanese edition of Discovery featuring cover art from the film was also repressed and released globally later the same year.

In June 2024, a 4K "remaster", upscaled with artificial intelligence, was shown at the UGC Normandie in Paris, as well as at Tribeca Festival, marking the film's North American theatrical premiere. The use of AI was criticized by Daft Punk fans. The remaster was overseen by Cédric Hervet, Daft Punk's creative manager and film co-writer. The film was animated digitally in standard definition and was converted between NTSC and PAL encodings during the production process, creating issues in framerate and resolution upon initial release in 2003. These issues, in addition to the original masters being unrecoverable from Japan, prevented a proper restoration and led to the use of AI upscaling to allow a more presentable theatrical exhibition. This restoration received a global theatrical rollout on 12 December 2024 in over 1500 venues.

== Track listing ==
No.	Title	Length
1.	"One More Time" (edit)	4:57
2.	"Aerodynamic" (extended intro)	3:42
3.	"Digital Love" (edit)	4:30
4.	"Harder, Better, Faster, Stronger"	3:44
5.	"Crescendolls"	3:32
6.	"Nightvision"	1:44
7.	"Superheroes"	3:58
8.	"High Life"	3:22
9.	"Something About Us"	3:51
10.	"Voyager"	3:48
11.	"Veridis Quo" (extended)	6:45
12.	"Short Circuit"	3:27
13.	"Face to Face"	4:00
14.	"Too Long"	10:00
15.	"Aerodynamic" (Daft Punk remix, (Note: This version differs from the Daft Punk remix featured in Daft Club.) end credits)	2:08

== Reception ==
On the review aggregator website Rotten Tomatoes, 80% of 10 critics' reviews are positive, with an average rating of 7.8/10. on IMDb.

The BBC gave the film four stars out of five, saying that the film is a "visual and aural treat of intergalactic proportions". MovieMartyr.com said that the film was "the best animated film made in 2003, and a true testament to the artistry possible in two very different mediums." Mania.com concluded by stating that the film is "a unique feature that shows just how well music can be blended to animation to make a compelling story."

Empire said the film was "Fine if you like the band – you'll be treated to some cartoons playing over the top of their Discovery album. For everyone else, just daft."
