= Daftendirektour =

1997 concert tour by Daft Punk

- Tour by Daft Punk
- Promotional poster for the tour
- Location: Europe; North America
- Associated album: Homework
- Start date: 11 February 1997
- End date: 20 December 1997
- No. of shows: 71; 56 in Europe; 14 in North America; 1 In Middle East

Daft Punk concert chronology
- Daftendirektour (1997); Alive 2006/2007 (2006–2007)

Daftendirektour was the first concert tour by the French electronic music duo Daft Punk. The tour spanned from February to December 1997.

== Background ==
For this tour, Daft Punk used their home studio equipment for the live stage. As Thomas Bangalter of the duo stated, "Everything was synched up—the drum machines, the bass lines. The sequencer was just sending out the tempos and controlling the beats and bars. On top of this structure we built all these layers of samples and various parts that we could bring in whenever we wanted to." Little video footage from the tour has been released. A clip featuring "Rollin' & Scratchin'" can be seen on D.A.F.T.: A Story About Dogs, Androids, Firemen and Tomatoes. Elements of the track "Alive" can also be heard as it was performed at the Mayan Theater in Los Angeles, California. The band had used several machines running ArKaos software into a custom visual setup.

Daft Punk released a live album, Alive 1997, in 2001, which featured their performance at Que Club Birmingham on 8 November 1997. The recording was selected by Daft Punk themselves for release, as they considered it to be their favorite from the Daftendirektour. In 2022, a recording of the complete Mayan Theater set from the tour was streamed to promote the rerelease of Homework and Alive 1997.

== Set list ==
Average set list based on known performances from 14 June 1997, 9 August 1997, 8 November 1997, and 17 December 1997. Shows were improvised and the order and number of songs varied across the tour, although the setlist below was usually played (minus the encore).

1. "Musique"
2. "Revolution 909"
3. "Fresh"
4. "Short Circuit" (early version)
5. "Daftendirekt" / "Da Funk"
6. "Da Funk" (Armand van Helden's Ten Minutes of Funk mix)
7. "Rollin' & Scratchin'"
8. Unreleased
9. "Alive" / "Can You Feel It" (cover of CLS)
10. "Burnin'"
11. "French Kiss" (cover of Lil Louis)
12. "Around the World" / "The Chase" (cover of Giorgio Moroder)
13. "Teachers"
14. "Rock'n Roll" / Oh Yeah / "You Can't Hide From Your Bud" (cover of DJ Sneak) (encore)

No official setlist has ever been published from this tour, and some misinformation has spread surrounding the setlist. In some publications for Alive 1997, the transition between "Short Circuit" and "Daftendirekt" is titled "WDPK (Part I)" and the unreleased song between "Rollin' & Scratchin'" and "Alive" has been titled by fans as an alternate live version of "Revolution 909," as "WDPK (Part II)," or as a song titled "Pulsar." At least once, "Fresh" and the album version of "Revolution 909" were performed live between "Musique" and "Short Circuit".

== Tour dates ==
Date	City	Country	Venue
North America
11 February 1997	Chicago	United States	Roller State Rink
Europe
2 March 1997	London	United Kingdom	The Bunker Club
12 April 1997	Manchester	United Kingdom	Manchester Academy
15 May 1997	Paris	France	Rex Club
7 June 1997 (Note: The performance in Rimini on 7 June 1997, was part of the Rimini Dance Festival.)	Rimini	Italy	Rimini Dance Festival
12 June 1997 (Note: The performance in Barcelona on 12 June 1997, was part of the Sónar Festival.)	Barcelona	Spain	Sónar Festival
14 June 1997 (Note: The performance in Hultsfred on 14 June 1997, was part of the Hultsfred Festival.)	Hultsfred	Sweden	Lake Hulingen
21 June 1997 (Note: The performance in Holland on 21 June 1997, was part of the New Frontier Festival.)	Utrecht	Netherlands	New Frontier Festival
22 June 1997 (Note: The performance in Scheeßel on 22 June 1997, was part of the Hurricane Festival.)	Scheeßel	Germany	Eichenring
27 June 1997 (Note: The performance in Roskilde on 27 June 1997, was part of the Roskilde Festival.)	Roskilde	Denmark	Festivalpladsen
29 June 1997 (Note: The performance in Somerset on 29 June 1997, was part of the Glastonbury Festival.)	Pilton	United Kingdom	Glastonbury Festival
2 July 1997 (Note: The performance in Kristiansand on 2 July 1997, was part of the Quart Festival.)	Kristiansand	Norway	Odderøya
4 July 1997 (Note: The performance in Torhout on 4 July 1997, was part of the Rock Torhout festival.)	Torhout	Belgium	Achiel Eeckloo Rockweide
5 July 1997 (Note: The performance in Werchter on 5 July 1997, was part of the Rock Werchter festival.)	Werchter	Belgium	Werchterpark
Middle East
7 July 1997 (Note: The performance in Eshkol on 7 July 1997, was part of the Second Edition of the Dance & Levi's festival.)	Eshkol	Israel	Eshkol National Park
Europe
12 July 1997 (Note: The performance in Balado on 12 July 1997, was part of the T in the Park Festival.)	Balado	United Kingdom	Balado Airfield
9 August 1997 (Note: The performance in Montpellier on 9 August 1997 was part of the Boréalis festival.)	Montpellier	France	Espace Grammont
16 August 1997 (Note: The performances in Leeds on 16 August 1997, and in Chelmsford on 17 August 1997, were part of the V97 Festival.)	Leeds	United Kingdom	Temple Newsam
17 August 1997	Chelmsford	United Kingdom	Hylands Park
North America
1 September 1997	Toronto	Canada	The Warehouse
3 September 1997	New York City	United States	Roseland Ballroom
4 September 1997	Chicago	United States	Metro Chicago
6 September 1997	Seattle	United States	Showbox Comedy and Supper Club
9 September 1997	San Francisco	United States	The Fillmore
12 September 1997	Los Angeles	United States	El Rey Theater
22 September 1997	Toronto	Canada	The Guvernement
23 September 1997	New York City	United States	Irving Plaza
24 September 1997	Miami	United States	Cameo Theater
25 September 1997	San Francisco	United States	The Fillmore
27 September 1997	Los Angeles	United States	American Legion Hall
28 September 1997	Seattle	United States	DV8
Europe
2 October 1997	Amsterdam	Netherlands	Paradiso
3 October 1997	Lille	France	L'Aéronef
4 October 1997	Brussels	Belgium	Ancienne Belgique
6 October 1997	Saarbrücken	Germany	Garage
7 October 1997	Köln	Germany	Live Music Hall
8 October 1997	Dortmund	Germany	Soundgarden
9 October 1997	Hamburg	Germany	Große Freiheit 36
11 October 1997	Berlin	Germany	Huxley's Neue Welt
12 October 1997	Stuttgart	Germany	LKA Longhorn
13 October 1997	Strasbourg	France	La Laiterie
17 October 1997	Paris	France	L'elysée Montmartre
18 October 1997 (Note: The performance in Paris on 18 October 1997, was part of the Paris Jazz Festival.)	Paris	France	Zénith de Paris
20 October 1997	Rouen	France	Exo 7
21 October 1997	Rennes	France	La Liberté
24 October 1997	Southampton	United Kingdom	Southampton Guildhall
26 October 1997	Dublin	Ireland	Red Box
28 October 1997	Newcastle upon Tyne	United Kingdom	Mayfair Ballroom
30 October 1997	Leeds	United Kingdom	Town and Country Club
31 October 1997	Glasgow	United Kingdom	Barrowland Ballroom
1 November 1997	Manchester	United Kingdom	Manchester Academy
3 November 1997	Cambridge	United Kingdom	Corn Exchange
5 November 1997	London	United Kingdom	Astoria Theater
6 November 1997	London	United Kingdom	Astoria Theater
8 November 1997	Birmingham	United Kingdom	Que Club
9 November 1997	Nottingham	United Kingdom	Rock City
10 November 1997	Brighton	United Kingdom	Escape Club
12 November 1997	Brest	France	Petite Salle de Penfeld
14 November 1997	Madrid	Spain	Aqualung
15 November 1997	Barcelona	Spain	Zeleste
17 November 1997	Bordeaux	France	Espace Medoquine
18 November 1997	Toulouse	France	Salle Des Fetes
20 November 1997	Marseille	France	Le Dome
21 November 1997	Geneva	Switzerland	Palladium
22 November 1997	Lyon	France	Transbordeur
24 November 1997	Milan	Italy	Rolling Stone Club
25 November 1997	Florence	Italy	Tenax
26 November 1997	Rome	Italy	Frontiera
27 November 1997	Paris	France	Zénith de Paris
29 November 1997	Zürich	Switzerland	Jail
30 November 1997	Vienna	Austria	Libro Music Hall
1 December 1997	Munich	Germany	Kunstpark Ost, KW – das Heizkraftwerk
3 December 1997	Hanover	Germany	Capitol
4 December 1997	Mannheim	Germany	MS Connexion
8 December 1997	Paris	France	Élysée Montmartre
North America
17 December 1997	Los Angeles	United States	Mayan Theater
20 December 1997	New York City	United States	Hammerstein Ballroom
Europe
20 December 1997	Berlin	Germany	Einlass
