= Face to Face (Daft Punk song) =

2003 single by Daft Punk

Single by Daft Punk

from the album Discovery
- Released: 10 October 2003
- Genre: Dance-pop
- Length: 3:58
- Label: Virgin
- Songwriters: Thomas Bangalter; Guy-Manuel de Homem-Christo; Todd Imperatrice
- Producers: Daft Punk; Todd Edwards

Daft Punk singles chronology
"Harder, Better, Faster, Stronger" (2001)	"Face to Face" (2003)	"Something About Us" (2003)

Alternative cover
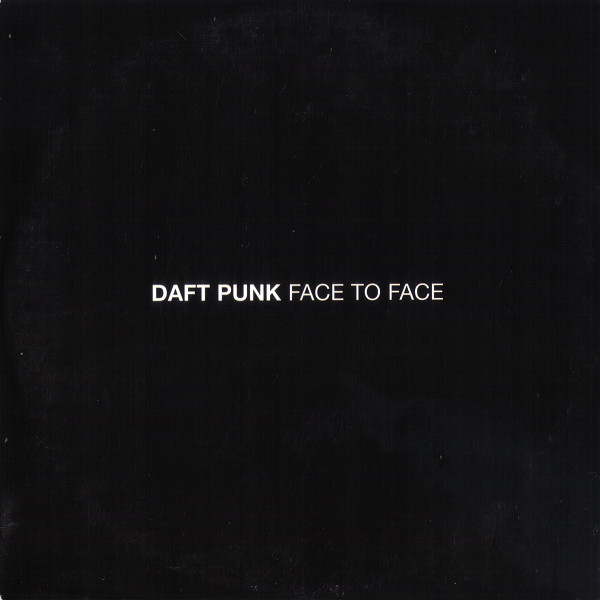
- Promotional single cover

Music video
- "Face to Face" on YouTube

"Face to Face" is a song by the French electronic music duo Daft Punk, featuring vocals and co-production by the American house music producer Todd Edwards. It was released on Daft Punk's second album Discovery (2001) and as a promotional single on 10 October 2003. As part of Discovery, the song appears in the film Interstella 5555: The 5tory of the 5ecret 5tar 5ystem, and the section of the film in which the song appears serves as its music video.

The track uses Edwards' distinctive "cut-up" production style, incorporating over 20 uncredited samples from various soft rock and folk music songs. Daft Punk first successfully convinced Edwards to collaborate with them after the release of Homework (1997), meeting for two studio sessions to record and build the track.

The song achieved commercial success, reaching the number one spot on the Billboard Hot Dance Club Play chart in 2004. Two remixes by Cosmo Vitelli and Demon were made and included in Daft Punk's 2003 remix album Daft Club. Most of the samples remained unknown, being a subject of a search that continued until 2023, when fans used AI tools and asking Edwards to help uncover the remaining unknown samples.

== Background and recording ==
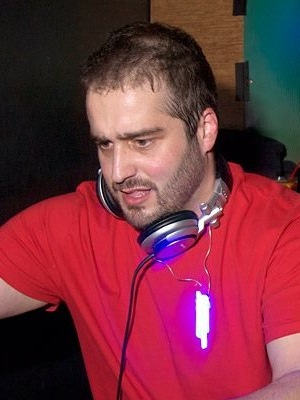
Daft Punk collaborated with Todd Edwards, using his "cut-up" production style in the song.

Thomas Bangalter and Guy-Manuel de Homem-Christo of Daft Punk had met Todd Edwards prior to releasing their 1997 debut album, Homework. They wanted to collaborate with Edwards but struggled to convince him due to their then-unknown status. While the collaboration did not materialize, Daft Punk cited Edwards as an influence in their track "Teachers". They reconnected in 1999, meeting at Edwards' parents' house in New Jersey, where Edwards had his home studio.

After gathering potential samples, the three worked on the track, with Bangalter adjusting the samples to the same key. Edwards and Bangalter played the samples over a set drum loop while Homem-Christo provided verbal input. One of the samples, featuring the lyrics "Christopher Robin", resembled the words "face to face" and inspired the song's title. After recording the base of the track, Daft Punk flew Edwards to Paris twice to complete the work at Bangalter's home studio. During the second trip, they instructed him to sing with a raspier tone, "like the guy from Foreigner." The completed song contains Edwards' first two vocal takes, layered to create a doubling effect. Bangalter commented, "Todd Edwards sings sometimes, but not like that. I think we were all very excited and surprised by the way he could sing this song."

The duo expressed gratitude for collaborating with Edwards, noting that it allowed them to branch out creatively. They remarked that "we are free to explore other areas. It will be interesting to see what we'll do next. Now we can work with other people." They would later reunite with Edwards for the song "Fragments of Time", from their 2013 album Random Access Memories.

== Composition ==
"Face to Face" is composed in a common time of 4/4, with a tempo of 118 BPM in the key of G-sharp minor. As the album was originally conceived to accompany a live-action film, with "Face to Face" being intended for a battle scene, Edwards aimed to write lyrics that could resonate whether sung to another person, one's own reflection, or to God. According to Bangalter, the preceding track "Short Circuit" symbolized shutdown, with "Face to Face" symbolizing awakening thereafter to face reality.

=== Samples ===
The song features Edwards' distinctive "cut-up" production style, which involves editing samples and creating spaces between segments. Edwards recalled that he and Daft Punk curated 70 samples each to incorporate into the song. The song contains 20 known samples, which are uncredited in the Discovery liner notes. Most of the samples remained unknown for decades after its release. Early samples identified in the track included Electric Light Orchestra's "Evil Woman" and "Can't Get It Out of My Head", The Alan Parsons Project's "Old and Wise", and Loggins and Messina's "House At Pooh Corner". In 2016, Edwards released a video where he showed some of the isolated samples.

In late 2021, a user on a sample-related Discord server identified one of the unknown samples, "South City Midnight Lady" by The Doobie Brothers, using Google Assistant's 'hum to search' option. Another user utilized BlueStacks along with Google Assistant to input audio directly, successfully identifying the sample "Sometimes a Love Goes Wrong" by Carrie Lucas. In June 2023, Edwards hosted a TikTok livestream where he revealed a floppy disk containing all the samples gathered for the track. He explained that "Face to Face" primarily utilized folk music and soft rock samples because most of the songs came from his personal sample library. Later discoveries revealed additional samples in the track, including songs by Poco ("Faith in the Families"), Boz Scaggs ("You Got Some Imagination"), and Herbie Mann ("Jisco Dazz"), with Mann's song serving as the drum sample in the track. Later that month, a member of the server discovered the final unidentified sample from the song, identifying it as "Nothing Like Love" by Rockie Robbins.

== Release and reception ==
"Face to Face" was released as a limited promotional single in 2003, over 2 years after its inclusion on Discovery. It reached number one on the Billboard Dance Club Songs on 20 March 2004, before being overtaken by Britney Spears's "Toxic" the following week. The song stayed on the chart for a total of 16 weeks. Edwards received a framed Gold record for his contributions because of the song's inclusion in Discovery. Edwards himself was unaware that the single reached number one due to a strained relationship with his manager.

The song has been featured in several lists highlighting the top singles by Daft Punk and Todd Edwards. Mixmag placed it 30th among their top 33 songs, while Los Angeles Times ranked the song as the fourth greatest moment from the duo. In reviews of the album, John Bush of AllMusic described "Face to Face" as "[twisting Edwards'] trademarked split-second samples and fully fragmented vision of garage into a dance-pop hit that could've easily stormed the charts in 1987," while Stephen Dalton of NME described the song as "slice'n'dice Shannon-style clunk-funk."

=== Remix and cover versions ===
Daft Punk commissioned two official remixes of the track by Cosmo Vitelli and Demon, both included in the 2003 remix album Daft Club. Promotional 12" singles were released for those who pre-ordered the Daft Club album, and a CD single featuring Demon's remix of the song was released commercially. The remixes were unfavorably reviewed, with Nick Sylvester of Pitchfork criticizing Cosmo Vitelli for discarding the original's "charming big-beat start/stops and jittery cut-ups" and likening the Demon remix to a "90s Detroit acidhouse treatment processed through the Oakenfold 'through the matrix' machine". Ben Cardey of Vice commented that the Cosmo Vitelli remix, along with other tracks on the remix album, suffered from having producers unfamiliar to listeners. Dave Simpson of The Guardian said that the Cosmo Vitelli remix put "a spectral sheen on the track's blue-eyed soul." Edwards created his own unofficial remix in 2003 featuring rerecorded vocals from himself, which he plays and sings along to in his live shows to this day.

==== Nickster's remix ====
In February 2024, producer Nickster covered the track using newer samples from the period of 1998 to 2012, including songs by Radiohead, Boards of Canada, LCD Soundsystem, MGMT, Carly Rae Jepsen, Lady Gaga, Estelle, and System of a Down. Viewers of the video praised Nickster's production skills and commended him for using different songs to create the same vibe as the original. DJ Mag described it as a "masterclass is [sic] sample chopping that also highlights the lengths to which Daft Punk went in the original track to create a new melody from old snippets."

== Music video ==
"Face to Face" is featured in the 2003 animated film Interstella 5555: The 5tory of the 5ecret 5tar 5ystem, which serves as a visual realization of Discovery. The film was written by Daft Punk in collaboration with Cédric Hervet and directed by Kazuhisa Takenouchi, Hirotoshi Rissen, and Daisuke Nishio under the visual supervision of Leiji Matsumoto. The "Face to Face" segment follows the aftermath of the extraterrestrial pop band The Crescendolls seemingly subduing the villain, Earl de Darkwood, at his manor. Construction crews unearth the space vessel piloted by Shep, who had rescued the band from enslavement and brainwashing by Darkwood, who had disguised himself as their manager. Police investigate the record company the band had been signed to and search every part of Darkwood Manor. A news report depicts montage scenes of an operation to send The Crescendolls back to their home planet using Shep's ship. The report also explains the situation, revealing that The Crescendolls were not the only group to have experienced this. One of the band members, Octave, is shown in a hospital, recovering from an earlier altercation with security guards at the record company. As the band prepares to leave Earth, people wave goodbye to them from all over the world.

== Track listing ==
12" Maxi (Virgin 7087 6 18299 1 4)
No.	Title	Length
1.	"Face to Face"	3:58
2.	"Face to Face" (Demon remix)	6:58
3.	"Face to Face" (Cosmo Vitelli remix)	4:53
Total length:		15:49

== Credits and personnel ==
Credits for "Face to Face" adapted from the 12" Maxi single liner notes.

- Thomas Bangalter – production, writing
- Guy-Manuel de Homem-Christo – production, writing
- Todd Imperatrice – production, vocals

== Charts ==
Chart (2004)	Peak position
US Dance Club Songs (Billboard)	1

== See also ==
- List of Billboard Hot Dance Club Play and Dance Singles Sales number ones of 2004
