= Daft Punk Unchained =

2015 Anglo-French documentary film

- Genre: Documentary
- Written by: Marina Rozenman; Hervé Martin-Delpierre
- Directed by: Hervé Martin-Delpierre
- Starring: Guy-Manuel de Homem-Christo; Thomas Bangalter
- Countries of origin: France; United Kingdom
- Original languages: French; English

Production
- Producer: Patrice Gellé
- Running time: 60 minutes

Original release
- Network: BBC; Canal+
- Release: 24 June 2015 (France); 19 February 2016 (UK)

Daft Punk Unchained is an Anglo-French documentary film that was televised on 24 June 2015 in France and on 9 February 2016 in the United Kingdom. It documents the rise to fame and personal lives of Daft Punk members Guy-Manuel de Homem-Christo and Thomas Bangalter and their pioneering influence on electronic music. The film runs chronologically through the artists' early years before their foundation of Daft Punk, up to the release of their 2013 album Random Access Memories and performance at the 56th Annual Grammy Awards, in which they won five Grammy Awards.

The documentary combines rare archive footage with interviews with Daft Punk's closest collaborators, including Pharrell Williams, Giorgio Moroder, Nile Rodgers, Skrillex, Kanye West and Michel Gondry. No new footage of Daft Punk was shot for the documentary.
