= Aerodynamic (instrumental) =

2001 song by Daft Punk

Single by Daft Punk

from the album Discovery
- B-side: "Digital Love"; "Aerodynamite"
- Released: 28 March 2001
- Recorded: 1999–2000
- Genre: French house; electronic rock; baroque pop
- Length: 3:46
- Label: Virgin
- Songwriters: Thomas Bangalter; Guy-Manuel de Homem-Christo; Joni Sledge
- Producer: Daft Punk

Daft Punk singles chronology
"One More Time" (2000)	"Aerodynamic" (2001)	"Digital Love" (2001)

Audio sample
- file; help

Music video
- "Aerodynamic" on YouTube

"Aerodynamic" is an instrumental track by French duo Daft Punk, featuring a prominent synthesiser (made to sound like a guitar with the help of distortion pedals) solo. The track was released on 28 March 2001 as the second single from the Discovery album. "Aerodynamic" hit the U.S. dance charts through club play as the B-side to "Digital Love".

== Composition ==
Guy-Manuel de Homem-Christo once described the Discovery album as "A mix between the past and the future, maybe the present." Thomas Bangalter also elaborated in a 2001 interview that "A lot of house music today just uses samples from disco records of the '70s and '80s... While we might have some disco influences, we decided to go further and bring in all the elements of music that we liked as children, whether it's disco, electro, heavy metal, rock, or classical."

This is reflected in the structure of "Aerodynamic", which is said to build up a funk groove, featuring a sample of "Il Macquillage Lady" by Sister Sledge from their 1982 album The Sisters. "Aerodynamic" halts for a solo consisting of "metallic, two-hand tapping on electric guitar", combines the two styles, and ends with a separate "spacier" electronic segment. The solo elements were described playfully as "impossible, ridiculous Yngwie guitar arpeggios", which reflect the fast arpeggiation common with violin parts in classical music. Bangalter acknowledged that "Some people might think that the guitar solos on 'Aerodynamic' are in bad taste, but for us, it's all about being true to ourselves and not caring what other people would think. We really tried to include most of the things we liked as kids, and bring that sense of fun to it." He also commented that the end of the track "is completely baroque music, a classical composition we put into synthetic form."

== Release ==
The "Aerodynamic" single contained a B-side remix titled "Aerodynamite". Another remix of "Aerodynamic" features Detroit-based hip-hop group Slum Village. The creation of the Slum Village remix resulted after Slum Village used an uncredited sample of Bangalter's "Extra Dry" in their song "Raise It Up". Instead of asking for compensation for using the sample, Pedro Winter suggested to Daft Punk that they ask Slum Village to remix one of their tracks. Both "Aerodynamite" and the Slum Village remix were later included on the album Daft Club. The album also contains a longer remix of "Aerodynamic", featuring elements of "One More Time". A live version coupled with "One More Time" is featured on the album Alive 2007.

== Music video ==
The video was released in 2001 and contained scenes that would later be featured in the 2003 anime film Interstella 5555. It shows an army of humanoid troopers sedating the audience with gas, and poisoning and kidnapping the alien band members from the "One More Time" video. The guitarist (later revealed to be named Arpegius) escapes and runs away from the troopers, but one of the troopers shoots him with a tranquilizer dart. The troopers gather the members in pods, and the pods get beamed up to a vessel. The audience wakes up confused and then the vessel flies away.

== Legacy ==
The song was used in the French film L'Auberge espagnole. "Aerodynamic" was also performed by Myleene Klass on piano for a Pantene commercial. and was featured in several episodes of MTV programs Pimp my Ride, Date My Mom, Quiero mis quinces and Next.

"Aerodynamic" was sampled for the Wiley song "Summertime" from his 2008 album See Clear Now. Nicky Romero released a remix of "Aerodynamic" in 2011. The song was also remixed for the 2012 video game Kinect Star Wars.

== Track listing ==
CD-Maxi (Virgin 8974762)
No.	Title	Length
1.	"Aerodynamic"	3:45
2.	"Aerodynamite"	7:46
Total length:		11:31

== Charts ==
Weekly chart performance for "Aerodynamic"
Chart (2001)	Peak position
Australia (ARIA) (Note: "Aerodynamic" charted as a double A-side with "Digital Love" in Australia.)	67
Belgium (Ultratop 50 Flanders)	42
Belgium (Ultratop 50 Wallonia)	24
Czech Republic Airplay (ČNS IFPI)	46
Finland (Suomen virallinen lista)	19
France (SNEP)	34
Italy (FIMI)	32
Netherlands (Single Top 100)	73
Switzerland (Schweizer Hitparade)	46
UK Singles (Official Charts)	97
