= Harder, Better, Faster, Stronger =

2001 song by Daft Punk

Single by Daft Punk

from the album Discovery
- Released: 13 October 2001
- Genre: French house; nu-disco; electro
- Length: 3:45
- Label: Virgin
- Songwriters: Thomas Bangalter; Guy-Manuel de Homem-Christo; Edwin Birdsong
- Producer: Daft Punk

Daft Punk singles chronology
"Digital Love" (2001)	"Harder, Better, Faster, Stronger" (2001)	"Face to Face" (2003)

Audio sample
- Daft Punk – "Harder Better Faster Stronger" (album version): file; help

Music video
- "Harder, Better, Faster, Stronger" on YouTube

"Harder, Better, Faster, Stronger (Alive 2007)"

Single by Daft Punk

from the album Alive 2007
- Released: 15 October 2007
- Recorded: 14 June 2007
- Genre: House
- Length: 4:43
- Label: Virgin
- Songwriters: Thomas Bangalter; Guy-Manuel de Homem-Christo; Edwin Birdsong
- Producer: Daft Punk

Daft Punk singles chronology
"The Prime Time of Your Life" (2006)	"Harder, Better, Faster, Stronger (Alive 2007)" (2007)	"Derezzed" (2010)

Music video
- "Harder, Better, Faster, Stronger" (Alive 2007) on YouTube

"Harder, Better, Faster, Stronger" is a song by Daft Punk, released on 13 October 2001 as the fourth single from their second studio album Discovery. A live version of "Harder, Better, Faster, Stronger" was released as a single from the album Alive 2007 on 15 October 2007. This version won a Grammy Award for Best Dance Recording in 2009. In October 2011, NME placed it at number 132 on its list "150 Best Tracks of the Past 15 Years".

== Composition ==
A French house, nu-disco and electro song, "Harder, Better, Faster, Stronger" is built around a "bouncy" keyboard riff sampled from the 1979 track "Cola Bottle Baby" by the funk musician Edwin Birdsong. In 2016, Birdsong said, "I recorded ['Cola Bottle Baby'] 30 years ago, and here come some guys from France. I asked them, 'Where did you find the music?' And they said, 'I was going through bins and it popped out.' ... I'm blessed and I continue to be blessed by opening my arms to God every day." The track's vocals are vocoded. It is set in the key of F♯ minor.

== Reception ==
In 2016, Daniel Jeakins wrote for HuffPost: "For all the gifts electronic deities Daft Punk have bestowed upon pop music, no track feels quite as iconic or ingenious as 'Harder Better Faster Stronger' ... Fifteen years on from its release and it's hard to think of a dance track that's as prominent in popular culture or influential to modern electronic music." In 2021, Billboard ranked the song number two on its list of the 20 greatest Daft Punk songs.

== Music video ==
The animated music video for "Harder, Better, Faster, Stronger" was produced by Daft Punk and directed by Kazuhisa Takenouchi, director for Toei Animation, under the supervision of Leiji Matsumoto. It features the four alien characters shown on the single cover in a vast electronic facility. There, they are cosmetically changed by various machines to resemble humans, and have their memories replaced. The video was first released as an individual episode in promotion for the single release. It later appeared as a scene in the feature film Interstella 5555: The 5tory of the 5ecret 5tar 5ystem.

A music video for the live version of "Harder, Better, Faster, Stronger" was directed by Olivier Gondry. It contains footage shot by the audience on 250 cameras at Daft Punk's Brooklyn performance in KeySpan Park (now called Maimonides Park) in Coney Island. The video was inspired by the Beastie Boys concert film Awesome; I Fuckin' Shot That!. The video had its world premiere online on 26 October 2007, at Webcastr.

== Live performances ==
A live version of "Harder, Better, Faster, Stronger" was recorded at Bercy in Paris from 14 June 2007. It was released as a download single on 15 October 2007, for the live album Alive 2007. The track also contains a part of the "Television Rules the Nation / Crescendolls" segment of the Bercy performance that features elements of the songs "Around the World", "Steam Machine", and "Television Rules the Nation". This version of the song won the Grammy Award for Best Dance Recording at the 51st Grammy Awards.

== Other versions ==
Diplo released a remix of "Harder, Better, Faster, Stronger" titled "Work Is Never Over". It appeared in his compilation album Decent Work for Decent Pay. The title of the song was also parodied in an episode of The Cleveland Show called "Harder, Better, Faster, Browner", which was a part of season two. Neil Cicierega used the "Harder, Better, Faster, Stronger" instrumental, along with Smash Mouth's songs "Walkin' on the Sun" and "All Star", for the mashup "Daft Mouth" as part of Cicierega's Mouth Sounds album.

Philippe Uminski of the band Circus released a cover version of "Harder, Better, Faster, Stronger" in 2004. Mike Tompkins released an a cappella version of the song in May 2012.

Kanye West's song "Stronger" from the album Graduation prominently features a sample of "Harder, Better, Faster, Stronger". Two actors who wore the robotic Daft Punk costumes in the film Daft Punk's Electroma appear in the music video for "Stronger". It was performed live at the 50th Annual Grammy Awards with Daft Punk in their trademark pyramid while West was on stage rapping. Daft Punk member Guy-Manuel de Homem-Christo said that "Stronger" was "not a collaboration in the studio, but the vibe of the music we do separately connected in what [West] did with the song". He later clarified that the live version was "truly a collaboration from the start. We really did it all hand in hand."

== Usage in media ==
"Harder, Better, Faster, Stronger" is featured in the 2007 YouTube viral video Daft Hands, which shows a pair of hands moving to reveal each word of the song's lyrics. The video was performed by Austin Hall, who later appeared on The Ellen DeGeneres Show. In 2010, Time magazine included Daft Hands in a list of "YouTube's 50 Best Videos". The video inspired numerous remakes including the variant Daft Bodies; both videos, along with other viral videos, were referenced in Weezer's "Pork and Beans" music video. It also appeared in the trailers for Ralph Breaks the Internet (2018) and the 2025 film adaptation of Dog Man.

== Track listing ==
CD Maxi-Single (Virgin 7243 8979682 7)
No.	Title	Music	Length
1.	"Harder, Better, Faster, Stronger"		3:43
2.	"Harder, Better, Faster, Stronger" (Breakers Break remix)	Dominique Torti	4:38
3.	"Harder, Better, Faster, Stronger" (The Neptunes remix)		5:12
4.	"Harder, Better, Faster, Stronger" (Pete Heller's stylus mix)		9:14
Total length:			22:47

CD Single – Alive 2007 version (5 099951 928803)
No.	Title	Length
1.	"Harder, Better, Faster, Stronger (Alive 2007)" (radio edit)	3:34
2.	"Harder, Better, Faster, Stronger (Alive 2007)" (extended)	4:43
3.	"Harder, Better, Faster, Stronger (Alive 2007)" (video)	3:25
Total length:		11:42

== Charts ==
=== Original version ===
Chart (2001–02)	Peak position
Belgium (Ultratip Bubbling Under Flanders)	8
Belgium (Ultratop 50 Wallonia)	38
France (SNEP)	17
Ireland (IRMA)	38
Switzerland (Schweizer Hitparade)	70
UK Singles (Official Charts)	25
UK Dance (Official Charts)	3
US Dance Club Songs (Billboard)	3

Chart (2021)	Peak position
US Hot Dance/Electronic Songs (Billboard)	11
Hungary (Single Top 40)	37

=== 2007 live version ===
==== Weekly charts ====
Chart (2007–2008)	Peak position
Australia (ARIA)	43
Austria (Ö3 Austria Top 40)	58
Belgium (Ultratop 50 Flanders)	16
Belgium (Ultratop 50 Wallonia)	17
France (SNEP)	19
Switzerland (Schweizer Hitparade)	50

==== Year-end charts ====
Chart (2008)	Position
Belgium (Ultratop 50 Flanders)	86
Belgium (Ultratop 50 Wallonia)	72

== Certifications ==
Region	Certification	Certified units/sales
Denmark (IFPI Danmark)	Gold	45,000^{‡}
New Zealand (RMNZ)	Platinum	30,000^{‡}
United Kingdom (BPI)	Platinum	600,000^{‡}
^{‡} Sales+streaming figures based on certification alone.
