= Edwin Birdsong =

American musician (1941–2019)

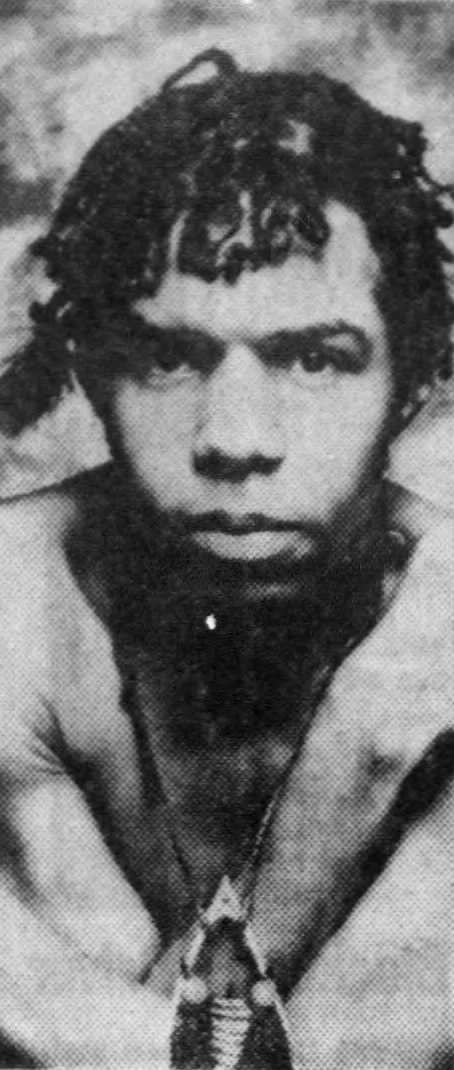
- Birdsong c. 1971

Background information
- Born: Edwin L. Birdsong; August 22, 1941; Los Angeles, California, U.S.
- Died: January 21, 2019 (aged 77) Inglewood, California, U.S.
- Genres: Funk; soul; jazz
- Occupations: Singer; songwriter; record producer; musician
- Instruments: Vocals; keyboards; organ
- Years active: 1971–2019
- Labels: Polydor; Bamboo; Philadelphia International
- Website: edwinbirdsong.com

Edwin L. Birdsong (August 22, 1941 – January 21, 2019) was an American keyboardist and organist, known in the 1970s and 1980s for his experimental funk/disco music. Birdsong did not achieve much chart success, but developed a strong fan base. Birdsong has also been sampled by other artists many times, most famously by Daft Punk who sampled "Cola Bottle Baby" in "Harder, Better, Faster, Stronger", and Gang Starr who sampled his single "Rapper Dapper Snapper" for their song "Skills".

== Biography ==
Birdsong was the son of a minister and grew up in a strict fundamentalist environment. He joined the Los Angeles Community Choir for a period before serving in the army during the Vietnam War era. While in the army, he was stationed in Germany. He went on to play in clubs in Germany, and then moved to New York City to pursue his music career. There he headed a jazz and blues trio but experienced little success. While in New York he attended the Manhattan School of Music as well as Juilliard as a composition major.

In 1971 he signed a record deal with Polydor. Under Polydor, he issued his first two full-length albums, What It Is and Supernatural. Birdsong then issued one album for Bamboo, Dance of Survival, in 1975, and recorded Edwin Birdsong for Philadelphia International in 1979, which included the single "Phiss-Phizz". Birdsong also worked extensively with Roy Ayers, co-producing three of his albums and writing "Running Away" and "Freaky Deaky" with him.

Birdsong slowly stopped making his own music but carried on playing session work for many well known artists including Stevie Wonder.

Birdsong served as a mentor early in the career of hip-hop artist/producer Funkghost.

== Discography ==
=== Albums ===
- What It Is (1971, Polydor)
- Supernatural (1973, Polydor)
- Dance of Survival (1975, Bam-Boo)
- Edwin Birdsong (1979, Philadelphia International)
- Funtaztik (1981, Salsoul)

=== Singles ===
Year	Song	US R&B
1973	"Rising Sign"	—
1973	"Turn Around Hate (Communicate)"	—
1975	"Dance of Survival"	—
1978	"Kunta Dance"	—
1979	"Phiss-Phizz"	—
1979	"Cola Bottle Baby"	—
1979	"Lollipop" / "Freaky Deaky Sities"	—
1980	"Rapper Dapper Snapper"	65
1981	"Funtaztik"	—
1982	"She's Wrapped Too Tight (She's a Button Buster)"	55
1984	"Perfect Love'n"	—
1985	"Too Good to Go (When You Get It Right)"	—
1985	"Son of a Rapper Dapper Snapper"	—
1986	"For My Self"	—
1987	"Percolator"	—
"—" denotes releases that did not chart.
