= Alive 1997 =

Live album by Daft Punk
- Released: 1 October 2001
- Recorded: 8 November 1997
- Venues: Que Club (Birmingham, England)
- Genre: House
- Length: 45:33
- Label: Virgin
- Producers: Thomas Bangalter; Guy-Manuel de Homem-Christo

Daft Punk chronology
| Discovery (2001) | Alive 1997 (2001) | Daft Club (2003) |

Professional ratings
Review scores
| Source | Rating |
|---|---|
| AllMusic | 4.5/5 stars |
| Robert Christgau | (dud) |
| NME | 8/10 |
| Q | 3/5 stars |
| The Rolling Stone Album Guide | 1.5/5 stars |
| Sputnikmusic | 4.5/5 stars |
| Uncut | 3.5/5 stars |

Alive 1997 is the first live album by French electronic music duo Daft Punk, released on 1 October 2001 by Virgin Records. It contains a 45-minute excerpt of a live performance recorded during Daftendirektour at Birmingham's Que Club on 8 November 1997. It was later followed by Alive 2007.

The album was generally positively received by critics. Alive 1997 peaked at number 25 on the French Albums Chart.

== Background ==
The album was initially released online as part of the Daft Club service. Early pressings of the Daft Punk album Discovery included a card that granted access to the Daft Club website, which featured remixes and the live recording. The Daft Club service ended in 2003. The performance at Birmingham's Que Club was considered by Daft Punk to be one of their favorite live sets at the time of its release.

The live performance contains elements of what would later become the track "Short Circuit" featured in Discovery.

Alive 1997 contains the 45-minute excerpt as a continuous track. The physical releases contain no tracklisting. The CD and vinyl packaging included a set of Daft Punk stickers. The layout for the album was done by Åbäke, and the photography by Serge Paulet. In 2022, the album was reissued for the 25th anniversary of Homework. In 2026, a YouTube live stream was broadcast for the album's 25th anniversary.

== Critical reception ==
The reception to Alive 1997 was generally positive upon release. John Bush of AllMusic noted how "radically different" the live versions of Daft Punk's tracks are compared to the originals, and that the release accurately captured the energy of the stage show. Fiona Reid of Hot Press felt that the audible audience enhanced the record, making it reminiscent to sound effects heard in Homework. An NME review called Alive 1997 "an immaculately executed product", expressing that it was preferred over the "sleek sophistication" of Discovery. Sputnikmusic also felt that it was superior to the duo's later live album Alive 2007, in particular highlighting the singular continuous flow of the 1997 performance. Q called Alive 1997 "45 minutes of breathless electronic excitement" while Uncut wrote that it "has a shrill rawness that vividly captures a night of sweat-stained gymnastics".

== Personnel ==
Adapted from the Alive 1997 liner notes.

- Daft Punk – production, writing
- Serge Paulet – photography
- Åbäke – layout
- Janvier – photo retouching

== Charts ==
Chart performance for Alive 1997
| Chart (2001) | Peak position |
|---|---|
| French Albums (SNEP) | 25 |

| Chart (2021) | Peak position |
|---|---|
| Belgian Albums (Ultratop Wallonia) | 157 |

| Chart (2022) | Peak position |
|---|---|
| Belgian Albums (Ultratop Flanders) | 97 |
| Scottish Albums (Official Charts) | 29 |
| UK Independent Albums (Official Charts) | 20 |
