= Digital Love (Daft Punk song) =

2001 song by Daft Punk

Single by Daft Punk

from the album Discovery
- B-side: "Digital Dub"; "Aerodynamic"
- Released: 11 June 2001
- Genre: Synth-pop
- Length: 4:58; 3:58 (radio edit)
- Label: Virgin
- Songwriters: Thomas Bangalter; Guy-Manuel de Homem-Christo; Carlos Sosa; George Duke
- Producers: Thomas Bangalter; Guy-Manuel de Homem-Christo

Daft Punk singles chronology
"Aerodynamic" (2001)	"Digital Love" (2001)	"Harder, Better, Faster, Stronger" (2001)

Audio sample
- Daft Punk – "Digital Love": file; help

Music video
- "Digital Love" on YouTube

"Digital Love" is a song by French electronic music duo Daft Punk, released as the third single from their second album, Discovery, on 11 June 2001. It reached number 33 in France, number 28 in Italy, and number 14 in the UK. It appears in the 2003 film Interstella 5555: The 5tory of the 5ecret 5tar 5ystem.

== Composition ==
"Digital Love" features a sample of the 1979 song "I Love You More" by George Duke. The Daft Punk collaborator Chilly Gonzales said the sample contains an unresolved chord progression that contributes to the sense of longing and desire. Daft Punk adapted it into an electronic pop song about unspoken love, with lyrics by DJ Sneak and vocals by Daft Punk.

For the bridge, Daft Punk used a Wurlitzer electronic piano to create a sound they likened to the band Supertramp. The Daft Punk member Thomas Bangalter said that the guitar solo was created using a mixture of elements, aided by sequencers: "No one plays solos in their songs anymore, but we wanted to include some on the album."

== Music video ==
The video was released in 2001 and was later included in the 2003 anime film Interstella 5555: The 5tory of the 5ecret 5tar 5ystem.

Following the events that occurred in the "Aerodynamic" video, the alien planet's security guards regain enough consciousness to send a distress signal to a distant astronaut named Shep. At first, Shep is seen cleaning his spaceship's exterior while singing along with the song's lyrics. After completing the task, he returns to the ship and lounges around in his bedroom, filled with memorabilia of the alien band. He drifts into a daydream where he dances with his crush, the band's female bass player (later named Stella), in mid-air.

Shep's dream comes to an abrupt halt when he is awakened by the distress signal sent to him. To his horror, he learns of the band's abduction and current state of the alien planet, immediately pursuing after the kidnappers. After the chase leads through a warp hole, the kidnappers make a safe landing with the unconscious alien band at their base on Earth, with Shep crash-landing into a nearby forest, temporarily rendering him unconscious. The kidnappers take the sedated captives into the base's lab for the events that take place in the "Harder, Better, Faster, Stronger" video.

== Reception ==
"Digital Love" charted backed with "Aerodynamic" due to equal club play. It charted at number 14 on the UK singles chart and reached number nine on the Hot Dance Music/Club Play chart in the United States. It also reached number 67 in Australia, promoted along with its B-side, "Aerodynamic".

"Digital Love" was featured in a GAP television advertisement. It featured both members of Daft Punk wearing their robotic helmets and gloves with GAP denim shirts and jeans. They appeared dancing with Juliette Lewis. The Daft Punk member Guy-Manuel de Homem-Christo said: "It looks really simple to do, but when you're on a step with the crew, it's really not, even though the choreographer was really nice."

== Track listings ==
French limited-edition 7-inch single
No.	Title	Length
1.	"Digital Love" (radio edit)	3:59
2.	"Digital Dub" (radio edit)	3:59
Total length:		7:58

UK and European CD single, UK cassette single
No.	Title	Length
1.	"Digital Love" (radio edit)	3:59
2.	"Digital Love" (album version)	4:58
3.	"Digital Love" (digital dub)	4:58
Total length:		13:55

UK 12-inch single
No.	Title	Length
1.	"Digital Love"	4:58
2.	"Digital Dub"	4:58
Total length:		9:56

Australian CD single
No.	Title	Length
1.	"Digital Love" (radio edit)	3:59
2.	"Digital Love" (album version)	4:58
3.	"Digital Love" (digital dub)	4:58
4.	"Aerodynamite"	7:47
Total length:		21:42

Japanese CD EP
No.	Title	Length
1.	"Digital Love" (radio edit)	3:59
2.	"Digital Love" (album version)	4:59
3.	"Digital Dub"	5:00
4.	"Aerodynamic"	3:45
5.	"Aerodynamite"	7:47
Total length:		25:30

== Charts ==
2001 weekly chart performance for "Digital Love"
Chart (2001)	Peak position
Australia (ARIA) with "Aerodynamic"	67
Belgium (Ultratip Bubbling Under Flanders)	2
Belgium (Ultratop 50 Wallonia)	38
Europe (Eurochart Hot 100)	30
France (SNEP)	33
Germany (GfK)	85
Ireland (IRMA)	35
Ireland Dance (IRMA)	4
Italy (FIMI)	28
Scottish Singles Sales (Official Charts)	16
Switzerland (Schweizer Hitparade)	60
UK Singles (Official Charts)	14
UK Dance (Official Charts)	8
US Dance Club Songs (Billboard)	9

2021 weekly chart performance for "Digital Love"
Chart (2021)	Peak position
US Hot Dance/Electronic Songs (Billboard)	23

== Certifications ==
Certifications for "Digital Love"
Region	Certification	Certified units/sales
United Kingdom (BPI)	Silver	200,000^{‡}
^{‡} Sales+streaming figures based on certification alone.

== Release history ==
Release dates and formats for "Digital Love"
Region	Date	Format(s)	Label(s)	Ref(s).
United Kingdom	11 June 2001	12-inch vinyl; CD; cassette	Virgin	
Japan	16 June 2001	CD	Virgin	
Australia	18 June 2001	CD	Virgin	
