= Something About Us (Daft Punk song) =

2003 single by Daft Punk

Single by Daft Punk

from the album Discovery
- Released: 14 November 2003
- Genre: Downtempo
- Length: 3:53
- Label: Virgin
- Songwriters: Thomas Bangalter; Guy-Manuel de Homem-Christo
- Producer: Daft Punk

Daft Punk singles chronology
"Face to Face" (2003)	"Something About Us" (2003)	"Robot Rock" (2005)

Music video
- "Something About Us" on YouTube

"Something About Us" is a song by the French electronic music duo Daft Punk. It was released as the ninth single from the 2001 album Discovery as a promotion for their 2003 animated feature film Interstella 5555: The 5tory of the 5ecret 5tar 5ystem. The song reached number 93 on the SNEP chart ranking.

== Music video ==
There are two music videos for "Something About Us". The first video is a scene from Interstella 5555. After escaping their kidnapper, two members of the alien band The Crescendolls (drummer Baryl and bass player Stella) enter a waiting taxicab driven by keyboardist Octave. They drive to a warehouse where their rescuer, Shep, is laying on the floor bleeding to death, as a result of being shot by a laser during an earlier scene in the film. Shep raises his injured arm out to his crush Stella. She takes it and experiences a dream sequence that reveals Shep's feelings for her. When they come back, Shep then reveals The Crescendolls' true identities. The band expresses their gratitude as Shep dies.

The second music video is a compilation of clips featuring Shep and Stella. This version was released to promote the single version of "Something About Us".

== Track listing ==
CD maxi single – enhanced (Virgin 5476450)
No.	Title	Length
1.	"Something About Us" (Love Theme from Interstella 5555)	2:15
2.	"Veridis Quo"	5:45
3.	"Voyager" (Dominique Torti's Wild Style Edit)	6:32
4.	"Something About Us"	3:53
Total length:		18:25

== Chart positions ==
Chart (2003)	Peak position
France (SNEP)	93
UK Singles (Official Charts Company)	138
