= Daft Punk =

French electronic music duo (1993–2021)

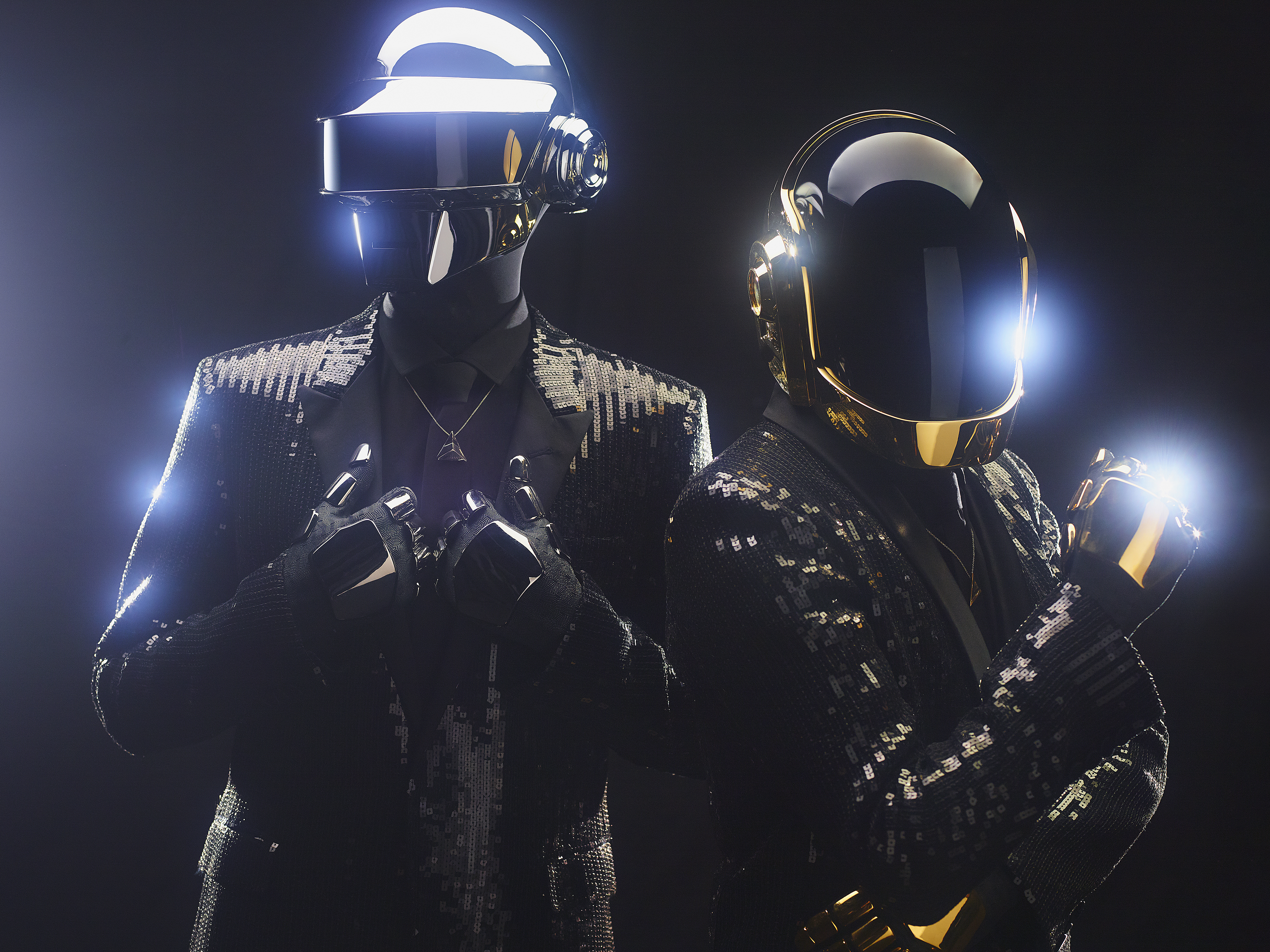
- From left: Thomas Bangalter and Guy-Manuel de Homem-Christo in 2013

Background information
- Origin: Paris, France
- Genres: French house; electronic; dance; disco
- Works: Discography; songs
- Years active: 1993–2021
- Labels: Daft Life; Soma; Virgin; Parlophone; Warner; ADA France; Walt Disney; Columbia
- Spinoffs: Le Knight Club; Stardust; Together; Crydajam
- Spinoff of: Darlin'
- Past members: Thomas Bangalter; Guy-Manuel de Homem-Christo
- Website: daftpunk.com
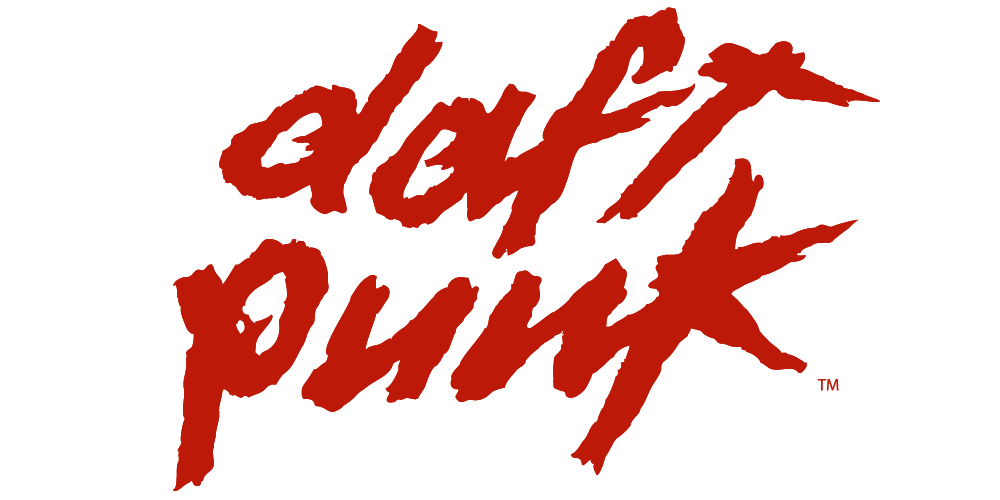

Daft Punk were a French electronic music duo formed in 1993 in Paris by Thomas Bangalter and Guy-Manuel de Homem-Christo. They achieved popularity in the late 1990s as part of the French house movement, combining elements of house, funk, disco, techno and rock. They are regarded as one of the most influential acts in electronic dance music (EDM).

Daft Punk formed after their previous group, the indie rock band Darlin', disbanded. They were managed from 1996 to 2008 by Pedro Winter, the head of Ed Banger Records. Their debut album, Homework, was released by Virgin Records in 1997 to generally positive reviews, backed by the singles "Around the World" and "Da Funk". Alive 1997, a live album that was recorded in November 1997 in Birmingham, was released four years later in 2001. Between 1999 and 2021, Daft Punk assumed robot personas for their rare public and media appearances, with helmets, outfits and gloves to disguise their identities; Bangalter took on a silver-helmet, while Homem-Christo wore gold. Daft Punk's second album, Discovery (2001), earned acclaim and further success, with the hit singles "One More Time", "Digital Love" and "Harder, Better, Faster, Stronger". It became the basis for an animated film, Interstella 5555: The 5tory of the 5ecret 5tar 5ystem (2003), supervised by the Japanese artist Leiji Matsumoto. Bangalter found success outside of Daft Punk as part of the trio Stardust, most notably for their only hit song "Music Sounds Better with You" (1998).

Daft Punk's third album, Human After All (2005), received mixed reviews, though the singles "Robot Rock" and "Technologic" were successful in the United Kingdom. Daft Punk directed an avant-garde science-fiction film, Electroma, released in 2006. They toured throughout 2006 and 2007 and released the live album Alive 2007, which won a Grammy Award for Best Electronic/Dance Album; the tour is credited for broadening the appeal of dance music in North America. Daft Punk composed the score for the 2010 film Tron: Legacy. In 2013, Daft Punk left Virgin for Columbia Records and released their fourth and final album, Random Access Memories, to great acclaim. The lead single, the Pharrell Williams and Nile Rodgers-featured "Get Lucky", reached the top 10 in the charts of 27 countries, and was one of the most recognisable songs of the 2010s. Random Access Memories won five Grammy Awards in 2014, including Album of the Year and Record of the Year for "Get Lucky".

In 2016, Daft Punk gained their only number one on the Billboard Hot 100 with "Starboy", a collaboration with the Weeknd. Rolling Stone ranked them the 12th-greatest musical duo of all time in 2015, and included Discovery and Random Access Memories on their 2020 list of the 500 Greatest Albums of All Time. Daft Punk announced their amicable split in 2021 after 28 years.

== History ==
=== 1987–1992: Early career and Darlin' ===
In 1987, while attending the Lycée Carnot secondary school in Paris, Guy-Manuel de Homem-Christo and Thomas Bangalter met. The two became friends and recorded demos with others from the school. In 1992, they formed the band Darlin', with Bangalter on bass, Homem-Christo on guitar, and Laurent Brancowitz on guitar and drums. The trio named themselves after the Beach Boys song "Darlin'", which they covered along with an original composition. Both tracks were released on a multi-artist EP called Shimmies in Super 8 under Duophonic Records, a label owned by the London-based band Stereolab, who invited Darlin' to open for shows in the United Kingdom.

Darlin' disbanded after around six months, having played two gigs and produced four songs. Bangalter described the project as "pretty average". Brancowitz formed another band, Phoenix. Bangalter and Homem-Christo formed Daft Punk, using electronic instruments purchased with money Bangalter received for his 18th birthday. A negative review of Darlin' was written by Melody Maker's Dave Jennings, who dubbed their music "a daft, punky thrash". The band found the review amusing, and the review prompted the duo's band name, Daft Punk. Homem-Christo said, "We struggled so long to find [the name] Darlin', and [this name] happened so quickly."

=== 1993–1996: First performances and singles ===
In September 1993, Daft Punk attended a rave at EuroDisney organised by the DJ Nicky Holloway, where they met Stuart Macmillan of Slam, the co-founder of the Scottish label Soma Quality Recordings. They gave him a demo tape, which formed the basis for Daft Punk's debut single, "The New Wave", a limited release in 1994. The single also contained the final mix of "The New Wave" called "Alive", which appeared on Daft Punk's first album.

Daft Punk returned to the studio in May 1995 to record "Da Funk". After it became their first commercially successful single, they hired a manager, Pedro Winter, who regularly promoted them and other artists at his Hype nightclubs. They signed with Virgin Records in September 1996 and made a deal to license tracks through their production company, Daft Trax. Bangalter said that while they received numerous offers from record labels, they wanted to wait and ensure that they did not lose creative control. He considered the deal with Virgin more akin to a partnership.

Throughout the mid-to-late 1990s, Daft Punk performed live at various events, without the costumes they later became known for. In 1996, they made their first performance in the United States, at an Even Furthur event in Wisconsin. In addition to live original performances, they performed in clubs using vinyl records from their collection. They were known for incorporating numerous styles of music into their DJ sets.

=== 1997–1999: Homework ===
Daft Punk released their debut album, Homework, on 20 January 1997. That February, the UK dance magazine Muzik published a Daft Punk cover feature and described Homework as "one of the most hyped debut albums in a long long time". According to The Village Voice, the album revived house music and departed from the Eurodance formula. The critic Alex Rayner wrote that it combined established club styles and the "burgeoning eclecticism" of big beat. In 1997, Daft Punk embarked on an international concert tour, Daftendirektour, using their home equipment for the live stage. On 25 May, they headlined the Tribal Gathering festival at Luton Hoo, England, with Orbital and Kraftwerk.

The most successful single from Homework was "Around the World". "Da Funk" was also included on the Saint film soundtrack. Daft Punk produced a series of music videos for Homework directed by Spike Jonze, Michel Gondry, Roman Coppola and Seb Janiak. The videos were collected in 1999 as D.A.F.T.: A Story About Dogs, Androids, Firemen and Tomatoes.

After the release of Homework, Bangalter and Homem-Christo created their own record labels, Roulé and Crydamoure, and released side projects and records by their friends. Homem-Christo released music as a member of Le Knight Club with Eric Chedeville. Bangalter released music as a member of Together with DJ Falcon and founded the group Stardust with Alan Braxe and Benjamin Diamond. In 1998, Stardust released their only song, the hit "Music Sounds Better With You".

=== 1999–2003: Discovery ===
In 1999, Bangalter and Homem-Christo debuted their distinctive robot costumes, with Bangalter wearing a silver robot helmet and gloves, and Homem-Christo wearing a gold robot helmet and gloves; they had previously worn Halloween masks or bags for promotional appearances or occasional interviews. The group told the press they were working in their studio at 9:09 am on 9 September 1999, when their sampler exploded. They had to undergo reconstructive surgery, and, regaining consciousness, they realised they had become robots. Bangalter later stated it was due to the 9999 bug, a precursor to the Y2K bug.

Daft Punk's second album, Discovery, was released on 12 March 2001. They said it was an attempt to reconnect with the playful, open-minded attitude associated with the "discovery" phase of childhood. The album reached No. 2 in the UK, and its lead single, "One More Time", was a hit. The singles "Digital Love" and "Harder, Better, Faster, Stronger" were also successful in the UK and on the US Dance Chart, and "Face to Face" hit number one on the US club play charts.

Discovery became widely successful, and subsequently saw the rise of a new generation of Daft Punk fans. Discovery was later named one of the best albums of the decade by publications including Pitchfork and Resident Advisor. In 2020, Rolling Stone included it at number 236 in its list of the "500 Greatest Albums of All Time". In 2021, Pitchfork cited Discovery as the centrepiece of Daft Punk's career, "an album that transcended the robots' club roots and rippled through the decades that followed".

Daft Punk partnered with the Japanese manga artist Leiji Matsumoto to create Interstella 5555, a feature-length animation set to Discovery. The first four episodes were shown on Toonami in 2001, and the finished film was released on DVD in 2003. That December, Daft Punk released Daft Club, a compilation of Discovery remixes. In 2001, Daft Punk released a 45-minute excerpt from a Daftendirektour performance as Alive 1997.

=== 2004–2007: Human After All and Alive 2007 ===
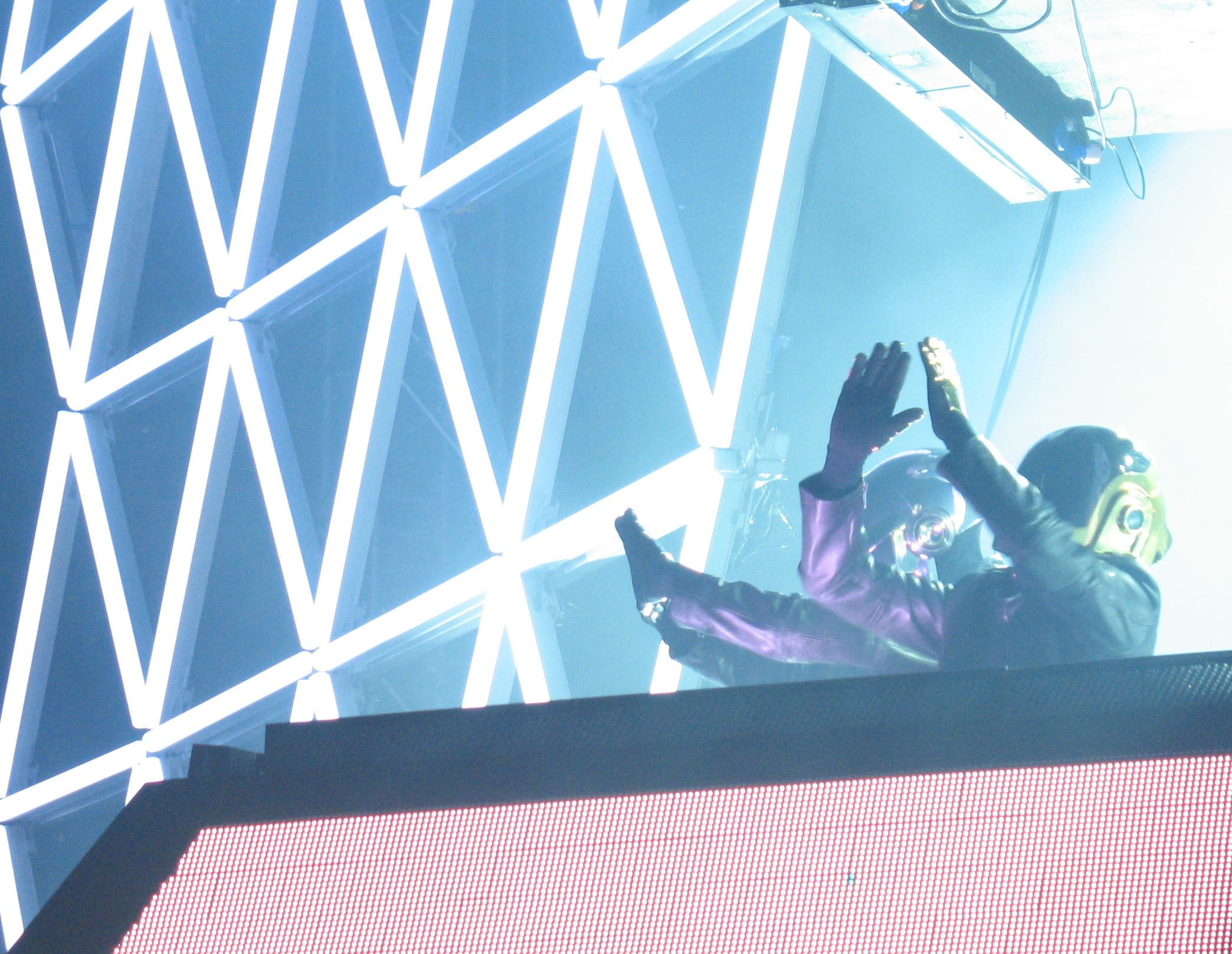
Daft Punk performing at the Alive 2006/2007 tour in July 2007

In March 2005, Daft Punk released their third album, Human After All, the result of six weeks of writing and recording. Reviews were mixed, with criticism for its repetitiveness and darker mood. "Robot Rock", "Technologic", "Human After All" and "The Prime Time of Your Life" were released as singles. A Daft Punk anthology CD/DVD, Musique Vol. 1 1993–2005, was released on 4 April 2006. Daft Punk also released a remix album, Human After All: Remixes.

On 21 May 2006, Daft Punk premiered a film, Daft Punk's Electroma, at the Cannes Film Festival sidebar Director's Fortnight. It does not include Daft Punk's music. Midnight screenings were held in Paris theatres from March 2007.

For 48 dates across 2006 and 2007, Daft Punk performed the Alive 2006/2007 world tour, performing a "megamix" of their music from a large LED-fronted pyramid. The tour was acclaimed and is credited for bringing dance music to a wider audience, especially in North America. The Guardian journalist Gabriel Szatan likened it to how The Beatles' 1964 performance on The Ed Sullivan Show had brought British rock and roll to the American mainstream.

Daft Punk's performance in Paris was released as their second live album, Alive 2007, on 19 November 2007. The live version of "Harder, Better, Faster, Stronger" was released as a single, with a video by Olivier Gondry comprising audience footage of their performance in Brooklyn. In 2009, Daft Punk won Grammy Awards for Alive 2007 and its single "Harder, Better, Faster, Stronger".

=== 2008–2011: Tron: Legacy ===
In 2007, Kanye West sampled "Harder, Better, Faster, Stronger" in his single "Stronger". Daft Punk made a surprise appearance at the 50th Grammy Awards on 10 February 2008, and performed a reworked version of "Stronger" with West at the Staples Center in Los Angeles. It was the first televised Daft Punk live performance.

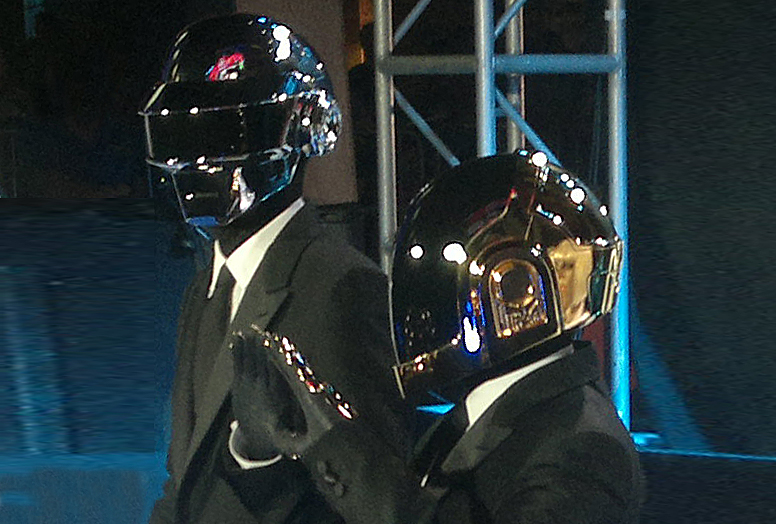
Daft Punk at the world premiere of Tron: Legacy in Los Angeles, 2010

In 2008, Daft Punk returned to Paris to work on new material. Winter also stepped down as their manager to focus attention on his Ed Banger Records label and his work as Busy P. He said later that Daft Punk were working with an unspecified management company in Los Angeles. Daft Punk held their Daft Arts production office at the Jim Henson Studios complex in Hollywood. Daft Punk provided new mixes for the 2009 video game DJ Hero, and appeared as playable characters.

At the 2009 San Diego Comic-Con, it was announced that Daft Punk had composed 24 tracks for the film Tron: Legacy. Daft Punk's score was arranged and orchestrated by Joseph Trapanese. The band collaborated with him for two years on the score, from pre-production to completion. The score features an 85-piece orchestra, recorded at AIR Lyndhurst Studios in London. Joseph Kosinski, director of the film, referred to the score as a mixture of orchestral and electronic elements. Daft Punk also made a cameo as DJs in the film wearing their robot helmets. The soundtrack album was released on 6 December 2010. A music video for "Derezzed" premiered on the MTV Networks on the same day the album was released. The video, which features Olivia Wilde as the character Quorra in specially shot footage, along with images of Daft Punk in Flynn's Arcade, was later made available for purchase from the iTunes Store and included in the DVD and Blu-ray releases of the film. Walt Disney Records released a remix album, Tron: Legacy Reconfigured, on 5 April 2011.

In 2010, Daft Punk were admitted into the Ordre des Arts et des Lettres, an order of merit of France. Bangalter and Homem-Christo were individually awarded the rank of Chevalier (knight). On October of that year, Daft Punk made a surprise guest appearance during the encore of Phoenix's show at Madison Square Garden in New York City. They played a medley of "Harder, Better, Faster, Stronger" and "Around the World" before the song segued into Phoenix's song "1901". They also included elements of their tracks "Rock'n Roll", "Human After All", and "Together", one of Bangalter's releases as a member of Together. They produced N.E.R.D.'s 2010 song "Hypnotize U".

=== 2011–2015: Random Access Memories ===
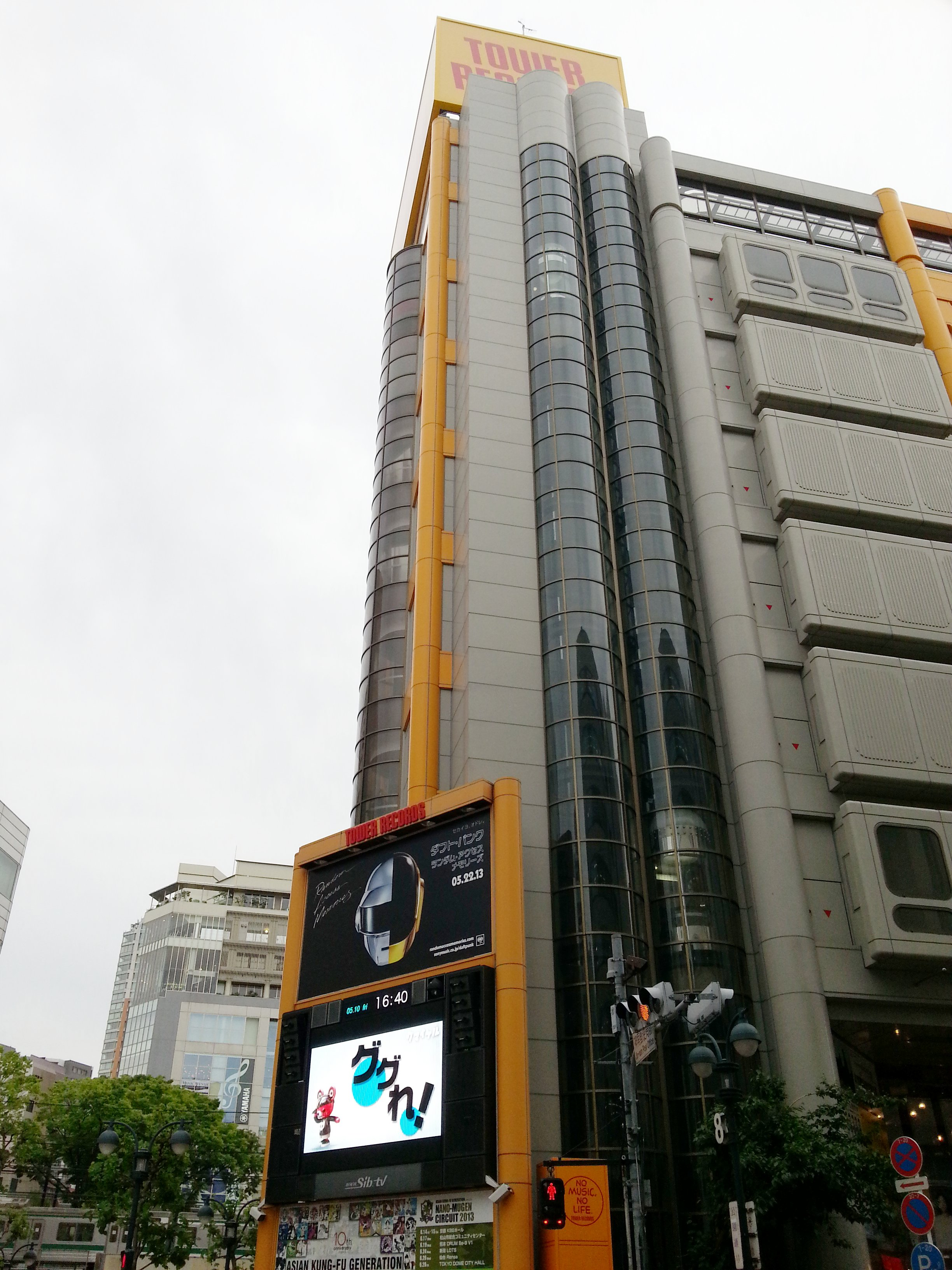
Billboard at Tower Records promoting Random Access Memories in May 2013 in Shibuya

In 2011, Soma Records released a previously unpublished Daft Punk track, "Drive", recorded while they were signed to Soma in the 1990s. It was included in a 20th-anniversary compilation of the Soma label. In October 2012, Daft Punk provided a 15-minute mix of songs by blues musician Junior Kimbrough for Hedi Slimane's Yves Saint Laurent fashion show. Daft Punk recorded their fourth studio album, Random Access Memories, with musicians including Julian Casablancas, Todd Edwards (who previously collaborated with the duo for their Discovery track Face to Face), DJ Falcon, Panda Bear, Chilly Gonzales, Paul Williams, Pharrell Williams, Chic frontman Nile Rodgers and Giorgio Moroder. Daft Punk departed Virgin for Sony Music Entertainment through the Columbia Records label.

Random Access Memories was released on 17 May 2013. In an interview with Entertainment Weekly, Bangalter said that Random Access Memories came from a change in priority, saying that they had "focused in the past on trying to make the music of the future, and here, it's actually maybe much more focused on the present". The lead single, "Get Lucky", became Daft Punk's first UK number-one single and the most-streamed new song in the history of Spotify. At the 2013 MTV Video Music Awards, Daft Punk debuted a trailer for their single "Lose Yourself to Dance" and presented the award for "Best Female Video" alongside Rodgers and Williams. In December, they revealed a music video for the song "Instant Crush", directed by Warren Fu and featuring Casablancas.

At the 56th Annual Grammy Awards, Random Access Memories won the Grammy for Best Dance/Electronica Album, Album of the Year and Best Engineered Album, Non-Classical, while "Get Lucky" received the Grammy for Best Pop Duo/Group Performance and Record of the Year. Daft Punk performed at the ceremony with Stevie Wonder, Rodgers, Pharrell, and the Random Access Memories rhythm players Nathan East, Omar Hakim, Paul Jackson, Jr. and Chris Caswell. That night, Daft Punk hosted a large Grammys afterparty at the Park Plaza Hotel in Los Angeles, with many celebrities and no photography allowed.

Daft Punk co-produced Kanye West's sixth studio album, Yeezus (2013), creating the tracks "On Sight", "Black Skinhead", "I Am a God" and "Send It Up" with West. They provided additional vocals for Pharrell's 2014 single "Gust of Wind". On 10 March 2014, an unreleased Daft Punk song, "Computerized", leaked online. It features Jay-Z and contains "The Son of Flynn" from the Tron: Legacy soundtrack; it was once intended to be a single promoting Tron: Legacy or to play over the end credits. In April 2015, Daft Punk appeared in a short tribute to Rodgers as part of a documentary on his life, Nile Rodgers: From Disco to Daft Punk. In June, a documentary, Daft Punk Unchained, was released.

=== 2016–2020: Final projects and appearances ===
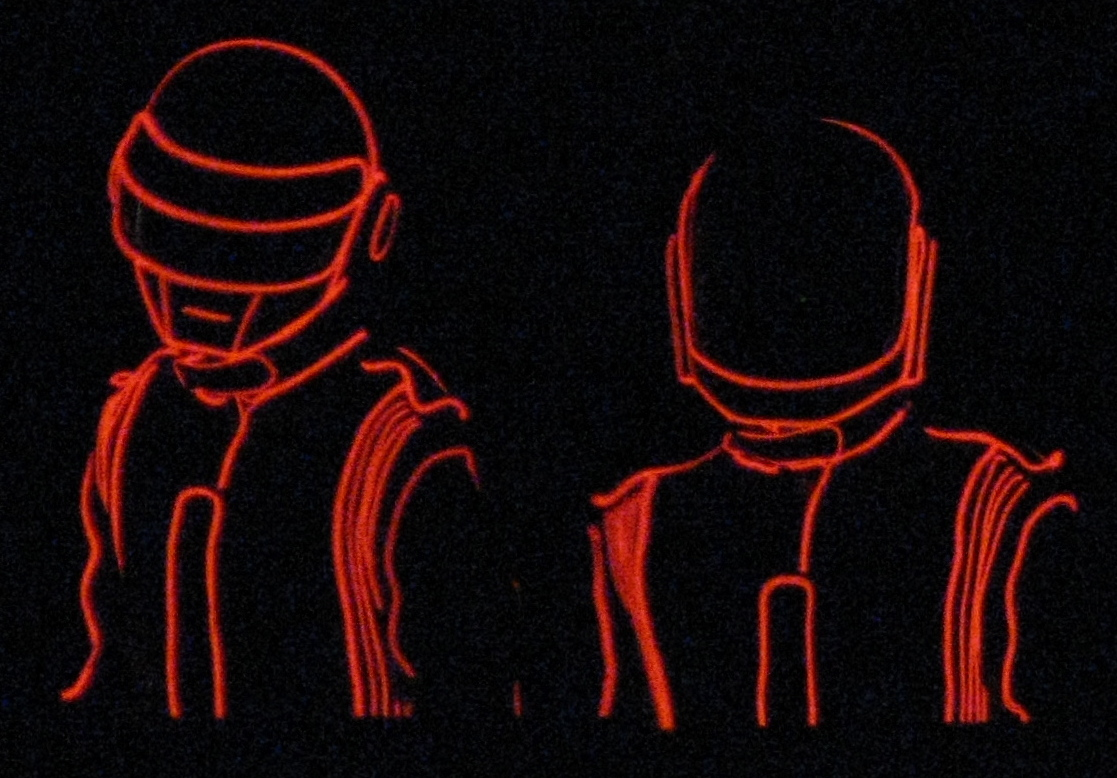
Light-up outfits worn at the encore of the Alive 2007 tour performances

Daft Punk appeared on the 2016 singles "Starboy" and "I Feel It Coming" by Canadian R&B singer the Weeknd; "Starboy" topped the Billboard Hot 100, becoming Daft Punk's only US number-one song, and "I Feel It Coming" reached number four. In 2017, Soma Records released a remix of "Drive" by Slam as part of a compilation featuring various artists. In February 2017, Daft Punk launched a pop-up shop in Hollywood, California, featuring memorabilia, artwork, and a display of their costumes. They also performed with the Weeknd at the 59th Annual Grammy Awards on 12 February 2017.

In the years following the Starboy collaborations, Bangalter and Homem-Christo worked solo as producers appearing on several projects. On 21 June 2017, the Australian electropop band Parcels released the song "Overnight", produced and co-written by Daft Punk. It was written after Daft Punk saw Parcels perform and invited the members to their studio. This would eventually become Daft Punk's final musical production as a duo.

In 2018, Daft Punk entered the studio with drummer W.F. Quinn Smith to begin recording a potential fifth album alongside guitarist Paul Jackson Jr. and an additional wind instrumentalist. Smith, who had previously worked on Random Access Memories, described the sessions as experimental and spontaneous and stated he was the first musician brought in for the new project. In a 2024 interview with alt.news 26:46, he recalled spending four to five days recording with the duo at Henson Studios (Chaplin Studios) in Los Angeles. The material remained unreleased following the duo's disbandment in 2021. Smith suggested that the recordings might eventually be revisited.

Between 9 April and 11 August 2019, an electronic exhibition based on Daft Punk's song "Technologic" was displayed at the Philharmonie de Paris, featuring costumes, guitars and other elements.

=== 2021–present: Disbandment and separate projects ===
On 22 February 2021, Daft Punk released a video on their YouTube channel titled "Epilogue". The video features a scene from their 2006 film Electroma, in which one robot explodes and the other walks away into the sunset; a title card created with Warren Fu reads "1993–2021" while an excerpt of Daft Punk's song "Touch" plays, indicating their disbandment. Later that day, Daft Punk's longtime publicist, Kathryn Frazier, confirmed that they had split, but did not give a reason. The news led to a surge in Daft Punk sales, with digital album purchases rising by 2,650%. Their friend and collaborator Todd Edwards confirmed that Bangalter and Homem-Christo remained active separately. He later said they were "going in different directions", and that Homem-Christo was more drawn to hip-hop and Bangalter was interested in film. As of 2023, Bangalter and Homem-Christo still share a studio and equipment.

In February 2022, Daft Punk announced a 25th-anniversary edition of Homework. It included a remix album, Homework (Remixes), which was also released separately. Daft Punk also broadcast a Twitch stream of their performance at the Mayan Theater in Los Angeles from their 1997 Daftendirektour. The video featured previously unreleased footage of the duo without costumes. Daft Punk released behind-the-scenes "archives" from the D.A.F.T. DVD and vinyl repressing for Human After All, Alive 2007, and Daft Club, which were released on 9 September 2022.

On 12 May 2023, Daft Punk released a 10th-anniversary edition of Random Access Memories, with 35 minutes of previously unreleased outtakes and demos. Songs include "Horizon" (included in the Japanese and Deluxe editions in 2013), and the version of "Touch" used for the "Epilogue" YouTube video in 2021. "Infinity Repeating (2013 Demo)", featuring Casablancas and the Voidz, was released as a single with a music video. It was called Daft Punk's "last song ever" in press releases. Ahead of the album’s release, Daft Punk unveiled a preview of several previously unreleased tracks from the anniversary album on their YouTube channel and major digital distribution platforms, including "The Writing of Fragments of Time", a studio session with Todd Edwards, on 22 March, and "GLBTM (Studio Outtakes)", an early version of "Give Life Back to Music", on 20 April. On 17 November, Daft Punk released a version of Random Access Memories with no drums or percussion.

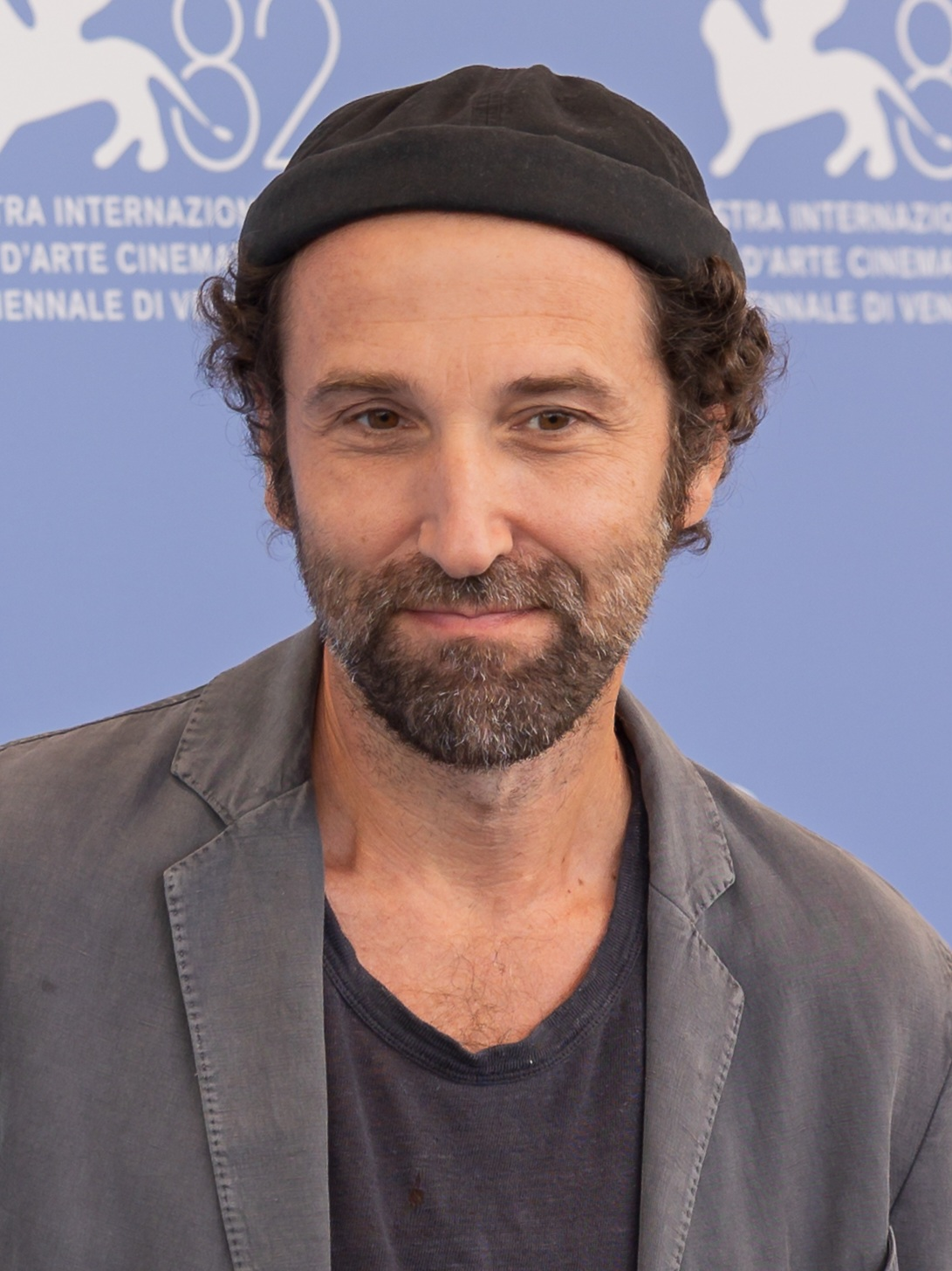
Bangalter, unmasked, in September 2025

In April 2023, Bangalter released a solo work, the orchestral ballet score Mythologies. The press release of Mythologies included a drawing of his unmasked face, and in interviews about the project, he allowed himself to be photographed without a mask. He cited concerns about the progress of artificial intelligence and other technology as to why Daft Punk disbanded, saying: "As much as I love this character, the last thing I would want to be, in the world we live in, in 2023, is a robot." Bangalter said Daft Punk had wanted to not "spoil the narrative" while they were active, but now felt more comfortable revealing parts of their creative process. Reflecting on the disbandment, Bangalter said he was "relieved and happy to look back and say: 'Okay, we didn't mess it up too much.'"

In February 2024, Daft Punk announced a Twitch broadcast of Interstella 5555: The 5tory of the 5ecret 5tar 5ystem. A vinyl repress of the Discovery single "Something About Us" was released on Record Store Day in April 2024. A 4K AI upscale of Interstella 5555 premiered in June at Tribeca Festival. The remaster was shown in global theatres for one weekend in December. A reissue of Discovery (Interstella 5555 Edition) was also released, featuring a gold vinyl version limited to 5,555 copies and new Daft Club membership cards.

In September 2025, the online video game Fortnite revealed the virtual "Daft Punk Experience", adding interactive activities, Daft Punk outfits, and other accessories. Billed as the biggest Fortnite musical event so far, it was made in collaboration with Daft Life. Cédric Hervet, Daft Punk's creative director, said the event focused on Daft Punk's legacy. The Epic Games executive Alex Rigopulos described the project as a "love letter" to Daft Punk.

On 15 October 2025, in celebration of the 20th anniversary of Human After All, Daft Punk announced the first vinyl release of Human After All: Remixes, released on 28 November. On 20 October, Daft Punk shared a recording of the Phoenix concert at Madison Square Garden in New York, at which Daft Punk had performed 15 years earlier. On 7 November, Daft Punk released a music video for "Contact" on YouTube. It was created by Epic Games and Magnopus, based on the opening sequence of the Daft Punk Experience game mode in Fortnite. In February 2026, Daft Punk released a video for their 2005 song "Human After All" based on footage from Electroma. A 4K restoration of Electroma premiered at Tribeca Festival for its 20th anniversary in June 2026, with Bangalter and Hervet in attendance for a Q&A after the screening.

On 22 October 2026, The Lego Group announced a collaboration with Daft Punk, in which a Lego Ideas set based on their Alive 2007 performance will be released. Between 20 and 22 November 2026, a photography exhibition in Paris titled "Around the World" was displayed, showcasing over 60 rare and previously unseen photographs of Daft Punk between the years of 1995 and 2007, taken by photographers including Tetsuro Sato, Rick Guest, Zach Cordner, and Seb Janiak.

== Artistry ==
=== Music ===
Daft Punk's musical style has been described as house, French house, electronic, dance, and disco. Sean Cooper of AllMusic described it as a blend of acid house, techno, pop, indie rock, hip-hop, progressive house, funk, and electro.

Daft Punk used samples extensively, which the Guardian critic Alexis Petridis described as "magpie-like". Homem-Christo described the technique as bricolage, the art of using found sounds to create new work. Bangalter said in 2008: "I think that sampling is always something that we've completely legitimately done. It's not something we've hidden, it's almost a partisan or ideological way of making music, sampling things and being sampled ... It's always been a way to reinterpret things—sometimes it's using [an] element from the past, or sometimes recreating them and fooling the eyes or the ears, which is just a fun thing to do."

According to Pitchfork, some fans were disappointed to discover that Daft Punk used samples. In 2007, Rapster released Discovered: A Collection of Daft Funk Samples, a compilation of tracks sampled by Daft Punk. Pitchfork wrote: "If [the compilation] proves anything, it isn't that Daft Punk are surreptitious thieves—it's that they're transformative reinterpreters, and in more than a few cases, flat-out miracle workers." Daft Punk also used vintage equipment to recreate sounds by older artists, such as the use of a Wurlitzer piano to evoke Supertramp on "Digital Love". They saw their style as retrofuturist, incorporating genres from earlier decades into what the New York Times described as "an increasingly grand vision of joyful populism". The DJ Erol Alkan said "the references are strong and familiar, and there is enough of themselves in there for it to always remain theirs".

In the early 1990s, Daft Punk drew inspiration from rock and acid house in the UK. Homem-Christo referred to Screamadelica by Primal Scream as the record that "put everything together" in terms of genre. In 2009, Bangalter named Andy Warhol as one of Daft Punk's early influences. On the Homework track "Teachers", Daft Punk list musicians who influenced them, including the funk musician George Clinton, the rapper and producer Dr Dre, and Chicago house and Detroit techno artists including Paul Johnson, Romanthony and Todd Edwards. Homem-Christo said: "Their music had a big effect on us. The sound of their productions—the compression, the sound of the kick drum and Romanthony's voice, the emotion and soul—is part of how we sound today."

Discovery integrates influences from 1970s disco and 1980s crooners, and featured collaborations with Romanthony and Edwards. A major inspiration was the 1999 Aphex Twin single "Windowlicker", which Bangalter said was "neither a purely club track nor a very chilled-out, down-tempo relaxation track". For the Tron: Legacy soundtrack, Daft Punk drew inspiration from Wendy Carlos, the composer of the original Tron film, as well as Max Steiner, Bernard Herrmann, John Carpenter, Vangelis, Philip Glass and Maurice Jarre. For Random Access Memories, Daft Punk sought a "west coast vibe", referencing acts such as Fleetwood Mac, the Doobie Brothers and the Eagles, and the French electronic musician Jean-Michel Jarre.

Many Daft Punk songs feature vocals processed with effects and vocoders including Auto-Tune, a Roland SVC-350 and the Digitech Vocalist. Bangalter said: "A lot of people complain about musicians using Auto-Tune. It reminds me of the late '70s when musicians in France tried to ban the synthesiser. They said it was taking jobs away from musicians. What they didn't see was that you could use those tools in a new way instead of just for replacing the instruments that came before. People are often afraid of things that sound new."

=== Image ===
For most public and media appearances, Daft Punk wore costumes that concealed their faces. Bangalter said they wanted the focus to be on their music, and that masks allowed them to control their image while retaining their anonymity and protecting their personal lives. He said that the 1974 film Phantom of the Paradise, in which the main character prominently wears a mask, was "the foundation for a lot of what we're about artistically". Daft Punk were also fans of the 1970s band Space, who wore space suits with helmets that hid their appearance. The mystery of Daft Punk's identity and their elaborate disguises added to their popularity.

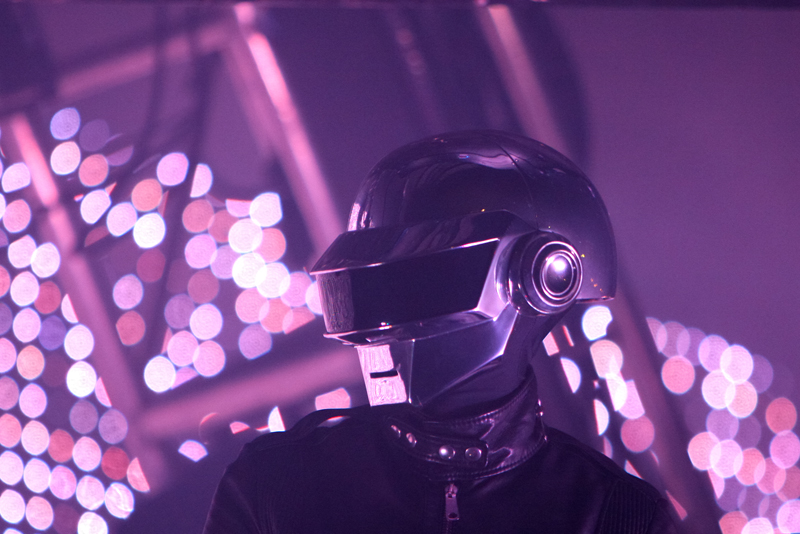
Bangalter performing in 2006

Daft Punk wore masks during promotional appearances in the 1990s. Although they allowed a camera crew to film them for a French arts program at the time, Daft Punk did not speak on screen. According to Orla Lee-Fisher, the head of marketing at Virgin Records UK, in their early career Daft Punk only consented to photographs without masks while they were DJing. In 1997, Bangalter said they had a rule to not appear in videos.

In 2001, Daft Punk began wearing robot costumes for promotional appearances and performances for Discovery, debuted in a special presentation during Cartoon Network's Toonami block. The helmets were produced by Paul Hahn of Daft Arts and the French directors Alex and Martin, with engineering by Tony Gardner and Alterian, Inc. They were capable of various LED effects. Wigs were originally attached to both helmets, but Daft Punk removed them moments before unveiling them. Bangalter said the helmets were hot but that he became used to this. Later helmets were fitted with ventilators to prevent overheating. The costumes were compared to the makeup of Kiss and the leather jacket worn by Iggy Pop.

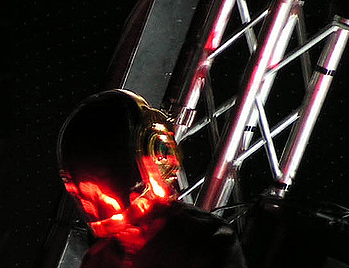
Homem-Christo performing in 2007

With the release of Human After All, Daft Punk wore simplified helmets and black leather jackets and trousers designed by Hedi Slimane. Bangalter said Daft Punk did not want to repeat themselves and were interested in "developing a persona that merges fiction and reality". On the set of Electroma, Daft Punk were interviewed with their backs turned, and in 2006 they wore cloth bags over their heads during a televised interview. They said the use of cloth bags had been a spontaneous decision, reflecting their willingness to experiment with their image. Daft Punk wore their robot costumes in their performances at the 2008, 2014, and 2017 Grammy Awards. During the 2014 ceremony, they accepted their awards on stage in the outfits, with Pharrell and Paul Williams speaking on their behalf.

Daft Punk used the robot outfits to merge the characteristics of humans and machines. Bangalter said that the personas were initially the result of shyness, but that they became exciting for the audience, "the idea of being an average guy with some kind of superpower". He described it as an advanced version of glam, "where it's definitely not you". After Daft Punk's split, Bangalter likened the robot personas to a "like a Marina Abramović performance art installation that lasted for 20 years". He denied that the robots represented "an unquestioning embrace of digital culture", and said: "We tried to use these machines to express something extremely moving that a machine cannot feel, but a human can. We were always on the side of humanity and not on the side of technology."

=== Media appearances ===
Daft Punk's popularity has been partially attributed to their appearances in mainstream media. They appeared with Juliette Lewis in an advertisement for the clothing retailer Gap, featuring their single "Digital Love", and were contractually obliged to appear only in Gap clothing. In 2001, Daft Punk appeared in an advertisement on Cartoon Network's Toonami timeslot, promoting the official Toonami website and the animated music videos for their album Discovery. The music videos later appeared as scenes in the feature-length film Interstella 5555: The 5tory of the 5ecret 5tar 5ystem, in which Daft Punk make a cameo appearance as their robot alter-egos. They appeared in a television advertisement wearing their Discovery-era headgear to promote Sony Ericsson's Premini mobile phone. In 2010, Daft Punk appeared in Adidas advertisements promoting a Star Wars clothing line. Daft Punk made a cameo in Tron: Legacy as nightclub DJs.

In 2011, Coca-Cola distributed limited edition bottles designed by Daft Punk. Daft Punk and Courtney Love were photographed for the "Music Project" of the fashion house Yves Saint Laurent. They appeared in their new sequined suits custom-made by Hedi Slimane, holding and playing instruments with bodies made of lucite. In 2013, Bandai released Daft Punk action figures coinciding with the release of Random Access Memories in Japan. Daft Punk made a rare public appearance at the 2013 Monaco Grand Prix in May on behalf of the Lotus F1 Team, who raced in cars emblazoned with the Daft Punk logo.

Footage of Daft Punk's 2006 performance at the Coachella Festival was featured in the documentary film Coachella: 20 Years in the Desert, released on YouTube in April 2020. Daft Punk were scheduled to appear on The Colbert Report to promote Random Access Memories in August 2013, but was cancelled due to contractual obligations regarding their appearance at the 2013 MTV Video Music Awards later that month. According to Stephen Colbert, Daft Punk were unaware of the agreement and were halted by MTV executives the morning prior to the taping. In 2015, Daft Punk appeared alongside several other musicians to announce their co-ownership of the music service Tidal at its relaunch.

Eden, a 2014 French drama film, has as its protagonist a techno fan-turned-DJ-turned recovering addict. It features Daft Punk (portrayed by actors) during different stages of their careers. Daft Punk also appear in Pharrell Williams's 2024 biographical film Piece by Piece.

Bangalter's helmet has appeared in two episodes of The Simpsons, "The Day the Earth Stood Cool" in which recurring character Disco Stu is seen wearing his helmet, and in "Treehouse of Horror Presents: The Revengening" in which Apu Nahasapeemapetilon wears a Halloween costume with monk clothing dubbed "Daft Monk".

== Legacy ==
Daft Punk are regarded as one of the most influential dance acts. In 2021, the chief Guardian music critic, Alexis Petridis, named them the most influential pop artists of the 21st century. In the same year, Pitchfork named them one of the most important artists of the preceding 25 years, writing: "It's impossible to imagine contemporary electronic dance music without Daft Punk ... They helped instil a philosophy of self-reinvention that would resonate with generations of musicians across electronic music, rock, hip-hop, and beyond."

Daft Punk collaborator Pharrell Williams said they were responsible for the rise of contemporary EDM. Bangalter said only that other acts were using "gimmicks" that, at the time Daft Punk used them, were "not really gimmicks". The New York Times credited Daft Punk with helping make dance music mainstream. In 2008, Daft Punk were voted the 38th-greatest DJs in a worldwide poll by DJ Mag. In 2015, Rolling Stone ranked Daft Punk the 12th-greatest musical duo.

In "Losing My Edge" (2002), the first single by LCD Soundsystem, the singer, James Murphy, jokingly brags about being the first to "play Daft Punk to the rock kids". Another LCD Soundsystem single, "Daft Punk Is Playing at My House", reached No. 29 in the UK and was nominated for Best Dance Recording at the 48th Annual Grammy Awards.

While accepting her British Dance Act award at the Brit Awards 2025, Charli XCX named Daft Punk as an influence. The French musician Madeon learnt about music production by reverse-engineering Daft Punk sounds, and cited their creative use of a cheap DigiTech pedal on Human After All as an example of their "genius, creativity and intuition ... They made an entire album using that pedal and it's a cheap $50 pedal that nobody gave the time of day at the time." Baicalellia daftpunka, a species of flatworm, was named after Daft Punk in 2018 for its partial resemblance to a helmet. In February 2024, Madame Tussauds New York unveiled wax figures of Daft Punk.

=== Covers and samples ===
Daft Punk tracks have been sampled or covered by other artists. "Technologic" was sampled by Swizz Beatz for the Busta Rhymes song "Touch It". In a later remix of "Touch It", the line "touch it, bring it, pay it, watch it, turn it, leave it, start, format it" from "Technologic" was sung by the rapper Missy Elliott. Kanye West's 2007 track "Stronger" interpolates the melody and features a vocal sample of "Harder, Better, Faster, Stronger", and Daft Punk's robotic costumes appeared in the music video. "Daftendirekt" was sampled in the Janet Jackson song "So Much Betta" from her 2008 album Discipline.

The track "Aerodynamic" was sampled for Wiley's 2008 single "Summertime". "Veridis Quo" from Discovery was sampled for the Jazmine Sullivan 2008 song "Dream Big". "Around the World" was sampled for JoJo's 2009 song "You Take Me (Around the World)". The song "Cowboy George" by the Fall contains a clip of "Harder, Better, Faster, Stronger". The a cappella group Pentatonix performed a medley of Daft Punk songs. As of August 2026, the video has been viewed over 385 million times. The medley won Best Arrangement, Instrumental or a Cappella at the 57th Annual Grammy Awards. In 2014, "Weird Al" Yankovic released Mandatory Fun which includes the polka medley "Now That's What I Call Polka!" The medley includes several popular songs and ends with Daft Punk's "Get Lucky." The medley reached No. 4 on Billboard's US Comedy Digital Tracks.

Daft Punk's "Technologic" was also interpolated in Charli XCX's 2024 song "Guess". A remix of "Guess" featuring Billie Eilish won Song of the Year at the Brit Awards 2025, and was nominated for Best Pop Duo/Group Performance at the 67th Annual Grammy Awards. A Daft Punk medley was played at the 2017 Bastille Day parade by a French military band, in front of French President Emmanuel Macron and his guests, which included US President Donald Trump.

== Discography ==
Studio albums

- Homework (1997)
- Discovery (2001)
- Human After All (2005)
- Random Access Memories (2013)

== Concert tours ==
- Daftendirektour (1997)
- Alive 2007 (2006–07)

== Awards and nominations ==
In October 2011, Daft Punk placed 28th in a "top-100 DJs of 2011" list by DJ Magazine after placing in the 44th position the year before. On 19 January 2012, Daft Punk ranked No. 2 on Mixmag's Greatest Dance Acts of All Time, with The Prodigy at No. 1 by just a few points.

== See also ==
- List of French Grammy Award winners and nominees
