= DJ Sneak =

American musician (born 1969)

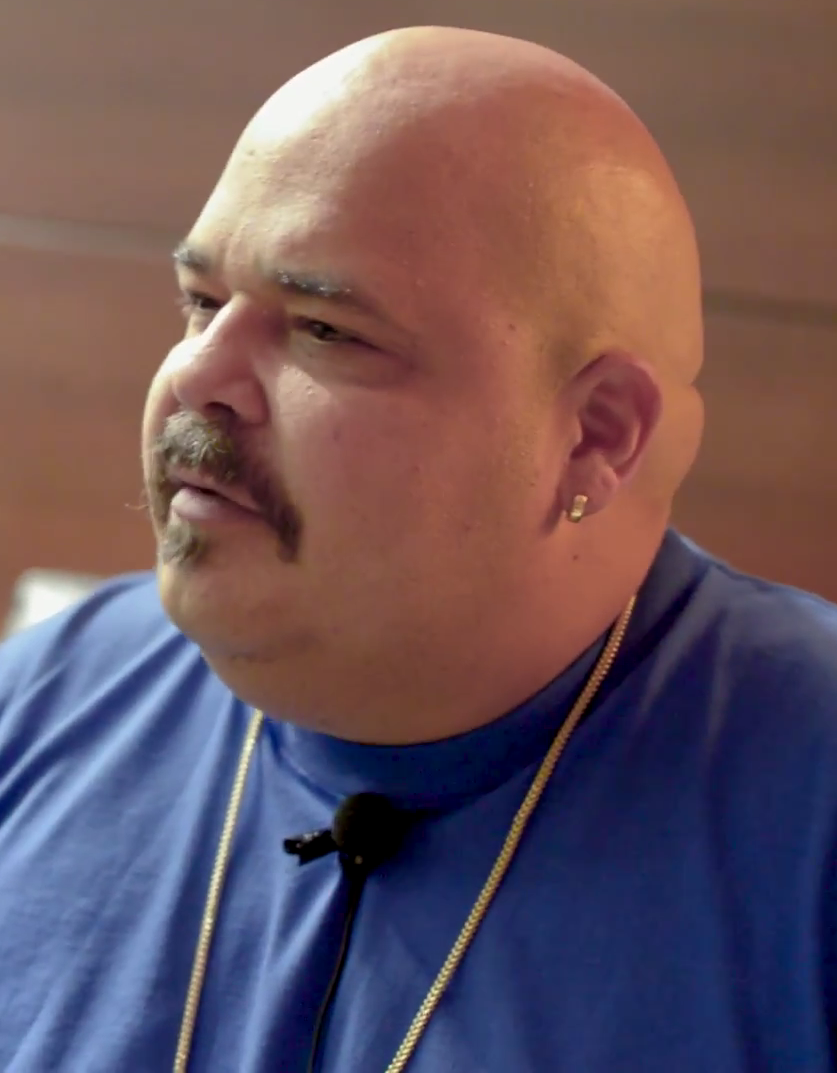

Background information
- Born: Carlos Sosa; November 5, 1969 (age 57); Puerto Rico
- Origin: Chicago, Illinois, U.S.
- Genre: House
- Occupations: Disc jockey; record producer

Carlos Sosa (born November 5, 1969), known professionally as DJ Sneak, is a Puerto Rican-born American DJ and record producer. Raised in Chicago, Illinois, he is noted as being one of the second wave of Chicago house producers, (alongside Derrick Carter, Cajmere/Green Velvet, Gemini, James Curd and Paul Johnson) as well as a member of the vanguard of late-1990s United States house producers.

== Biography ==
In 1983, Sneak moved to Chicago from Puerto Rico, where his early musical experiences and influences were rooted in salsa, merengue and Latin orchestras. In Chicago, Sneak found inspiration in underground house music, warehouse parties, and "old school" mix tapes from the early pioneers, Farley Jackmaster Funk, Ralphi Rosario, Steve Hurley, and local radio station shows played on WBMX.

Sneak earned his nickname rocking graffiti-tags and began working at retail stores as an airbrush artist. His development as a DJ came while working regular mobile DJ jobs and local nightclubs. Sneak focused on his music production and started his independent label – Defiant Records.

In 1994, while still working at local store Gramaphone Records, Sneak met Cajmere (Green Velvet), owner of Cajual and Relief Records. Cajmere released three of Sneak's catalyst tracks, which helped bring him international recognition.

In Ibiza, Sneak has participated in several events with Ministry of Sound, Cream, Manumission, and Miss Moneypenny's. Sneak currently resides in Los Angeles, California, US.

Lyrics by DJ Sneak are featured in the Daft Punk song, "Digital Love", from their 2001 album, Discovery. In 2001, Sneak launched a new record label Magnetic Recordings, where he has been releasing new music, with compilations to come, along with the introduction of new musical talent.

== Discography ==
=== Albums ===
- Kinky Trax Collection (1996)
- Blue Funk Files (1997)
- Buggin' da Beats (1997)
- Sneak's Ju Ju Beats (2001)
- Housekeepin' (2004)
- House of Om, Vol. 2 (2005)
- Thefunkrockdiscopartything (2006)
- Special House Blend (2008)
- The House of House (2009)
- Gangsters Paradise (2013)
- Fabric 62 (2012)
