= Daft Punk discography =

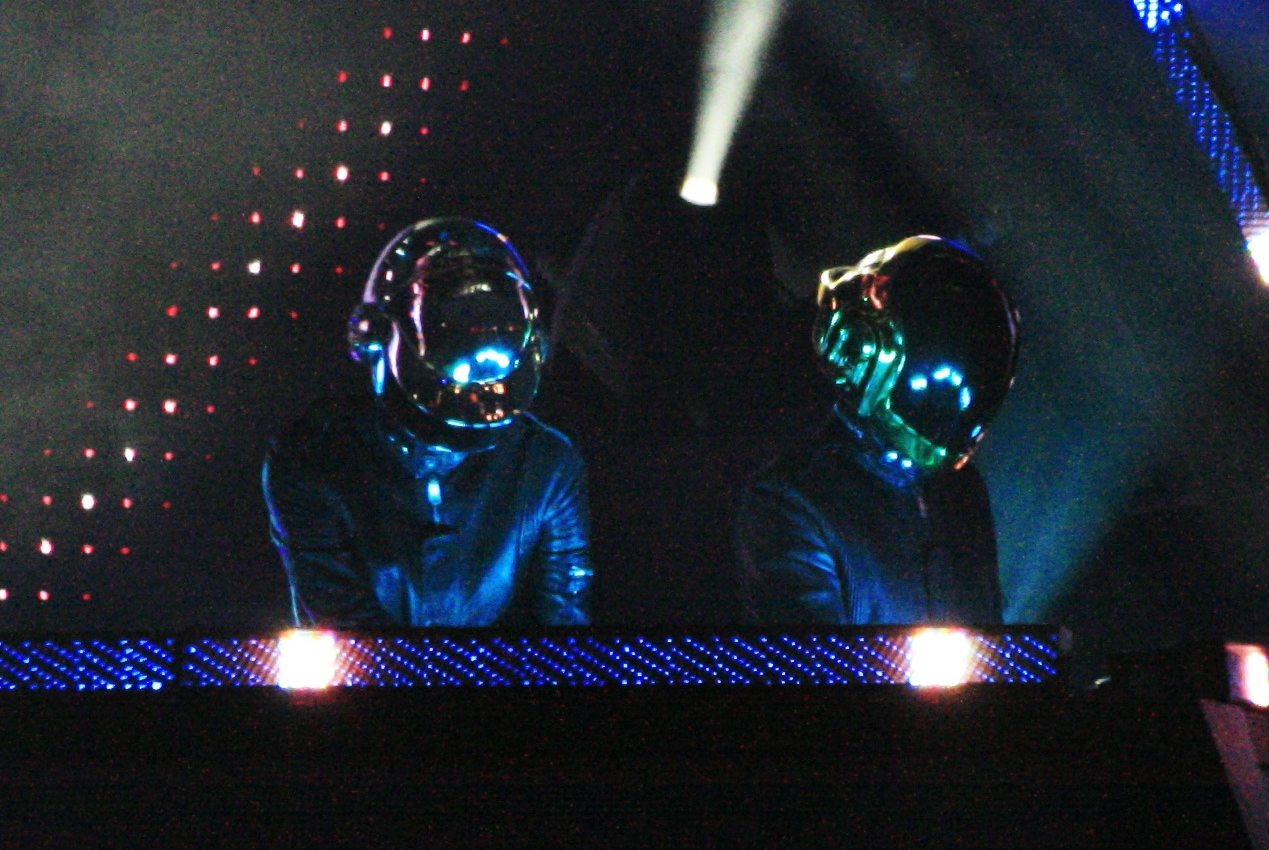
- Daft Punk performing at the O2 Wireless Festival in 2007
- Studio albums: 4
- Soundtrack albums: 1
- Live albums: 2
- Compilation albums: 1
- Singles: 26
- Video albums: 2
- Music videos: 24
- Remix albums: 5

French electronic music duo Daft Punk released four studio albums, two live albums, one compilation album, one soundtrack album, five remix albums, two video albums, twenty-two singles and twenty-four music videos. Group members Thomas Bangalter and Guy-Manuel de Homem-Christo met in 1987 while studying at the Lycée Carnot secondary school. They subsequently recorded several demo tracks together, forming Daft Punk in 1993. Their debut single "The New Wave" was released the following year on the Soma Quality Recordings label. Daft Punk first found commercial success with the release of their second single "Da Funk", which peaked at number seven in France and topped the United States Billboard Hot Dance Club Play chart.

After signing to Virgin Records, the duo released their debut studio album Homework in January 1997. The album peaked at number three in France, earning a platinum certification from the Syndicat National de l'Édition Phonographique (SNEP). The success of Homework also brought worldwide attention to progressive house music, and it has since been viewed as a landmark album of the genre. The Homework single "Around the World" became a top five hit in several European countries and gave the duo their first entry on the US Billboard Hot 100, where it peaked at number 61. The album also produced the singles "Burnin'" and "Revolution 909".

Daft Punk released their second studio album Discovery in February 2001. The album peaked at number two in France and attained a triple platinum certification from the SNEP. Discovery also performed well internationally, becoming a top ten chart hit in countries such as Australia, Canada and the United Kingdom. "One More Time", the album's first single, became a number-one hit in France and on the Billboard dance chart. The single also reached the top ten on the charts of Australia, Germany and the United Kingdom. An additional six singles were released from Discovery: "Aerodynamic", "Digital Love", "Harder, Better, Faster, Stronger", "Face to Face" and "Something About Us". Daft Punk also oversaw the release of Interstella 5555: The 5tory of the 5ecret 5tar 5ystem, a 2003 film featuring tracks from Discovery as its soundtrack. Human After All, the duo's third studio album, was released in March 2005 to mixed reviews. Nonetheless, the album topped the Billboard Dance/Electronic Albums chart and peaked at number three in France. Human After All featured the singles "Robot Rock", "Technologic", "Human After All" and "The Prime Time of Your Life".

Following their Alive 2006/2007 tour, Daft Punk composed the score for the 2010 film Tron: Legacy and released an accompanying soundtrack album. The album produced the single "Derezzed" and became the duo's first top five album on the Billboard 200. It also received a platinum and gold certifications from the Recording Industry Association of America (RIAA) and SNEP, respectively. Random Access Memories, Daft Punk's first studio album in eight years, was released in May 2013 and topped several charts worldwide. In France, the album was Daft Punk's first release to debut at number one, a position it retained for three consecutive weeks after its release. "Get Lucky", the first single from Random Access Memories, also experienced chart success in several countries. In 2016, Daft Punk was featured on two singles from Canadian R&B singer The Weeknd entitled "Starboy" and "I Feel It Coming". The former topped charts in several countries and received a platinum certification from the RIAA, while the latter peaked at number one in France and earned a diamond certification from the SNEP. The duo officially broke up in February 2021; however, during December of the same year, the Tron: Legacy soundtrack reentered and topped the Dance/Electronic Albums chart after a vinyl edition of the album was released in Target stores. Exactly a year after their split and to commemorate the 25th anniversary of Homework's release, the duo released a special edition of the album containing various remixes which were also released as a standalone album, Homework (Remixes), later in the year. A 10th anniversary edition of Random Access Memories was released in May 2023.

== Albums ==
=== Studio albums ===
List of studio albums, with selected details, selected chart positions, sales figures and certifications
Title	Details	Peak chart positions										Sales	Certifications
Title	Details	FRA	AUS	BEL	CAN	GER	IRL	ITA	SWI	UK	US	Sales	Certifications
Homework	Released: 20 January 1997 (FRA); Label: Virgin, Soma; Formats: CD, LP, MC, MD, digital download, streaming	3	37	7	15	44	54	19	33	8	150	FRA: 500,000 (Note: Sales as of January 2017); UK: 345,009 (Note: Sales as of May 2013); US: 674,000 (Note: Sales as of May 2013)	SNEP: Platinum; BPI: Platinum; BRMA: Platinum; MC: 2× Platinum; RIAA: Gold
Discovery	Released: 12 March 2001 (FRA); Label: Virgin; Formats: CD, LP, MC, digital download, streaming	2	7	1	2	5	4	8	6	2	23	FRA: 800,000 (Note: Sales as of August 2020); UK: 657,500 (Note: Sales as of May 2013); US: 802,000 (Note: Sales as of May 2013)	SNEP: 3× Platinum; ARIA: Gold; BPI: 2× Platinum; BRMA: Gold; BVMI: Gold; FIMI: Platinum; IFPI SWI: Gold; MC: Gold; RIAA: Gold
Human After All	Released: 14 March 2005 (FRA); Label: Virgin; Formats: CD, LP, MC, digital download, streaming	3	36	8	38	38	10	19	8	10	98	UK: 80,838; US: 127,000 (Note: Sales as of May 2013)	SNEP: 2× Gold; BPI: Gold
Random Access Memories	Released: 17 May 2013 (VAR); Label: Columbia; Formats: CD, LP, digital download, streaming	1	1	1	1	1	1	1	1	1	1	FRA: 1,000,000 (Note: Sales as of February 2021)	SNEP: 2× Diamond; ARIA: 2× Platinum; BPI: 2× Platinum; BRMA: Platinum; BVMI: 3× Gold; FIMI: 3× Platinum; IFPI SWI: Platinum; IRMA: Platinum; MC: 3× Platinum; RIAA: 2× Platinum

=== Live albums ===
List of live albums, with selected details, selected chart positions and certifications
Title	Details	Peak chart positions										Certifications
Title	Details	FRA	AUS	BEL	IRL	ITA	NLD	SCO	SWI	UK	US	Certifications
Alive 1997	Released: 1 October 2001 (FRA); Label: Virgin; Formats: CD, LP, digital download, streaming	25	—	—	—	—	—	—	—	—	—	
Alive 2007	Released: 16 November 2007 (FRA); Label: Virgin; Formats: CD, LP, digital download, streaming	2	14	6	38	98	47	73	17	86	169	SNEP: 2× Platinum; ARIA: Gold; BPI: Silver; BRMA: Platinum
"—" denotes a recording that did not chart or was not released in that territory.

=== Soundtrack albums ===
List of soundtrack albums, with selected details, selected chart positions, sales figures and certifications
Title	Details	Peak chart positions										Sales	Certifications
Title	Details	FRA	AUS	BEL	CAN	GER	IRL	ITA	SWI	UK	US	Sales	Certifications
Tron: Legacy	Released: 7 December 2010 (FRA); Label: Walt Disney; Formats: CD, LP, digital download, streaming	25	17	14	17	17	40	41	21	39	4	US: 593,398	SNEP: Gold; ARIA: Gold; BPI: Gold; RIAA: Platinum

=== Remix albums ===
List of remix albums, with selected details and selected chart positions
Title	Details	Peak chart positions									
Title	Details	FRA	AUS	BEL	CAN	SCO	SWE	SWI	UK	US	US Dance
Daft Club	Released: 2 December 2003 (FRA); Label: Virgin; Formats: CD, LP, digital download, streaming	130	—	—	—	—	—	69	—	—	8
Human After All: Remixes	Released: 29 March 2006 (JPN); Label: Toshiba EMI; Formats: CD, LP, digital download, streaming	—	—	—	—	—	—	—	—	—	—
Tron: Legacy Reconfigured	Released: 5 April 2011 (FRA); Label: Walt Disney; Formats: CD, LP, digital download, streaming	—	64	91	24	83	41	—	59	16	1
Homework (Remixes)	Released: 22 February 2022 (FRA); Label: Warner Music France; Formats: CD, LP, digital download, streaming	28	—	—	—	—	—	—	—	—	17
Random Access Memories (Drumless Edition)	Released: 17 November 2023 (FRA); Label: Columbia, Legacy; Formats: CD, LP, digital download, streaming	—	—	—	—	—	—	—	—	—	—
"—" denotes a recording that did not chart or was not released in that territory.

=== Compilation albums ===
List of compilation albums, with selected details, selected chart positions and certifications
Title	Details	Peak chart positions										Certifications
Title	Details	FRA	AUS	BEL	GER	IRL	NLD	SCO	SWI	UK	US Dance	Certifications
Musique Vol. 1 1993–2005	Released: 4 April 2006 (FRA); Label: Virgin; Formats: CD, digital download, streaming	127	47	18	90	34	— (Note: Musique Vol. 1 1993–2005 did not enter the Dutch Album Top 100, but entered the Dutch Midprice Top 50 chart at number 33.)	31	36	34	12	BPI: Platinum

=== Video albums ===
List of video albums, with selected details
Title	Details	Certifications
D.A.F.T.: A Story About Dogs, Androids, Firemen and Tomatoes	Released: 28 March 2000 (FRA); Label: Virgin; Formats: DVD	
Interstella 5555: The 5tory of the 5ecret 5tar 5ystem	Released: 18 May 2003 (FRA); Label: Virgin; Formats: DVD	SNEP: 3× Platinum

== Singles ==
=== As lead artist ===
List of singles as lead artist, with selected chart positions and certifications, showing year released and album name
Title	Year	Peak chart positions										Certifications	Album
Title	Year	FRA	AUS	BEL	GER	IRL	ITA	SWE	SWI	UK	US	Certifications	Album
"The New Wave"	1994	—	—	—	—	—	—	—	—	—	—		Non-album single
"Da Funk"	1995	7	31	9	—	20	—	33	—	7	— (Note: "Da Funk" did not enter the Billboard Hot 100, but peaked at number eight on the Bubbling Under Hot 100 Singles chart.)	SNEP: Silver; BPI: Silver	Homework
"Indo Silver Club"	1996	—	—	—	—	—	—	—	—	—	—		Homework
"Around the World"	1997	5	11	4	16	8	1	20	14	5	61	SNEP: Silver; ARIA: Gold; BPI: Platinum; FIMI: Gold	Homework
"Burnin'"	1997	29	151	38	—	—	7	—	—	30	—		Homework
"Revolution 909"	1998	50	162	50	—	—	—	—	—	47	—		Homework
"One More Time"	2000	1	10	6	7	9	5	26	6	2	61	SNEP: Gold; ARIA: Gold; BPI: 2× Platinum; BRMA: Gold; BVMI: Gold; FIMI: Platinum; IFPI SWI: Gold	Discovery
"Aerodynamic"	2001	34	67 (Note: "Aerodynamic" and "Digital Love" charted as a double A-side single in Australia.)	24	—	—	32	—	46	97	—		Discovery
"Digital Love"	2001	33	67	38	85	35	28	—	60	14	—	BPI: Silver	Discovery
"Harder, Better, Faster, Stronger"	2001	17	—	38	—	38	42	—	70	25	—	BPI: Platinum	Discovery
"Face to Face"	2003	—	—	—	—	—	—	—	—	—	—		Discovery
"Something About Us"	2003	93	—	—	—	—	—	—	—	138	—		Discovery
"Robot Rock"	2005	79	—	56	100	33	32	—	—	32	—		Human After All
"Technologic"	2005	—	64	65	82	38	22	29	63	40	— (Note: "Technologic" did not enter the Billboard Hot 100, but peaked at number 16 on the Bubbling Under Hot 100 Singles chart.)		Human After All
"Human After All"	2005	93	—	—	—	—	—	—	—	—	—		Human After All
"The Prime Time of Your Life"	2006	—	—	—	—	—	—	—	—	—	—		Human After All
"Harder, Better, Faster, Stronger (Alive 2007)"	2007	19	43	16	—	—	—	—	50	—	—		Alive 2007
"Derezzed"	2010	81	92	68	—	—	100	—	—	158	— (Note: "Derezzed" did not enter the Billboard Hot 100, but peaked at number three on the Bubbling Under Hot 100 Singles chart.)	RIAA: Gold	Tron: Legacy soundtrack
"Get Lucky" (featuring Pharrell Williams and Nile Rodgers)	2013	1	1	1	1	1	1	2	1	1	2	SNEP: Diamond; ARIA: 6× Platinum; BPI: 4× Platinum; BRMA: Platinum; BVMI: 5× Gold; FIMI: 5× Platinum; IFPI SWE: 2× Platinum; IFPI SWI: 3× Platinum; RIAA: 8× Platinum	Random Access Memories
"Lose Yourself to Dance" (featuring Pharrell Williams)	2013	31	— (Note: "Lose Yourself to Dance" did not enter the Australian ARIA Singles Chart but peaked at number six on the ARIA Streaming Tracks Chart.)	32	—	62	17	42	59	49	— (Note: "Lose Yourself to Dance" did not enter the Billboard Hot 100, but peaked at number three on the Bubbling Under Hot 100 Singles chart.)	BPI: Silver; FIMI: Gold; RIAA: Platinum	Random Access Memories
"Doin' It Right" (featuring Panda Bear)	2013	63	— (Note: "Doin' It Right" did not enter the Australian ARIA Singles Chart but peaked at number 17 on the ARIA Streaming Tracks Chart.)	—	—	—	—	—	—	193	— (Note: "Doin' It Right" did not enter the Billboard Hot 100, but peaked at number 11 on the Bubbling Under Hot 100 Singles chart.)	RIAA: Gold	Random Access Memories
"Instant Crush" (featuring Julian Casablancas)	2013	4	— (Note: "Instant Crush" did not enter the Australian ARIA Singles Chart but peaked at number seven on the ARIA Streaming Tracks Chart.)	5	—	—	85	37	40	198	— (Note: "Instant Crush" did not enter the Billboard Hot 100, but peaked at number 16 on the Bubbling Under Hot 100 Singles chart.)	SNEP: Gold; BPI: Silver; FIMI: Gold; RIAA: Platinum	Random Access Memories
"Give Life Back to Music"	2014	23	— (Note: "Give Life Back to Music" did not enter the Australian ARIA Singles Chart but peaked at number two on the ARIA Streaming Tracks Chart.)	52	—	—	94	35	58	164	— (Note: "Give Life Back to Music" did not enter the Billboard Hot 100, but peaked at number 13 on the Bubbling Under Hot 100 Singles chart.)		Random Access Memories
"The Writing of Fragments of Time" (featuring Todd Edwards)	2023	—	—	—	—	—	—	—	—	—	—		Random Access Memories (10th Anniversary Edition)
"GLBTM (Studio Outtakes)"	2023	—	—	—	—	—	—	—	—	—	—		Random Access Memories (10th Anniversary Edition)
"Infinity Repeating (2013 Demo)" (featuring Julian Casablancas and The Voidz)	2023	181	—	—	—	—	—	—	—	—	—		Random Access Memories (10th Anniversary Edition)
"—" denotes a recording that did not chart or was not released in that territory.

=== As featured artist ===
List of singles as featured artist, with selected chart positions and certifications, showing year released and album name
Title	Year	Peak chart positions										Certifications	Album
Title	Year	FRA	AUS	BEL	GER	IRL	ITA	SWE	SWI	UK	US	Certifications	Album
"Starboy" (The Weeknd featuring Daft Punk)	2016	1	2	2	3	2	6	1	2	2	1	SNEP: Diamond; ARIA: 15× Platinum; BPI: 6× Platinum; BRMA: 2× Platinum; BVMI: 3× Gold; FIMI: 4× Platinum; IFPI SWE: 4× Platinum; RIAA: 15× Platinum	Starboy
"I Feel It Coming" (The Weeknd featuring Daft Punk)	2016	1	7	6	29	9	13	5	7	9	4	SNEP: Diamond; ARIA: 8× Platinum; BPI: 3× Platinum; BRMA: Platinum; BVMI: Platinum; FIMI: 3× Platinum; IFPI SWE: 3× Platinum; RIAA: 6× Platinum	Starboy

== Other charted songs ==
List of other charted songs, with selected chart positions, showing year released and album name
Title	Year	Peak chart positions								Album
Title	Year	FRA	AUS	ITA	SWE	SWI	UK	UK Dance	US Elec.	Album
"Veridis Quo"	2001	—	—	—	—	—	— (Note: "Veridis Quo" did not enter the UK Singles Chart, but peaked at number 96 on the UK Singles Downloads Chart.)	—	—	Discovery
"Around the World" / "Harder, Better, Faster, Stronger (Alive 2007)"	2007	—	—	—	—	47	—	35	—	Alive 2007
"The Game Has Changed"	2010	—	—	—	—	—	—	32	—	Tron: Legacy soundtrack
"The Game of Love"	2013	—	— (Note: "The Game of Love" did not enter the Australian ARIA Singles Chart but peaked at number nine on the ARIA Streaming Tracks Chart.)	—	—	—	— (Note: "The Game of Love" did not enter the UK Singles Chart, but peaked at number 12 on the UK Streaming Chart.)	—	—	Random Access Memories
"Giorgio by Moroder"	2013	54	— (Note: "Giorgio by Moroder" did not enter the Australian ARIA Singles Chart but peaked at number 11 on the ARIA Streaming Tracks Chart.)	75	57	—	— (Note: "Giorgio by Moroder" did not enter the UK Singles Chart, but peaked at number 13 on the UK Streaming Chart.)	—	22	Random Access Memories
"Within"	2013	109	— (Note: "Within" did not enter the Australian ARIA Singles Chart but peaked at number 14 on the ARIA Streaming Tracks Chart.)	—	—	—	— (Note: "Within" did not enter the UK Singles Chart, but peaked at number 18 on the UK Streaming Chart.)	—	39	Random Access Memories
"Touch" (featuring Paul Williams)	2013	171	— (Note: "Touch" did not enter the Australian ARIA Singles Chart but peaked at number 12 on the ARIA Streaming Tracks Chart.)	—	—	—	— (Note: "Touch" did not enter the UK Singles Chart, but peaked at number 16 on the UK Streaming Chart.)	—	36	Random Access Memories
"Beyond"	2013	115	— (Note: "Beyond" did not enter the Australian ARIA Singles Chart but peaked at number 16 on the ARIA Streaming Tracks Chart.)	—	—	—	— (Note: "Beyond" did not enter the UK Singles Chart, but peaked at number 21 on the UK Streaming Chart.)	—	38	Random Access Memories
"Motherboard"	2013	—	— (Note: "Motherboard" did not enter the Australian ARIA Singles Chart but peaked at number 20 on the ARIA Streaming Tracks Chart.)	—	—	—	— (Note: "Motherboard" did not enter the UK Singles Chart, but peaked at number 29 on the UK Streaming Chart.)	—	43	Random Access Memories
"Fragments of Time" (featuring Todd Edwards)	2013	100	— (Note: "Fragments of Time" did not enter the Australian ARIA Singles Chart but peaked at number 23 on the ARIA Streaming Tracks Chart.)	—	—	—	— (Note: "Fragments of Time" did not enter the UK Singles Chart, but peaked at number 31 on the UK Streaming Chart.)	—	28	Random Access Memories
"Contact"	2013	46	— (Note: "Contact" did not enter the Australian ARIA Singles Chart but peaked at number 21 on the ARIA Streaming Tracks Chart.)	—	—	—	— (Note: "Contact" did not enter the UK Singles Chart, but peaked at number 31 on the UK Streaming Chart.)	—	34	Random Access Memories
"—" denotes a recording that did not chart or was not released in that territory.

== Writing, production, and remix credits ==
List of production and remix work for other artists, with other performing artists and co-producers, showing year released and album name
Title	Year	Performing artist(s)	Co-producer(s)	Album
"Life Is Sweet" (Daft Punk remix)	1994	The Chemical Brothers	The Chemical Brothers	None
"ß Wax"	1995	Daft Punk, DJ Kevin	DJ Kevin	Two Years Together
"Get Funky Get Down" (Daft Punk remix)	1995	The Micronauts	Christophe Monier, George Issakidis	None
"Disco Cubizm" (Daft Punk remix)	1996	I:Cube	Nicolas Chaix	None
"Forget About the World" (Daft Punk remix)	1996	Gabrielle	The Boilerhouse Boys	Musique Vol. 1 1993–2005
"Chord Memory" (Daft Punk remix)	1996	Ian Pooley	Ian Pooley	Musique Vol. 1 1993–2005
"Mothership Reconnection" (Daft Punk remix)	1998	Scott Grooves, Parliament-Funkadelic	Scott Grooves	Musique Vol. 1 1993–2005
"Take Me Out" (Daft Punk remix)	2004	Franz Ferdinand	Tore Johansson	Evil Action
"HeartBreaker"	2006	Teriyaki Boyz	None	Beef or Chicken
"Hypnotize U"	2010	N.E.R.D.	The Neptunes	Nothing
"On Sight"	2013	Kanye West	Kanye West, Mike Dean, Benji B	Yeezus
"Black Skinhead"	2013	Kanye West	Kanye West, Gesaffelstein, Brodinski, Mike Dean, Lupe Fiasco, No ID, Jack Donoghue, Noah Goldstein	Yeezus
"I Am a God"	2013	Kanye West	Kanye West, Mike Dean, Hudson Mohawke	Yeezus
"Send It Up"	2013	Kanye West	Kanye West, Gesaffelstein, Brodinski, Mike Dean, Arca	Yeezus
"Gust of Wind"	2014	Pharrell Williams	Writing credit and vocals only	Girl
"Starboy"	2016	The Weeknd	Doc McKinney, Cirkut, The Weeknd	Starboy
"I Feel It Coming"	2016	The Weeknd	Doc McKinney, Cirkut, The Weeknd	Starboy
"I Gotta Try You Girl" (Daft Punk edit)	2016 (Note: Originally produced 2013)	Junior Kimbrough	Matthew Johnson, Bruce Watson	None
"Overnight"	2017	Parcels	Patrick Hetherington, Noah Hill, Louie Swain, Jules Crommelin, Anatole Serre	None

== Music videos ==
List of music videos, showing year released and directors
Title	Year	Director(s)
"Rollin' & Scratchin" (Live)	1997	Philip Richardson
"Da Funk"	1997	Spike Jonze
"Around the World"	1997	Michel Gondry
"Burnin'"	1997	Seb Janiak
"Revolution 909"	1998	Roman Coppola
"Fresh"	1999	Daft Punk
"One More Time"	2001	Kazuhisa Takenouchi
"Aerodynamic"	2001	Kazuhisa Takenouchi
"Digital Love"	2001	Kazuhisa Takenouchi
"Harder, Better, Faster, Stronger"	2001	Kazuhisa Takenouchi
"Something About Us (Love Theme from Interstella 5555)"	2003	Kazuhisa Takenouchi
"Robot Rock"	2005	Daft Punk
"Technologic"	2005	Daft Punk
"The Prime Time of Your Life"	2006	Tony Gardner
"Robot Rock (Daft Punk Maximum Overdrive Mix)"	2006	Daft Punk, Cédric Hervet
"Around The World/Harder, Better, Faster, Stronger (Alive 2007)"	2007	Olivier Gondry
"Derezzed"	2010	Warren Fu
"Lose Yourself to Dance" (featuring Pharrell Williams)	2013	Daft Punk, Warren Fu, Paul Hahn, Cédric Hervet
"Instant Crush" (featuring Julian Casablancas)	2013	Warren Fu
"The Writing of Fragments of Time" (featuring Todd Edwards)	2023	Cédric Hervet
"Infinity Repeating" (featuring Julian Casablancas & The Voidz)	2023	Warren Fu
"Television Rules the Nation"	2025	Daft Punk
"Contact"	2025	Video created by Epic Games and Magnopus
"Human After All"	2026	Daft Punk

== See also ==
- List of songs recorded by Daft Punk
