= List of awards and nominations received by Daft Punk =

Daft Punk awards and nominations
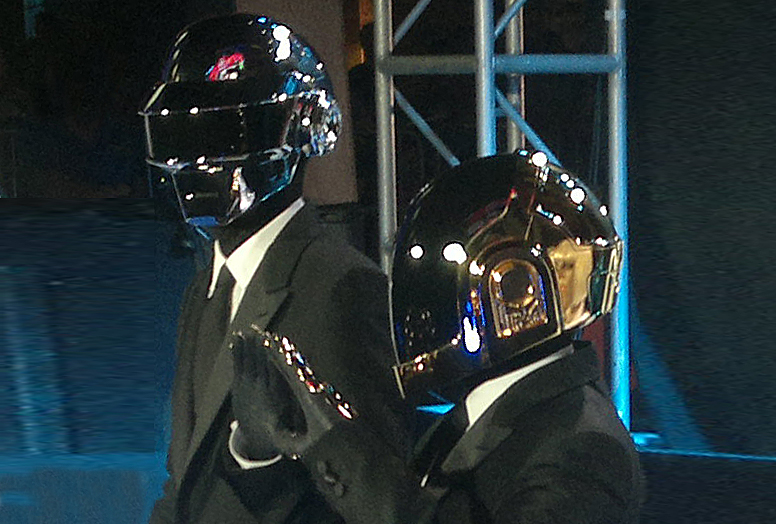
- Daft Punk in 2010
Awards and nominations
Award	Wins	Nominations
American Music Awards	0	1
Billboard	2	4
Brit	1	5
Grammy	8	14
MTV Europe	1	8
MTV VMA	0	2
Teen Choice	0	3
BMI Awards	1	1
NRJ Music Awards (FRA)	0	4
Victoires de la Musique (FRA)	0	1

Totals (Note: Certain award groups do not simply award one winner. They acknowledge several different recipients, have runners-up, and have third place. Since this is a specific recognition and is different from losing an award, runner-up mentions are considered wins in this award tally. For simplification and to avoid errors, each award in this list has been presumed to have had a prior nomination.)
- Wins: 15
- Nominations: 45

Daft Punk were a French electronic music duo that has received numerous awards and accolades. Their debut album Homework features the singles "Da Funk" and "Around the World", which led to Grammy Award nominations in 1998 and 1999 respectively for Best Dance Recording. In 2002, Daft Punk received nominations for the tracks "One More Time" and "Short Circuit" from their second studio album Discovery; the album as a whole was also nominated for a Brit Award that same year. The duo's third studio album Human After All was nominated for the Grammy Award for Best Dance/Electronica Album in 2007. Daft Punk would go on to win their first Grammys in 2009 for their live album Alive 2007 and its single "Harder, Better, Faster, Stronger (Alive 2007)", in the respective categories of Best Electronic/Dance Album and Best Dance Recording.

The duo's Tron: Legacy film soundtrack received an award for "Best Original Score" from the Austin Film Critics Association, was nominated for Score of the Year and Breakout Composer of the Year, and won Best Original Score for a Fantasy/Science Fiction/Horror Film by the International Film Music Critics Association. The soundtrack album was also nominated for Best Score Soundtrack Album for Visual Media at the 54th Grammy Awards. Daft Punk's fourth studio album Random Access Memories received Grammys for Album of the Year, Best Dance/Electronica Album and Best Engineered Album, Non-Classical for the 56th Annual Grammy Awards. The lead single "Get Lucky" also won for Record of the Year and Best Pop Duo/Group Performance. "Get Lucky" had previously been nominated for Best Song of the Summer at the 2013 MTV Video Music Awards and Best Song at the 2013 MTV Europe Music Awards. As a featured artist with The Weeknd, Daft Punk won two awards: Best Video for "Starboy" at the 2016 MTV Europe Music Awards, and Song of the Year for "I Feel It Coming" at the 2018 BMI R&B/Hip-Hop Awards.

== American Music Awards ==
The American Music Awards are an annual awards show from the American Broadcasting Company held every year. Daft Punk received one nomination.

Year	Nominee / work	Award	Result
2013	Daft Punk	Favorite Electronic Dance Music Artist	Nominated

== Austin Film Critics Association ==
The Austin Film Critics Association (AFCA) is an organization of professional film critics from Austin, Texas. Daft Punk received one nomination.

Year	Nominee / work	Award	Result
2010	Daft Punk (for Tron: Legacy)	Best Original Score	Won

== Berlin Music Video Awards ==
Year	Nominee / work	Award	Result
2024	Daft Punk	Best Animation	Nominated

== Billboard Music Awards ==
Year	Nominee / work	Award	Result
2011	Tron: Legacy	Top Dance Album	Nominated
2014	Daft Punk	Top Dance/Electronic Artist	Won
2014	Random Access Memories	Top Dance/Electronic Album	Won
2014	"Get Lucky" (featuring Pharrell Williams)	Top Streaming Song (Audio)	Nominated
2014	"Get Lucky" (featuring Pharrell Williams)	Top Dance/Electronic Song	Nominated
2017	"Starboy"	Top Collaboration	Nominated
2017	"Starboy"	Top Streaming Song (Audio)	Nominated
2017	"Starboy"	Top R&B Song	Nominated
2017	"Starboy"	Top R&B Collaboration	Nominated
2017	"I Feel It Coming"	Top R&B Collaboration	Nominated

== Brit Awards ==
The Brit Awards are the British Phonographic Industry's annual pop music awards. Daft Punk has received five nominations; one of which resulted in an award.

Year	Nominee / work	Award	Result
1998	Daft Punk	International Breakthrough Act	Nominated
1998	Daft Punk	International Group	Nominated
2002	Daft Punk	International Group	Nominated
2002	Discovery	International Album	Nominated
2014	Daft Punk	International Group	Won

== BMI R&B/Hip-Hop Awards ==
The BMI Awards are Broadcast Music, Inc.'s annual music awards. Daft Punk was directly named for an award (as a featured artist).

Year	Nominee / work	Award	Result
2018	"I Feel It Coming" (with The Weeknd)	Song of The Year	Won

== DJ Magazine's Top 100 DJs ==
DJ Magazine's top 100 DJs list is an annual poll which fans ranks their favourite DJs based on their previous years work. Daft Punk has been in the top 40 on 5 occasions.

Year	Position	Notes	Ref.
2007	72	New Entry	
2008	38	—N/a	
2009	33	—N/a	
2010	44	—N/a	
2011	28	—N/a	
2012	44	—N/a	
2013	22	—N/a	
2014	43	—N/a	
2015	69	—N/a	
2016	72	—N/a	

== GAFFA Awards ==
=== Denmark GAFFA Awards ===
Delivered since 1991, the GAFFA Awards are a Danish award that rewards popular music by the magazine of the same name.

Year	Nominee / work	Award	Result	Ref.
1997	Daft Punk	Foreign New Act	Nominated	
2013	"Get Lucky" (with Pharrell Williams)	Best Foreign Song	Won	
2013	Daft Punk	Best Foreign Band	Won	

=== Sweden GAFFA Awards ===
Delivered since 2010, the GAFFA Awards (Swedish: GAFFA Priset) are a Swedish award that rewards popular music awarded by the magazine of the same name.

Year	Nominee / work	Award	Result	Ref.
2013	Daft Punk	Best Foreign Band	Won	
2013	"Get Lucky" (with Pharrell Williams)	Best Foreign Song	Won	

== Grammy Awards ==
The Grammy Awards are awarded annually by the National Academy of Recording Arts and Sciences of the United States. Daft Punk has received fourteen nominations; eight of which resulted in awards.

Year	Nominee / work	Award	Result
1998	"Da Funk"	Best Dance Recording	Nominated
1999	"Around the World"	Best Dance Recording	Nominated
2002	"One More Time"	Best Dance Recording	Nominated
2002	"Short Circuit"	Best Pop Instrumental Performance	Nominated
2006	Human After All	Best Electronic/Dance Album	Nominated
2009	Alive 2007	Best Electronic/Dance Album	Won
2009	"Harder, Better, Faster, Stronger (Alive 2007)"	Best Dance Recording	Won
2012	Tron: Legacy	Best Score Soundtrack for Visual Media	Nominated
2014	Random Access Memories	Album of the Year	Won
2014	Random Access Memories	Best Dance/Electronic Album	Won
2014	Random Access Memories	Best Engineered Album, Non-Classical	Won
2014	"Get Lucky"	Record of the Year	Won
2014	"Get Lucky"	Best Pop Duo/Group Performance	Won
2018	Starboy (as producer and featured artist)	Best Urban Contemporary Album	Won

== International Dance Music Awards ==
The International Dance Music Award was established in 1985. It is a part of the Winter Music Conference, a weeklong electronic music event held annually. Daft Punk has won six awards from thirteen nominations.

Year	Nominee / work	Award	Result
1998	"Around the World"	Best Dance Video	Won
1998	Daft Punk	Best New Dance Artist (Group)	Won
1998	Daft Punk	Best Dance Artist (Group)	Won
2002	Daft Punk	Best Dance Artist (Group)	Won
2006	Daft Punk	Best Dance Artist (Group)	Nominated
2008	Daft Punk	Best Dance Artist (Group)	Won
2009	Daft Punk	Best Artist (Group)	Nominated
2011	Daft Punk	Best Artist (Group)	Nominated
2014	Daft Punk	Best Artist (Group)	Nominated
2014	Random Access Memories	Best Full Length Studio Recording	Nominated
2014	"Get Lucky"	Best Commercial / Pop Dance Track	Won
2014	"Get Lucky"	Best Featured Vocalist Performance	Nominated
2014	"Get Lucky"	Best Music Video	Nominated

== Las Vegas Film Critics Society ==
The Las Vegas Film Critics Society (LVFCS) is a non-profit, progressive organization dedicated to the advancement and preservation of film and is composed of selected print, television, radio and internet film critics in the Las Vegas and Reno area. Daft Punk received one nomination.

Year	Nominee / work	Award	Result
2010	Daft Punk (for Tron: Legacy)	Best Original Score	Nominated

== MTV Europe Music Awards ==
The MTV Europe Music Awards were created in 1994 by MTV Europe. Daft Punk has received nine nominations, one which resulted in an award (as a featured artist).

Year	Nominee / work	Award	Result
1997	"Around the World"	Best Video	Nominated
1997	Daft Punk	Best Dance	Nominated
2001	Daft Punk	Best Dance	Nominated
2001	Daft Punk	French Act	Nominated
2001	www.daftpunk.com	Web Award	Nominated
2013	"Get Lucky" (featuring Pharrell Williams)	Best Song	Nominated
2013	Daft Punk	Best Electronic	Nominated
2013	Daft Punk	Best French Act	Nominated
2016	"Starboy" (with The Weeknd)	Best Video	Won

== MTV Video Music Awards ==
The MTV Video Music Awards were created in 1984 by MTV Networks to honor the best music videos of the year. Daft Punk received two nominations.

Year	Nominee / work	Award	Result
1997	"Da Funk"	Breakthrough Video	Nominated
1997	"Around the World"	International Viewer's Choice—MTV Europe	Nominated
2013	"Get Lucky" (featuring Pharrell Williams)	Best Song of the Summer	Nominated

== MVPA Awards ==
Year	Nominee / work	Award	Result
2006	"Technologic"	Best Electronic Video	Won

== NME Awards ==
Year	Nominee / work	Award	Result	Ref.
1998	"Da Funk"	Best Dance Single	Nominated	
2002	Daft Punk	Best Dance Act	Nominated	

== Porin ==
Year	Nominee / work	Award	Result
2014	"Get Lucky" (featuring Pharrell Williams)	Best International Song	Won
2014	Random Access Memories	Best International Album	Nominated

== Saturn Awards ==
The Saturn Award is an award presented annually by the Academy of Science Fiction, Fantasy and Horror Films to honor the top works mainly in science fiction, fantasy, and horror in film, television, and home video. Daft Punk received one nomination.

Year	Nominee / work	Award	Result
2010	Tron: Legacy	Best Music	Nominated

== Teen Choice Awards ==
The Teen Choice Awards is an annual awards show created by Fox Broadcasting Company that honors film, television, music, sports, fashion, voted by teen viewers aged 13 to 19. Daft Punk received three nominations.

Year	Nominee / work	Award	Result
2013	"Get Lucky"	Choice Music: Single by a Group	Won
2013	"Get Lucky"	Choice Summer: Song	Won
2013	Daft Punk	Choice Summer: Group	Won

== NRJ Music Awards ==
NRJ Music Awards in France

Year	Nominee / work	Award	Result
2002	Discovery	International album	Nominated
2002	Daft Punk	International group	Nominated
2014	Daft Punk	French Group/Duo of the Year	Won

== Victoires de la Musique ==
The Victoires de la Musique is an annual French award ceremony.

Year	Nominee / work	Award	Result
2008	Alive 2006/2007	Musical / Tour / Concert	Nominated
