= List of songs in DJ Hero =

DJ Hero is a rhythm video game and a spin-off of the Guitar Hero series. The game was developed by FreeStyleGames and published by Activision worldwide in October 2009 for the PlayStation 2 and 3, Wii, and Xbox 360 consoles. The game is based on turntablism, requiring the use of a special game controller that includes a turntable surface with three buttons, a crossfader bar, and an effects dial, in addition to other controller buttons used to manipulate in-game menus. In a manner similar to Guitar Hero, players use the turntable controller to mimic the actions of a disc jockey (DJ), such as scratching and crossfading between two different songs, as graphical representations of these actions scroll down on screen towards the player in time with the music. Unlike previous Guitar Hero games, there is no performance meter, and instead players are simply challenged to obtain the best score possible in order to earn stars (from zero to five for each mix) to unlock new songs, venues, and characters. The player can attempt these songs at one of four difficulties (Easy to Expert), with higher difficulties providing more actions for the player to perform within the song.

The game's on-disc soundtrack contains 94 mixes, most made from two songs; over 100 individual songs are incorporated into these mixes. Some mixes feature only a single song mixed with itself. Ten songs on disc include a guitar track that can be played using a Guitar Hero or other compatible controller alongside the DJ mixing player in the game's DJ vs Guitar mode. The game supports additional content through downloadable tracks from the game consoles' respective online stores. While most on-disc mixes were created by FreeStyleGames, several DJs have contributed mixes to the game, including Grandmaster Flash, DJ Shadow, DJ AM, DJ Z-Trip, DJ Jazzy Jeff, and the Scratch Perverts; other DJ artists provided future downloadable content.

== On-disc soundtrack ==
The on-disc soundtrack contains 93 mixes, each featuring one or two songs. These are arranged across 24 setlists, ordered roughly by difficulty of the mix, with more difficult mixes appearing later in the game. To access later tiers, the player must earn a pre-set number of stars on previous mixes at any difficulty. All mixes are immediately available to play in the Quickplay and competitive modes. The table below lists the mixes in the game, including the two songs that contribute to their mix as well as their individual artists; the mix artist that created the mix; whether the song is playable in the game's DJ vs Guitar mode; and the career tier in which the song is located.

Reviewers found the on-disc soundtrack to be strong; Daemon Hatfield of IGN believed that "the entire soundtrack is superb and could easily stand on its own outside the game". Matt Helgeson of Game Informer considered it to be one of the "most adventurous" soundtracks of any music game, and said though it often relied too much on pop hits, it remained true to the spirit of the DJ mix scene. Johnny Minkley thought the game to have "vital, varied, surprising and vast musical content" and to be a fresh experience compared to previous music games. The game did not sell well in the first month after its release; Ben Kuchera of Ars Technica attributed the low sales of the game partially to its soundtrack. While Kuchera felt the soundtrack was good, he asserted that individual songs were unrecognizable because of modifications made to them for the mixes, and that they were more difficult to adjust to within the gameplay itself.

Song 1 title	Artist 1	Song 2 title	Artist 2	Mix artist	Guitar part?	Level
"Ace of Spades"	Motörhead	"Groundhog"	Noisia	FreeStyleGames	Yes	Born To Rock
"Ain't No Love in the Heart of the City"	Bobby "Blue" Bland	"Fuzz and Them"	Connie Price & The Keystones	FreeStyleGames	No	Scratching The Surface
"Ain't No Love in the Heart of the City"	Bobby "Blue" Bland	"How Do U Want It"	2Pac	FreeStyleGames	No	Digging Deeper
"All Eyez on Me"	2Pac	"Bitter Sweet Symphony (Instrumental)"	The Aranbee Pop Symphony Orchestra	FreeStyleGames	No	Breaking Needles
"Another One Bites the Dust"	Queen	"Brass Monkey"	Beastie Boys	DJ Z-Trip	No	DJ Z-Trip Presents
"Another One Bites the Dust"	Queen	"Da Funk"	Daft Punk	FreeStyleGames	No	Scratching The Surface
"Around the World"	Daft Punk	"Bust a Move"	Young MC	FreeStyleGames	No	Daft Punk Record Bag
"Beats"	Shlomo	"The Big Beat	Billy Squier	FreeStyleGames	No	DJ Yoda Presents
"Beats and Pieces"	The Scratch Perverts	n/a	n/a	The Scratch Perverts	No	Scratch Perverts Presents
"Beverly Hills"	Weezer	"Fresh Rhymes and Videotape"	Evidence featuring The Alchemist, Aceyalone, Rakaa & 88-Keys	FreeStyleGames	Yes	Thrashed And Mashed
"The Big Beat"	Billy Squier	"Lapdance"	N.E.R.D.	FreeStyleGames	Yes	Thrashed And Mashed
"Bitter Sweet Symphony (Instrumental)"	The Aranbee Pop Symphony Orchestra	"Rock the Bells"	LL Cool J	DJ Jazzy Jeff	No	DJ Jazzy Jeff Presents
"Boom Boom Pow"	The Black Eyed Peas	"Satisfaction"	Benny Benassi	FreeStyleGames	No	Digging Deeper
"Boom"	Grandmaster Flash	"Tap"	Grandmaster Flash	Grandmaster Flash	No	Grandmaster Flash Presents
"Bring the Noise 20XX"	Public Enemy featuring Zakk Wylde	"Genesis"	Justice	DJ Z-Trip	No	DJ Z-Trip Presents
"Bring the Noise 20XX (DJ-Guitar Mix)"	Public Enemy featuring Zakk Wylde	n/a	n/a	FreeStyleGames	Yes	Born To Rock
"Bustin' Loose"	Chuck Brown & The Soul Searchers	"Bust a Move"	Young MC	FreeStyleGames	No	Extended Play
"Bustin' Loose"	Chuck Brown & The Soul Searchers	"Time of the Season"	The Zombies	DJ Shadow	No	DJ Shadow Presents
"Change Clothes"	Jay-Z featuring Pharrell Williams	"All Eyez on Me"	2Pac	FreeStyleGames	No	Jay-Z Mixtape
"Da Funk"	Daft Punk	"Strange Enough"	N.A.S.A. featuring Karen O, ODB & Fatlip	FreeStyleGames	No	Daft Punk Record Bag
"Day 'n' Nite"	Kid Cudi	"Boom Boom Pow"	The Black Eyed Peas	FreeStyleGames	No	Revenge Of The Boom Bop
"Disco Inferno"	50 Cent	"Last Night a DJ Saved My Life"	Indeep	FreeStyleGames	No	Breaking Needles
"Disco Inferno"	50 Cent	"Let's Dance"	David Bowie	FreeStyleGames	No	Cut And Paste
"Disturbia"	Rihanna	"Control"	Kid Sister	FreeStyleGames	No	Digging Deeper
"Disturbia"	Rihanna	"Disco Inferno"	The Trammps	FreeStyleGames	No	In The Groove
"Disturbia"	Rihanna	"Somebody Told Me"	The Killers	FreeStyleGames	Yes	Thrashed And Mashed
"The Edge"	David Axelrod	"Eric B. Is President"	Eric B. & Rakim	FreeStyleGames	No	Extended Play
"Excuse Me Miss"	Jay-Z featuring Pharrell Williams	"Give It to Me Baby"	Rick James	FreeStyleGames	No	Jay-Z Mixtape
"Feel Good Inc."	Gorillaz	"Atomic"	Blondie	FreeStyleGames	No	Party Rockin'
"Fight! Smash! Win!"	Street Sweeper Social Club	"Intergalactic"	Beastie Boys	FreeStyleGames	Yes	Born To Rock
"Fix Up, Look Sharp"	Dizzee Rascal	"Genesis"	Justice	FreeStyleGames	No	In The Groove
"Fix Up, Look Sharp"	Dizzee Rascal	"Organ Donor (Extended Overhaul)"	DJ Shadow	FreeStyleGames	No	Hip Hop Rules
"Good Thang"	Q-Tip	"The Big Beat"	Billy Squier	J.Period	No	J.Period Presents
"Groundhog (Beat Juggle)"	Noisia	n/a	n/a	The Scratch Perverts	No	Scratch Perverts Presents, The Vinyl Cut
"Here Comes My DJ"	Grandmaster Flash featuring DJ Kool & DJ Demo	"Cars"	Gary Numan	Grandmaster Flash	No	Grandmaster Flash Presents
"Here's a Little Somethin' for Ya"	Beastie Boys	"The Number Song (2009 Version)"	DJ Shadow	DJ Shadow	No	DJ Shadow Presents
"Hollaback Girl"	Gwen Stefani	"Feel Good Inc."	Gorillaz	FreeStyleGames	No	In The Groove
"Hollaback Girl"	Gwen Stefani	"Give It to Me Baby"	Rick James	FreeStyleGames	No	On The Wheels Of Steel
"Hollaback Girl"	Gwen Stefani	"Last Night a DJ Saved My Life"	Indeep	DJ AM	No	DJ AM Presents
"How Ya Like Me Now"	Kool Moe Dee	"I Like to Move It"	Reel 2 Real featuring The Mad Stuntman	FreeStyleGames	No	In The Groove
"I Heard It Through the Grapevine"	Marvin Gaye	"Feel Good Inc."	Gorillaz	FreeStyleGames	No	On The Wheels Of Steel
"I Heard It Through the Grapevine"	Marvin Gaye	"Let's Dance"	David Bowie	FreeStyleGames	No	Breaking Needles, The Vinyl Cut
"I Want You Back"	The Jackson 5	"Just to Get a Rep"	Gang Starr	DJ Yoda	No	DJ Yoda Presents
"I Want You Back"	The Jackson 5	"Semi-Charmed Life"	Third Eye Blind	FreeStyleGames	No	Digging Deeper
"I Want You Back"	The Jackson 5	"Semi-Charmed Life"	Third Eye Blind	FreeStyleGames	Yes	Thrashed And Mashed
"Ice Ice Baby"	Vanilla Ice	"Straight Up"	Paula Abdul	FreeStyleGames	No	Extended Play
"Ice Ice Baby"	Vanilla Ice	"U Can't Touch This"	MC Hammer	FreeStyleGames	No	Hip Hop Rules
"Insane in the Brain"	Cypress Hill	"Spooky"	Classics IV	FreeStyleGames	No	Party Rockin'
"Insane in the Brain"	Cypress Hill	"The Edge"	David Axelrod	FreeStyleGames	No	DJ Jazzy Jeff Presents
"Intergalactic"	Beastie Boys	"Rapture"	Blondie	FreeStyleGames	No	Cut And Paste
"Izzo (H.O.V.A.)"	Jay-Z	"I Want You Back"	The Jackson 5	FreeStyleGames	No	Jay-Z Mixtape
"Izzo (H.O.V.A.)"	Jay-Z	"My Name Is"	Eminem	FreeStyleGames	No	Jay-Z Mixtape
"Jack of Spades"	Boogie Down Productions	"Let's Dance"	David Bowie	DJ Shadow	No	DJ Shadow Presents
"Jayou"	Jurassic 5	"Rockit"	Herbie Hancock	FreeStyleGames	No	Tearing Up Wax
"Jayou"	Jurassic 5	"The Big Beat"	Billy Squier	FreeStyleGames	No	Hip Hop Rules
"Juke Box Hero"	Foreigner	"DJ Hero"	DJ Z-Trip featuring Murs	DJ Z-Trip	Yes	Born To Rock
"Juke Box Hero"	Foreigner	"DJ Hero"	DJ Z-Trip featuring Murs	DJ Z-Trip	No	DJ Z-Trip Presents
"Just to Get a Rep"	Gang Starr	"Shook Ones part II"	Mobb Deep	J.Period	No	J.Period Presents
"Last Night a DJ Saved My Life"	Indeep	"Word Up!"	Cameo	FreeStyleGames	No	Revenge Of The Boom Bap
"Lee Majors Come Again"	Beastie Boys	"Da Funk"	Daft Punk	Cut Chemist	No	DJ Shadow Presents
"Lookin' at Me"	Wale	"Hey Mama"	The Black Eyed Peas ft. Tippa Irie	FreeStyleGames	No	Extended Play
"Megamix 1" (Around the World, Technologic, Television Rules The Nation)	Daft Punk	n/a	n/a	FreeStyleGames	No	Daft Punk Record Bag
"Megamix 2" (Robot Rock, Da Funk, Short Circuit)	Daft Punk	n/a	n/a	FreeStyleGames	No	Daft Punk Record Bag
"Monkey Wrench"	Foo Fighters	"Sabotage"	Beastie Boys	FreeStyleGames	Yes	Born To Rock
"Mr. Big Stuff"	Jean Knight	"Born to Roll"	Masta Ace	FreeStyleGames	No	Scratching The Surface
"My Name Is"	Eminem	"Loser"	Beck	FreeStyleGames	No	On The Wheels Of Steel
"Nothing But You"	Paul van Dyk	"I Can't Stop (David Penn Remix)"	Sandy Rivera featuring David Penn	FreeStyleGames	No	Tearing Up Wax
"Paper Planes"	M.I.A.	"Eric B. Is President"	Eric B. & Rakim	The Scratch Perverts	No	Scratch Perverts Present
"Paper Planes"	M.I.A.	"Lookin' at Me"	Wale	FreeStyleGames	No	Breaking Needles
"Play That Funky Music"	Wild Cherry	"Just to Get a Rep"	Gang Starr	FreeStyleGames	Yes	Thrashed And Mashed
"Poison"	Bell Biv DeVoe	"Intergalactic"	Beastie Boys	DJ AM	No	DJ AM Presents
"Poison"	Bell Biv DeVoe	"Word Up!"	Cameo	FreeStyleGames	No	Party Rockin'
"Poison (Beat Juggle)"	Bell Biv DeVoe	n/a	n/a	FreeStyleGames	No	DJ AM Presents
"Put Your Hands Up 4 Detroit"	Fedde Le Grand	"I Can't Stop (David Penn Remix)"	Sandy Rivera featuring David Penn	FreeStyleGames	No	On The Wheels Of Steel
"Robot Rock"	Daft Punk	"Al Naafiysh (The Soul)"	Hashim	The Scratch Perverts	No	Scratch Perverts Presents
"Robot Rock"	Daft Punk	"We Will Rock You"	Queen	FreeStyleGames	No	Daft Punk Record Bag
"Rockit"	Herbie Hancock	"Lapdance"	N.E.R.D.	Grandmaster Flash	No	Grandmaster Flash Presents
"Rockit (Beat Juggle)"	Herbie Hancock	n/a	n/a	FreeStyleGames	No	The Vinyl Cut
"Satisfaction"	Benny Benassi	"Elements of Life"	Tiësto	FreeStyleGames	No	The Vinyl Cut
"Short Circuit"	Daft Punk	"Jack of Spades"	Boogie Down Productions	FreeStyleGames	No	Daft Punk Record Bag
"Shout"	Tears for Fears	"Eric B. Is President"	Eric B. & Rakim	DJ Jazzy Jeff	No	DJ Jazzy Jeff Presents
"Shout"	Tears for Fears	"Pjanoo"	Eric Prydz	FreeStyleGames	No	Party Rockin
"Shout"	Tears for Fears	"Six Days (Remix)"	DJ Shadow featuring Mos Def	FreeStyleGames	No	Revenge Of The Boom Bop
"Shut 'Em Down"	Public Enemy	"Where It's At"	Beck	FreeStyleGames	No	Revenge Of The Boom Bap
"Six Days (Remix)"	DJ Shadow	"Annie's Horn"	D-Code	FreeStyleGames	No	Tearing Up Wax, The Vinyl Cut
"Somebody Told Me"	The Killers	"Pjanoo"	Eric Prydz	FreeStyleGames	No	Cut And Paste
"Strange Enough"	N.A.S.A. featuring Karen O, ODB, & Fatlip	"Theme from Shaft"	Isaac Hayes	FreeStyleGames	No	Tearing Up Wax
"Technologic"	Daft Punk	"Cars"	Gary Numan	FreeStyleGames	No	Daft Punk Record Bag
"Television Rules the Nation"	Daft Punk	"Hella Good"	No Doubt	FreeStyleGames	No	Daft Punk Record Bag
"Tutti Frutti"	Little Richard	"Beats"	Shlomo	DJ Yoda	No	DJ Yoda Presents
"Universal Mind Control"	Common	"Jeep Ass Gutter (Aaron LaCrate & Debonair Samir RMX)"	Masta Ace	The Scratch Perverts	No	Scratch Perverts Presents
"Where It's At"	Beck	"Six Days (Remix)"	DJ Shadow featuring Mos Def	FreeStyleGames	No	Cut And Paste
"Zulu Nation Throwdown"	Afrika Bambaataa	"Get Down"	Freedom Express	FreeStyleGames	No	Hip Hop Rules

== Downloadable content ==
New mixes were added regularly to DJ Hero through downloadable content that could be purchased on the console's respective online stores; content was made available on the day of the game's release. Unlike Guitar Hero games' downloadable content, which costs approximately US$2 per track, each mix costs approximately $3 to download because of the additional effort needed to create the mixes. Furthermore, mixes are provided only as bundles for PlayStation 3 and Xbox 360 users; the Wii's storefront prevents the selling of bundled packages; instead, each track is offered individually. Critics viewed the lack of individual song selection on the PlayStation 3 and Xbox 360 platforms as a way of limiting consumers' choice, as previous downloadable songs for games such as Guitar Hero allow players on these systems to select individual tracks to purchase from a bundle. The long time between the second downloadable pack (in November 2009) and the third pack (in March 2010) was also believed to be the result of a last-ditch effort by Activision to support the game, and that the few packs released did not meet expectations for the game. All of the DJ Hero DLC packs (along with the DLC of Guitar Hero, Band Hero) were taken offline on March 31, 2014, and are no longer available for download. However, they can be reinstalled if the player has downloaded any DLC pack before the removal.

Song 1 title	Artist 1	Song 2 title	Artist 2	Mix artist	Guitar part?	Mix pack	Release date
"All of Me"	50 Cent featuring Mary J. Blige	"Radio Ga Ga"	Queen	FreeStyleGames	No	Extended Mix Pack 01	Oct. 27, 2009
"DARE"	Gorillaz	"Can't Truss It"	Public Enemy	FreeStyleGames	No	Extended Mix Pack 01	Oct. 27, 2009
"When Love Takes Over" (Beat Juggle)	David Guetta featuring Kelly Rowland	n/a	n/a	David Guetta	No	David Guetta Mix Pack 01	Nov. 24, 2009
"Sexy Chick" (Beat Juggle)	David Guetta featuring Akon	n/a	n/a	David Guetta	No	David Guetta Mix Pack 01	Nov. 24, 2009
"On The Dance Floor" (Beat Juggle)	David Guetta featuring will.i.am and apl.de.ap	n/a	n/a	David Guetta	No	David Guetta Mix Pack 01	Nov. 24, 2009
"Shake That"	Eminem featuring Nate Dogg	"Show Me What You Got"	Jay-Z	FreeStyleGames	No	Jay-Z vs. Eminem Mix Pack	Mar. 18, 2010^{a}
"Without Me"	Eminem	"Encore"	Jay-Z	FreeStyleGames	No	Jay-Z vs. Eminem Mix Pack	Mar. 18, 2010^{a}
"Can I Get A..."	Jay-Z	"Lose Yourself"	Eminem	FreeStyleGames	No	Jay-Z vs. Eminem Mix Pack	Mar. 18, 2010^{a}
"Sandstorm"	Darude	"Higher State of Consciousness (Tweekin' Acid Funk Mix)"	Josh Wink	FreeStyleGames	No	Domination Pack	Apr. 29, 2010
"Wolfgang's Fifth Symphony" (Beat Juggle)	Wolfgang Gartner	"n/a"	n/a	FreeStyleGames	No	Domination Pack	Apr. 29, 2010
"Red Mist VIP" (Beat Juggle)	Danny Byrd	"n/a"	n/a	FreeStyleGames	No	Domination Pack	Apr. 29, 2010
"Just Dance"	Lady Gaga	"Ghosts 'n' Stuff"	Deadmau5	FreeStyleGames	No	Single	June 8, 2010^{b}
"Poker Face"	Lady Gaga	"Girls on Film"	Duran Duran	FreeStyleGames	No	Dance Party Mix Pack	June 29, 2010
"Buttons" (Beat Juggle)	Pussycat Dolls feat. Snoop Dogg	"n/a"	n/a	FreeStyleGames	No	Dance Party Mix Pack	June 29, 2010
"SOS" (Beat Juggle)	Rihanna	"n/a"	n/a	FreeStyleGames	No	Dance Party Mix Pack	June 29, 2010

- ^a Song released for the Wii on March 25, 2010.
- ^b Song was free for a limited time.

== Unused Mixes ==
While the base game contained 93 mixes in total, there were 4 mixes that never made it into the game. These mixes either were at one point planned to be in the game or were confirmed to be part of the song list, but ended up being scrapped during development. These mixes included various songs from Nirvana, Ludacris, Red Hot Chili Peppers and so on.

Song title 1	Artist 1	Song title 2	Artist 2	Mix artist
"All Apologies"	Nirvana	"Give It to Me Baby"	Rick James	DJ Shadow
"Stand Up"	Ludacris	"Suck My Kiss"	Red Hot Chili Peppers	n/a
"Party Hard"	The Perceptionists	"Take it Back"	Skillz feat. The Roots	n/a
"Lost Your Mind"	Aceyalone	"Secrets"	Bobby Womack	n/a
