= The Prime Time of Your Life =

2006 song by Daft Punk

Single by Daft Punk

from the album Human After All
- Released: 17 June 2006
- Recorded: 2004
- Genre: Industrial rock; noise rock
- Length: 4:23
- Label: Virgin
- Songwriters: Thomas Bangalter; Guy-Manuel de Homem-Christo
- Producer: Daft Punk

Daft Punk singles chronology
"Human After All" (2005)	"The Prime Time of Your Life" (2006)	"Harder, Better, Faster, Stronger (Alive 2007)" (2007)

Music video
- "The Prime Time of Your Life" on YouTube

"The Prime Time of Your Life" (Note: The single EP uses a zero article form of the title on the front cover and track listing.) is a song by French electronic music duo Daft Punk from their third studio album, Human After All. It was released as the fourth and final single from the album on 17 June 2006 by record label Virgin. The song was released with a music video written and directed by Tony Gardner, with makeup effects by his company, Alterian, Inc.

== Composition ==
A noted characteristic of "The Prime Time of Your Life" is the incremental acceleration of tempo as the track ends. Heather Phares of AllMusic stated, "the schaffel beat [...] gradually overtakes the song, eventually speeding up and devouring it". An early review described the increasing speed effect as resembling Lil Louis, and that the ending sounds akin to a washing machine. The overall structure of "The Prime Time of Your Life" was described by Matthew Weiner of Stylus as being "less a song than [a] framework on which to load more vocoders and trend-jumping schaffel beats."

On Daft Punk's live album Alive 2007, "The Prime Time of Your Life" is mashed up with "The Brainwasher" from Human After All, as well as "Rollin' & Scratchin'" and "Alive" from Homework.

== Music video ==
The music video for the song was written and directed by Tony Gardner. The makeup effects work for the video was designed and created by Alterian, Inc. Gardner's then eleven-year-old daughter Brianna plays the main character, Melody, a young girl who is struggling with anorexia.

The video starts with a close-up of a swiveling skull moving its jaw, which zooms out to reveal it is a reflection in the eye of a young girl (Melody) watching television. Everyone on the television is shown as a living skeleton in different programs. Daft Punk makes a cameo appearance in the music video as silver and gold skeletons being interviewed on the news.

Melody walks over to her dresser and looks at several photographs. She sees her parents, who are also living skeletons, triggering flashbacks revealing a necklace of some importance. She then looks at a picture of herself, in which she appears overweight, playing jump rope with some skeletons. Melody goes into the bathroom, where she is seen in the mirror with a poster of a skeletal rendition of Britney Spears (the cover image of her greatest hits album) being seen in the reflection. Melody proceeds to take off the necklace and lays it on the sink, then opens a drawer where she grabs a razor blade. Melody cuts and tears off the skin from her upper body, exposing muscle and tissue (no blood appears). She stares at herself in the mirror and gets flashbacks of her life, then collapses. Melody's parents, who are not skeletons, find their daughter lying motionless on the bathroom floor.

The camera pans out to show the photos on the dresser again, but everyone appears normal. The picture of Melody playing jump rope is also different, and she is not overweight. The video ends with Melody on the television, as a skeleton, about to play jump rope with two other skeletons, before the television turns off.

The music video was included with the CD and DVD version of the album Musique Vol. 1 1993–2005.

== Track listings ==
CD Maxi-Single
No.	Title	Length
1.	"The Prime Time of Your Life"	4:23
2.	"The Prime Time of Your Life" (Para One Remix)	3:48
3.	"The Brainwasher" (Erol Alkan's Horrorhouse Dub)	6:01
4.	"Technologic" (Digitalism's RMX)	5:58
Total length:		20:10

12" Single
No.	Title	Length
1.	"The Prime Time of Your Life" (Para One Remix)	3:48
2.	"The Brainwasher" (Erol Alkan's Horrorhouse Dub)	6:01
Total length:		9:49
