= Musique Vol. 1 1993–2005 =

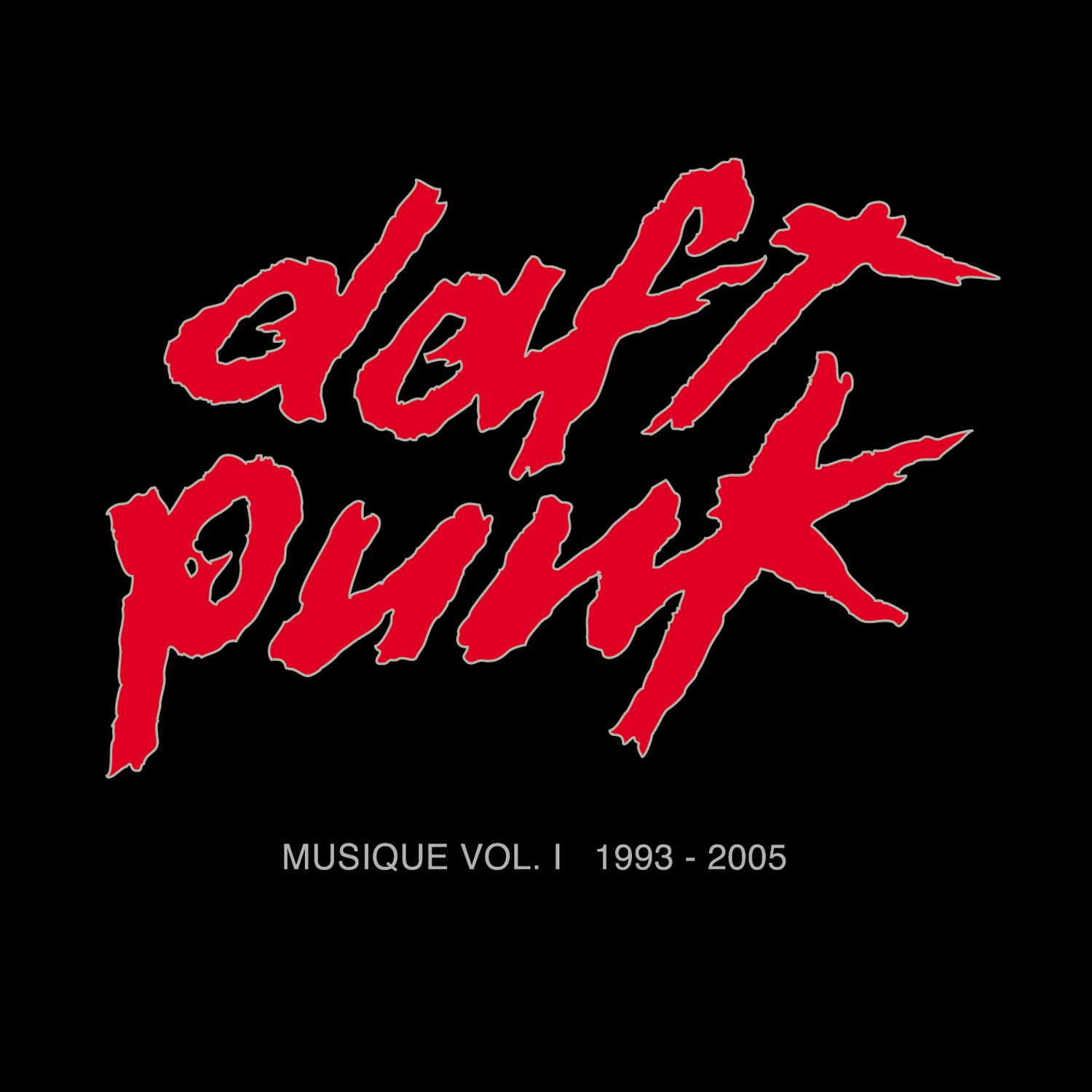

Compilation album by Daft Punk
- Released: 29 March 2006
- Recorded: 1993–2005
- Length: 75:42 (CD); 55:03 (DVD)
- Label: Virgin
- Producers: Thomas Bangalter; Guy-Manuel de Homem-Christo

Daft Punk chronology
| Human After All: Remixes (2006) | Musique Vol. 1 1993–2005 (2006) | Alive 2007 (2007) |

Professional ratings
Review scores
| Source | Rating |
|---|---|
| AllMusic | 4.5/5 stars |
| Drowned in Sound | 7/10 |
| Mojo | 4/5 stars |
| musicOMH | 3/5 stars |
| Pitchfork | 8.4/10 |
| Q | 3/5 stars |
| Uncut | 3/5 stars |

Musique Vol. 1 1993–2005 is a compilation album by the French electronic music duo Daft Punk released in Japan on 29 March 2006, in the United Kingdom on 3 April 2006, and in the United States on 4 April 2006.

== Background ==
The album's name comes from "Musique", a song that was initially released as the B-side to "Da Funk". A portion of "Musique" can be heard in the track "WDPK 83.7 FM" on their debut album Homework. The album contains five songs from Homework, three songs from Discovery, and three songs from Human After All. The anthology also includes three remixes. Their remixes of Ian Pooley's "Chord Memory" and Gabrielle's "Forget About the World" were recorded in 1996. The duo's remix of Scott Grooves' "Mothership Reconnection" was recorded in 1998.

A special edition includes a bonus DVD with 12 music videos—two of which are new, "The Prime Time of Your Life" and "Robot Rock (Daft Punk Maximum Overdrive)". Due to time constraints on the audio CD, some of the tracks are shorter edits. The song "Digital Love" appears only in the digital release and Japan edition. The DVD edition was rated 15 by the BBFC, due to the content of "The Prime Time of Your Life" music video.

== Track listing ==
Standard CD version
| No. | Title | Music | Original album | Length |
|---|---|---|---|---|
| 1. | "Musique" | | "Da Funk" single (1995) | 6:52 |
| 2. | "Da Funk" | | Homework (1997) | 5:28 |
| 3. | "Around the World" (radio edit) | | Homework | 4:01 |
| 4. | "Revolution 909" | | Homework | 5:35 |
| 5. | "Alive" | | Homework | 5:16 |
| 6. | "Rollin' & Scratchin'" | | Homework | 7:28 |
| 7. | "One More Time" (short radio edit) | | Discovery (2001) | 3:55 |
| 8. | "Harder, Better, Faster, Stronger" | | Discovery | 3:45 |
| 9. | "Something About Us" | | Discovery | 3:51 |
| 10. | "Robot Rock" | | Human After All (2005) | 4:47 |
| 11. | "Technologic" (radio edit) | | Human After All | 2:46 |
| 12. | "Human After All" | | Human After All | 5:20 |
| 13. | "Mothership Reconnection" (Daft Punk remix edit) | Scott Grooves | | 4:00 |
| 14. | "Chord Memory" (Daft Punk remix) | Ian Pooley | | 6:55 |
| 15. | "Forget About the World" (Daft Punk 'Don't Forget the World' mix) | Gabrielle | | 5:43 |
| Total length: | | | | 75:42 |

iTunes and Amazon releases
| No. | Title | Length |
|---|---|---|
| 15. | "Digital Love" | 5:01 |
| Total length: | | 75:00 |

Japan bonus track
| No. | Title | Length |
|---|---|---|
| 16. | "Digital Love" | 5:01 |
| Total length: | | 80:43 |

Bonus DVD
| No. | Title | Length |
|---|---|---|
| 1. | "Da Funk" | 5:34 |
| 2. | "Around the World" | 4:02 |
| 3. | "Burnin'" | 3:45 |
| 4. | "Revolution 909" | 3:54 |
| 5. | "One More Time" | 5:21 |
| 6. | "Harder, Better, Faster, Stronger" | 3:43 |
| 7. | "Something About Us" | 3:48 |
| 8. | "Robot Rock" | 3:17 |
| 9. | "Technologic" | 2:56 |
| 10. | "Rollin' and Scratchin'" (live in L.A.) | 8:38 |
| 11. | "The Prime Time of Your Life" | 4:05 |
| 12. | "Robot Rock" (Daft Punk Maximum Overdrive) | 6:00 |
| Total length: | | 55:03 |

Note: The DVD is not available on the current Parlophone/Warner Music (which is the current owner of Daft Punk's Virgin catalog after the breakup of EMI) re-release.

== Charts ==
Chart performance for Musique Vol. 1 1993–2005
| Chart (2006) | Peak position |
|---|---|
| Australian Albums (ARIA) | 47 |
| Belgian Albums (Ultratop Flanders) | 38 |
| Belgian Albums (Ultratop Wallonia) | 18 |
| French Albums (SNEP) | 6 |
| Irish Albums (IRMA) | 34 |
| Scottish Albums (Official Charts) | 31 |
| Swiss Albums (Schweizer Hitparade) | 36 |
| UK Albums Chart | 34 |
| UK Dance Albums (Official Charts) | 3 |
| US Top Dance Albums (Billboard) | 12 |
