= Alive 2007 =

Live album by Daft Punk
- Released: 19 November 2007
- Recorded: 14 June 2007
- Venues: Palais Omnisports de Paris-Bercy (Paris, France)
- Genre: French house
- Length: 84:00
- Label: Virgin
- Producers: Thomas Bangalter; Guy-Manuel de Homem-Christo

Daft Punk chronology
Musique Vol. 1 1993–2005 (2006)	Alive 2007 (2007)	Tron: Legacy (2010)

Singles from Alive 2007
- 1. "Harder, Better, Faster, Stronger (Alive 2007)" Released: 15 October 2007

Alive 2007 is the second live album by the French electronic music duo Daft Punk, released on 19 November 2007 by Virgin Records. It features Daft Punk's performance at the Palais Omnisports de Paris-Bercy arena in Paris on 14 June 2007 during their Alive tour. The set features an assortment of Daft Punk's music, incorporated with synthesisers, mixers and live effects.

The retail release of Alive 2007 in North America was delayed to 4 December 2007 due to production problems. It was released as a download on 20 November 2007, and was released in the United Kingdom on 25 February 2008. A performance of "Harder, Better, Faster, Stronger" was released as a single. The album won a Grammy Award for Best Electronic/Dance Album in 2009.

== Content and release ==
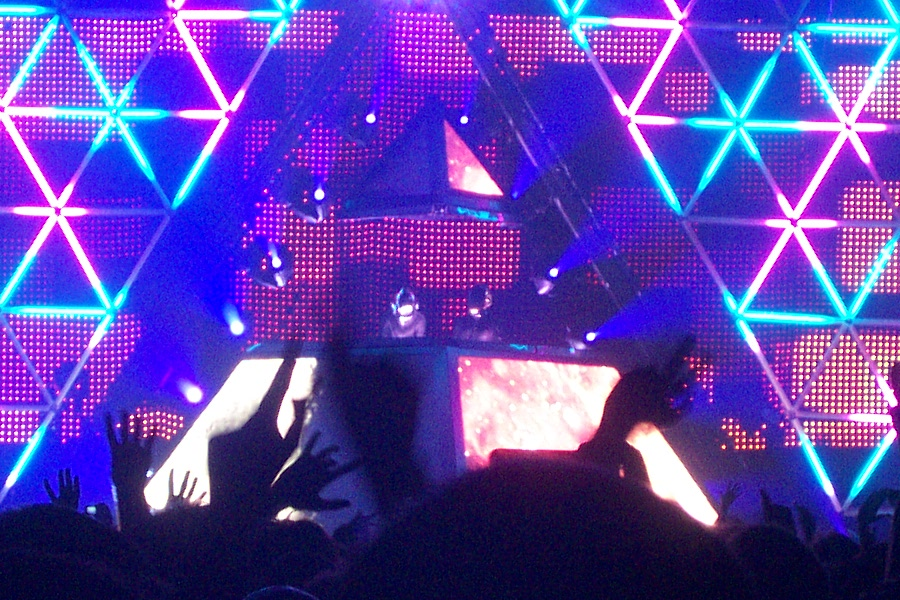
Daft Punk performing at Bercy during the Alive 2007 tour

Alive 2007 is taken from Daft Punk's performance at the Palais Omnisports de Paris-Bercy, Paris, on 14 June 2007. The performance includes remixed versions of many of their most popular tracks such as mixing vocal elements from "Too Long" with new music, and mixed elements of "Television Rules the Nation" with "Crescendolls", "Around the World" with "Harder, Better, Faster, Stronger" and "Superheroes" with "Human After All". The album includes elements of the Busta Rhymes song "Touch It", the original version of which was produced by Swizz Beatz featuring a sample of "Technologic". Also featured are elements of Gabrielle's "Forget About the World", the original version of which was remixed by Daft Punk for her single. The encore of the Alive 2007 set features Bangalter's side projects: Stardust's "Music Sounds Better with You" and Together's self-titled track "Together". The special edition of the album includes a 50-page book containing photographs from the tour taken by DJ Falcon, as well as the encore on a second disc.

In December 2014, two vinyl editions of the album were released. The first is standard black dual LP, while the second is a limited edition collectors box set. The box set edition was shipped along with a reissued Alive 1997 vinyl with stickers, dual vinyls in white in a threefold sleeve, and a separate white LP containing the encore. Also included is a large hardback 52-page photo book, an Alive 2007 concert pass replica, a Daft Punk printed slipmat, and a download code for the digital versions of the songs.

In the video game Fortnite, an excerpt of Alive 2007 was incorporated into an interactive experience that recreates the tour's stage show with additional visual elements. The experience launched on September 27, 2025 and was developed in collaboration with Cédric Hervet, creative director for Daft Punk.

== Tour ==
In early 2006, Daft Punk announced a number of shows. On 29 April, they performed at the Coachella Valley Music and Arts Festival in California, their first US performance since 1997. Thomas Bangalter initially suggested there would be a DVD release of the show, but later said he felt amateur footage shared online was more compelling. Daft Punk later announced shows at Bercy, Paris, Wireless Festival and RockNess in June 2007, the Oxegen festival in July and Lollapalooza in August.

Daft Punk played at the RockNess Festival by the banks of Loch Ness, Scotland, on 10 June 2007 as the headline act in the 10,000-capacity Clash tent. Part of the tent was removed to allow thousands of people outside to see the show. On 16 June, Daft Punk headlined the third day of the O2 Wireless Festival. Daft Punk headlined Stage 2/NME Stage at the Oxegen music festival on 8 July 2007. Their live set was preceded by a showing of the trailer for the film Daft Punk's Electroma. Four days later, the duo played at Traffic Torino Free Festival in Parco della Pellerina in Turin, Italy.

Daft Punk headlined the AT&T stage on 3 August 2007, the first night of the Lollapalooza music festival in Chicago. Their show there was praised by Pitchfork, which wrote that it "was a much-needed reminder of the still-potent power of communicative pop." On 5 August, Daft Punk performed at the International Centre in Toronto followed by a 9 August performance at KeySpan Park in Brooklyn, New York. They headlined the Vegoose festival in Las Vegas on 27 October, along with Rage Against the Machine, Muse and Queens of the Stone Age. At the end of October, Daft Punk performed in Mexico City. They also performed on Friday 2 November 2007 at the Arena Monterrey in Monterrey, Mexico and Guadalajara.

Modular Records announced that Daft Punk would appear in Australia for an event in December 2007 called Never Ever Land. Daft Punk were supported by their regular acts SebastiAn and Kavinsky at the appearances, which had been announced as an extension to the Alive 2007 tour. Never Ever Land toured to Melbourne at the Sidney Myer Music Bowl, Perth at the Esplanade, Brisbane at the Riverstage and finally Sydney at the Sydney Showground Main Arena. A Triple J interview with Pedro Winter (Busy P) revealed that Daft Punk's Sydney appearance on 22 December would be their final show for 2007 and the last to feature the pyramid light scheme. Tickets for the Australian tour sold more quickly than for any Daft Punk-related event in their history.

For the 2007 shows, Daft Punk added the tracks "Burnin'" and "Phoenix" and an encore. Bangalter explained that the 2006 sets were initially designed for performances within larger festivals, but later refined to accommodate Daft Punk-centric shows, saying "The goal was to try and bring a complete global experience to the audience." The introduction for the live show featured the five-note sequence used in Close Encounters of the Third Kind.

=== Technical elements ===
For the performances, Daft Punk used Ableton Live software on "custom-made supercomputers" controlled remotely with Behringer BCR2000 MIDI controllers. They also used Minimoog Voyager RME units, which, with the mixers, allowed them to "mix, shuffle, trigger loops, filter, distort samples, EQ in and out, transpose or destroy and deconstruct synth lines". The majority of the equipment was stored within offstage towers during the performances.

The tour visuals were set up by XL Video. The company provided eight-core Mac Pro units running Catalyst v4 and Final Cut Pro. Daft Punk approached the company with their visual concept for the shows. "They came to us with a pretty fixed idea of what they wanted", said head of XL Video, Richard Burford. "They wanted to mix live video with effects. Using the eight-core Mac Pros, we were able to take in eight digital sources and treat them as video streams. Then they could use Catalyst to coordinate the video with lighting effects and add their own effects in on the fly. The final digital video streams ran to LED screens."

=== Reception ===
The Alive 2007 tour was acclaimed. The Times described the set as a "memorable sensory spectacle, both dazzling and deafening" and ThisisLondon declared it "an almost faultless set of relentless electro euphoria". NME wrote that the performance was "a robotic spectacular", while Shoutmouth described the set as "typically triumphant". The tour is credited for bringing dance music to a wider audience, especially in North America. The Guardian journalist Gabriel Szatan likened it to the Beatles' 1964 performance on The Ed Sullivan Show, which brought British rock and roll to the American mainstream.

=== Dates ===
Date	City	Country	Venue
29 April 2006 (Note: The performance in Indio on 29 April 2006 was part of the Coachella Valley Music and Arts Festival.)	Indio	United States	Empire Polo Club
30 June 2006 (Note: The performance in Belfort on 30 June 2006 was part of Les Eurockéennes de Belfort Festival.)	Belfort	France	Lac de Malsaucy
14 July 2006 (Note: The performances in Barcelona on 14 July 2006 and in Madrid on 15 July 2006 were part of the Summercase Festival.)	Barcelona	Spain	Parc del Fòrum
15 July 2006	Madrid	Spain	Boadilla del Monte
26 July 2006 (Note: The performance in Stratford-upon-Avon on 26 July 2006 was part of the Global Gathering Festival.)	Stratford-upon-Avon	United Kingdom	Long Marston Airfield
5 August 2006 (Note: The performance in Zambujeira do Mar on 5 August 2006 was part of the Festival Sudoeste.)	Zambujeira do Mar	Portugal	Herdade da Casa Branca
12 August 2006 (Note: The performances in Chiba on 12 August 2006 and in Osaka on 13 August 2006 were part of the Summer Sonic Festival.)	Chiba	Japan	Makuhari Messe
13 August 2006	Osaka	Japan	WTC Open Air Stadium
19 August 2006 (Note: The performance in Hasselt on 19 August 2006 was part of the Pukkelpop Festival.)	Hasselt	Belgium	Domein Kiewit
28 August 2006	Dublin	Ireland	Marlay Park
9 September 2006 (Note: The performance in Warsaw on 9 September 2006 was part of the Summer of Music Festival.)	Warsaw	Poland	Służewiec Racetrack
27 October 2006 (Note: The performances in Rio de Janeiro on 27 October 2006 and in São Paulo on 29 October 2006 were part of the TIM Festival.)	Rio de Janeiro	Brazil	Marina da Glória
29 October 2006	São Paulo	Brazil	Tom Brasil
2 November 2006 (Note: The performance in Santiago on 2 November 2006 was part of the Santiago Urbano Electrónico Festival.)	Santiago	Chile	Espacio Riesco
4 November 2006 (Note: The performance in Buenos Aires on 4 November 2006 was part of the BUE Festival.)	Buenos Aires	Argentina	Club Ciudad de Buenos Aires
11 November 2006 (Note: The performance in Miami on 11 November 2006 was part of the Bang! Music Festival.)	Miami	United States	Bicentennial Park
10 June 2007 (Note: The performance in Inverness on 10 June 2007 was part of the RockNess Festival.)	Inverness	Scotland	Clunes Farm
14 June 2007	Paris	France	Palais Omnisports Bercy
16 June 2007 (Note: The performances in London on 16 June 2007 and in Leeds on 17 June 2007 were part of the Wireless Festival.)	London	England	Hyde Park
17 June 2007	Leeds	England	Harewood House
23 June 2007	Istanbul	Turkey	Turkcell Kuruçeşme Arena
26 June 2007	Nîmes	France	Arena of Nîmes
29 June 2007	Düsseldorf	Germany	Philips Halle
30 June 2007	Berlin	Germany	Velodrom
4 July 2007	Amsterdam	Netherlands	Heineken Music Hall
6 July 2007	Esch-sur-Alzette	Luxembourg	Rockhal
8 July 2007 (Note: The performance in Naas on 8 July 2007 was part of the Oxegen Festival.)	Naas	Ireland	Punchestown Racecourse
12 July 2007 (Note: The performance in Turin on 12 July 2007 was part of the Traffic Free Festival.)	Turin	Italy	Parco della Pellerina
21 July 2007	Los Angeles	United States	Los Angeles Memorial Sports Arena
27 July 2007	Berkeley	United States	Hearst Greek Theatre
29 July 2007	Seattle	United States	WaMu Theater
31 July 2007	Morrison	United States	Red Rocks Amphitheatre
3 August 2007 (Note: The performance in Chicago on 3 August 2007 was part of the Lollapalooza Festival.)	Chicago	United States	Grant Park
5 August 2007	Mississauga	Canada	Arrow Hall
7 August 2007	Montreal	Canada	Bell Centre
9 August 2007	New York City	United States	KeySpan Park
27 October 2007 (Note: The performance in Las Vegas on 27 October 2007 was part of the Vegoose Festival.)	Las Vegas	United States	Sam Boyd Stadium
31 October 2007	Mexico City	Mexico	Palacio de los Deportes
2 November 2007	Monterrey	Mexico	Monterrey Arena
4 November 2007	Zapopan	Mexico	Telmex Auditorium
6 December 2007	Kobe	Japan	World Memorial Hall
8 December 2007	Chiba	Japan	Makuhari Messe
9 December 2007	Chiba	Japan	Makuhari Messe
13 December 2007	Melbourne	Australia	Sidney Myer Music Bowl
14 December 2007	Melbourne	Australia	Sidney Myer Music Bowl
16 December 2007	Perth	Australia	The Esplanade
20 December 2007	Brisbane	Australia	Riverstage
22 December 2007	Sydney	Australia	Showground Main Arena

== Critical reception ==
Professional ratings
Aggregate scores
Source	Rating
Metacritic	78/100
Review scores
Source	Rating
AllMusic	4/5 stars
The A.V. Club	B+
The Boston Phoenix	3.5/4 stars
Entertainment Weekly	A−
The Guardian	3/5 stars
MSN Music (Consumer Guide)	A−
NME	7/10
Pitchfork	8.5/10
Rolling Stone	3.5/5 stars
Spin	4/5 stars

On the review aggregator Metacritic, Alive 2007 has a score of 78 out of 100, indicating "generally favourable reviews". Pitchfork regarded it as "the Ultimate Daft Punk Mixtape", finding that songs from Human After All had been "constantly improved and born anew" for the live set. The sentiment was also shared by AllMusic, stating that "It has the feel of a greatest-hits-live concert, but energized by Daft Punk's talents at weaving songs in and out of each other." AllMusic considered it weaker than Alive 1997. A review by The Star noted that the release and Daft Punk's concurrent tours restored the duo's reputation following the mixed reception for Human After All. Critics also reconsidered songs from Human After All after they were integrated into the tour.

Dave de Sylvia of Sputnikmusic gave Alive 2007 a score of four stars out of five and said, "Despite a few individual disappointments, Alive 2007 is as exciting a collection of music as any released this year." Entertainment Weekly felt that the live crowd enhanced the positive mood of the performance. Rolling Stone stated that Alive 2007 "loses some of the essential experience" of attending the live Daft Punk events. The Boston Phoenix also felt that the album package would have benefited from more video content, expressing that a key factor of the live show was its implementation of visual elements. In his first positive review for a Daft Punk album, Robert Christgau wrote that a full video representation was avoided because "too much scale, flesh and bodily effluvia would be lost". Thomas Bangalter expressed his reasons of not releasing a DVD by stating "the thousands of clips on the internet are better to us than any DVD that could have been released."

At the 51st Grammy Awards, Alive 2007 won the Grammy Award for Best Electronic/Dance Album, and the single "Harder, Better, Faster, Stronger" won for Best Dance Recording.

In 2025, Resident Advisor ranked Alive 2007 third in their list of "The Best Electronic Mixes of 2000–25"; contributor Hattie Lindert wrote how Daft Punk "injected new blood into their life's work, all but creating the blueprint for modern American EDM in the process", further describing the album as "blood-pumping, head-thrashing, live-(ish) electronic music that's the paragon of 'FOMO.'"

== Track listing ==
All tracks are written by Thomas Bangalter and Guy-Manuel de Homem-Christo, except where noted.

No.	Title	Writer(s)	Length
1.	"Robot Rock / Oh Yeah"	Bangalter, de Homem-Christo, Kae Williams	6:27
2.	"Touch It / Technologic"	Bangalter, de Homem-Christo, Trevor Smith, Swizz Beatz	5:29
3.	"Television Rules the Nation / Crescendolls"	Bangalter, de Homem-Christo, Dwight Brewster, Aleta Jennings	4:50
4.	"Too Long / Steam Machine"	Bangalter, de Homem-Christo, Anthony Moore	7:01
5.	"Around the World / Harder, Better, Faster, Stronger"	Bangalter, de Homem-Christo, Edwin Birdsong	5:42
6.	"Burnin' / Too Long"	Bangalter, de Homem-Christo, Anthony Moore	7:11
7.	"Face to Face / Short Circuit"	Bangalter, de Homem-Christo, Todd Imperatrice	4:55
8.	"One More Time / Aerodynamic"	Bangalter, de Homem-Christo, Anthony Moore	6:10
9.	"Aerodynamic Beats / Forget About the World"	Bangalter, de Homem-Christo, Gabrielle, Ben Barson, Andy Dean, Ben Wolff	3:31
10.	"Prime Time of Your Life / Brainwasher / Rollin' & Scratchin' / Alive"		10:22
11.	"Da Funk / Daftendirekt"		6:36
12.	"Superheroes / Human After All / Rock'n Roll"	Bangalter, de Homem-Christo, Barry Manilow, Marty Panzer	5:41
13.	"Human After All / Together / One More Time / Music Sounds Better with You"	Bangalter, Stephane Quême, Keith Nash, Anthony Moore, Benjamin "Diamond" Cohen, Alain Quême, Frank Musker, Dominic King	9:59
Total length:			83:54

Note: The physical standard edition of the album omits track 13.

== Chart positions ==
=== Weekly charts ===
Chart (2007–08)	Peak position
Australian Albums (ARIA)	14
Belgian Albums (Ultratop Flanders)	6
Belgian Albums (Ultratop Wallonia)	6
Dutch Albums (Album Top 100)	47
French Albums (SNEP)	2
Irish Albums (IRMA)	34
Italian Albums (FIMI)	98
Mexican Albums (Top 100 Mexico)	25
Swiss Albums (Schweizer Hitparade)	17
UK Albums (Official Charts)	86
US Billboard 200	169
US Top Dance Albums (Billboard)	1

=== Year-end charts ===
Chart (2007)	Position
French Albums (SNEP)	36

Chart (2008)	Position
Australian Albums (ARIA)	86
French Albums (SNEP)	82
US Top Dance/Electronic Albums (Billboard)	12

== Certifications ==
Region	Certification	Certified units/sales
Australia (ARIA)	Gold	35,000^{^}
Belgium (BRMA)	Platinum	30,000^{*}
France (SNEP)	2× Platinum	200,000^{*}
New Zealand (RMNZ)	Gold	7,500^{‡}
United Kingdom (BPI)	Silver	60,000^{*}
^{*} Sales figures based on certification alone.^{^} Shipments figures based on certification alone.^{‡} Sales+streaming figures based on certification alone.
