= Robot Rock (song) =

2005 song by Daft Punk

Single by Daft Punk

from the album Human After All
- Released: 11 April 2005
- Recorded: 2004
- Genre: Electronic rock; dance-rock
- Length: 4:47
- Label: Virgin; Astralwerks
- Songwriters: Thomas Bangalter; Guy-Manuel de Homem-Christo; Kae Williams Jr.
- Producer: Daft Punk

Daft Punk singles chronology
| "Something About Us" (2003) | "Robot Rock" (2005) | "Technologic" (2005) |

Music videos
- "Robot Rock" on YouTube; "Robot Rock" (Maximum Overdrive Mix) on YouTube

"Robot Rock" is a song by the French electronic music duo Daft Punk, released on 11 April 2005 as the lead single from their third studio album, Human After All. The song was initially released with a music video, directed by and featuring the duo, preceding the single's release. While the single reached a moderately high chart position, critics found the song overly repetitive compared with songs on their other studio albums at the time. It features a sample of "Release the Beast" performed by Breakwater.

== Composition ==
"Robot Rock" has been described as electronic rock and dance-rock. It contains a sample of the Breakwater song "Release the Beast". The sample features a synthesizer riff with an oscillator sync timbre, as well as percussion and power chords on an electric guitar. Daft Punk incorporated a vocoder into the production, repeating the title phrase of "Robot Rock". Thomas Bangalter noted that the duo used a Moog synthesizer with guitar pedals for the song.

The Breakwater sample is credited on the single's sleeve and on the liner notes of the parent Human After All album. Bangalter explained that on his Roulé label, "we've been doing records that are 9 minutes with only [a single] one second loop, with even less foundation than there is on 'Robot Rock'. It's always been a way to reinterpret things—sometimes it's using [an] element from the past, or sometimes recreating them and fooling the eyes or the ears, which is just a fun thing to do." He elaborated that the song "is a tribute to the power of heavy rock chords. In a way I think we were exploring if you can take the essence of rock—that power—and mix it with dance. But to take a riff and loop it is to explore the core of rock."

The Breakwater synthesizer riff is absent from the "Maximum Overdrive" remix of "Robot Rock", which consists solely of the song's other elements for nearly six minutes. A music video for this remix was shot and included on the Daft Punk Musique Vol. 1 1993–2005 compilation CD and DVD.

== Music video ==
The music video for "Robot Rock" consists of Thomas Bangalter and Guy-Manuel de Homem-Christo of Daft Punk performing the song on a stage decorated with several televisions and lights. It was filmed on VHS to achieve an aged look. This is the first video to feature the duo exclusively as themselves. This pattern continues for the rest of the Human After All videos except for "The Prime Time of Your Life", where they only make a cameo appearance. Bangalter plays the Gibson EDS-1275 double neck guitar shown on the "Robot Rock" single cover while de Homem-Christo performs on a drum set.

== Critical reception ==
Though it reached moderate positions in UK and U.S. dance charts, the single encountered criticism for its general structure. A review in Stylus Magazine expressed that the track "does nothing, means nothing and goes nowhere for an unconscionably long time." References to earlier Daft Punk singles were also mentioned, as Rolling Stone declared "nothing builds to achieve the prior glories of 'Da Funk' or 'One More Time'" and Pitchfork Media noted that the single "is a poor man's 'Aerodynamic'." A Sputnikmusic review noted that "although annoying in nature, [it] is also very rewarding to listen to."

== Track listings ==
CD promotional single
| No. | Title | Length |
|---|---|---|
| 1. | "Robot Rock" | 4:49 |
| 2. | "Robot Rock" (Edit) | 3:04 |
| Total length: | | 7:53 |

CD single
| No. | Title | Length |
|---|---|---|
| 1. | "Robot Rock" (Radio Edit) | 3:06 |
| 2. | "Robot Rock" (Soulwax remix) | 6:30 |
| 3. | "Robot Rock" (Maximum Overdrive (Note: "Robot Rock (Maximum Overdrive)" was later titled "Robot Rock (Daft Punk Maximum Overdrive Mix)" in the album Human After All: Remixes.)) | 5:56 |
| 4. | "Robot Rock" | 4:48 |
| Total length: | | 20:20 |

12-inch maxi single
| No. | Title | Length |
|---|---|---|
| 1. | "Robot Rock" | 4:47 |
| 2. | "Robot Rock" (Maximum Overdrive) | 12:04 |
| 3. | "Robot Rock" (Soulwax Remix) | 6:30 |
| 4. | "Rockapella" | 1:11 |
| Total length: | | 24:32 |

== Personnel ==
- Daft Punk – vocals, electric guitar, drum machine, synthesizer, bass guitar, vocoder, Moog synthesizer, guitar pedals, programming, production

== Charts ==
Weekly chart performance for "Robot Rock"
| Chart (2005) | Peak position |
|---|---|
| Belgium (Ultratip Bubbling Under Flanders) | 12 |
| Belgium Dance (Ultratop Flanders) | 21 |
| Belgium (Ultratip Bubbling Under Wallonia) | 6 |
| Belgium Dance (Ultratop Wallonia) | 21 |
| Finland (Suomen virallinen lista) | 12 |
| France (SNEP) | 79 |
| Germany (GfK) | 100 |
| Greece (IFPI) | 26 |
| Hungary (Dance Top 40) | 38 |
| Ireland (IRMA) | 33 |
| Ireland Dance (IRMA) | 2 |
| Italy (FIMI) | 32 |
| Scottish Singles Sales (Official Charts) | 33 |
| Spain (Promusicae) | 17 |
| UK Singles (Official Charts) | 32 |
| UK Dance (Official Charts) | 1 |
| US Dance Club Songs (Billboard) | 15 |
