= I:Cube =

French DJ

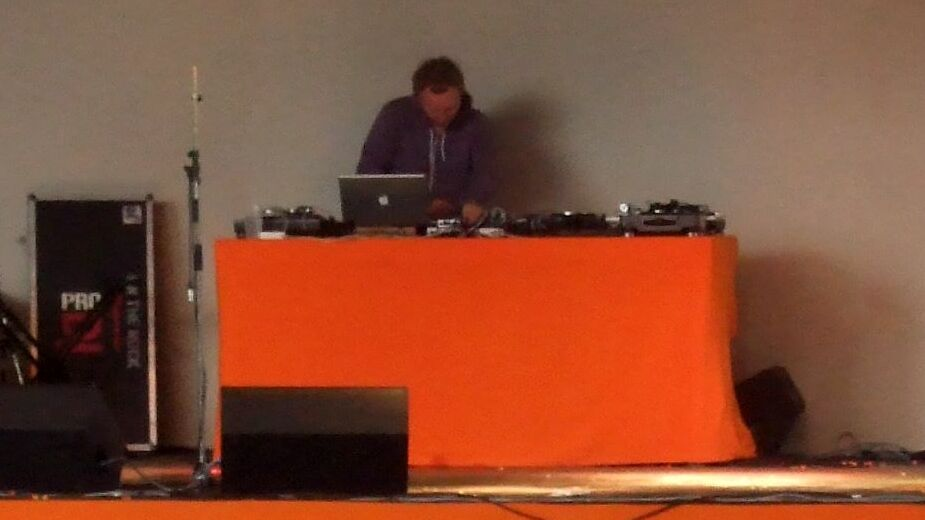
- I:Cube in 2007

Background information
- Also known as: DJ Ringardos, Faceball 2000, Icola, The Eye Cube
- Born: Nicolas Chaix
- Origin: France
- Genres: Techno, Downtempo, ambient, trip hop, lounge
- Occupations: Producer, musician
- Years active: 1996–present
- Labels: Versatile

Nicolas Chaix, also known by his alias I:Cube, is a French DJ and an electronic music producer.

== Background ==
Paris based, he first gained limelight on Paris' underground dance scene in the mid to late 1990s, most notably through his remix of "Around The World" by Daft Punk in 1997. Daft Punk had remixed one of his titles, "Disco Cubizm", in 1996.

== Career ==
In 1997, I:Cube released his first album, Picnic Attack.

In 1999, the Basic Bastard album was released. It was reviewed in the 31 January 2000 issue of the CMJ New Music Report. The reviewer called it "a soulful and eclectic venture that infuses the subtleties of dub with the funk of electro", and that it embraced the elements of house, techno and trip-hop. The recommended tracks were, "Adore" "Gastro Funk" and "The Basic Bastard". The track, "The Basic Bastard" samples "Hold on to Love", a 1978 song by Saint Tropez.

His music appears on many compilation albums such as the Hotel Costes series.

== Château Flight ==
In 1996, DJ Gilb'R, who then a programmer at Radio Nova, received a demo cassette from I:Cube. Gilb'R was impressed, so he made him the first artist of his newly created label, Versatile. By 1997, Versatile had released several of I:Cube's records. Chaix and Cohen eventually began to collaborate as Château Flight (French: Château Flight, lit. 'Castle Flight'). Their first album, Puzzle was released by Versatile on October 30, 2001.

== Discography ==
=== As I:Cube ===
- 1997 - Picnic Attack
- 1999 - Adore
- 2003 - 3
- 2006 - Live At The Planetarium
- 2012 - "M" Mega mix
- 2018 - Double Pack
- 2023 - Eye Cube

=== With Château Flight ===
==== Albums ====
- 2000 - Puzzle
- 2002 - Crash Test (with La Caution)
- 2004 - Remix
- 2006 - Les Vampires (Original Soundtrack)
