= Human After All =

2005 studio album by Daft Punk

Studio album by Daft Punk
- Released: 14 March 2005
- Recorded: 13 September – 9 November 2004
- Studio: Daft House (Paris)
- Genre: Dance-rock
- Length: 45:38
- Label: Virgin
- Producers: Thomas Bangalter; Guy-Manuel de Homem-Christo

Daft Punk chronology
Daft Club (2003)	Human After All (2005)	Human After All: Remixes (2006)

Singles from Human After All
- 1. "Robot Rock" Released: 11 April 2005; 2. "Technologic" Released: 14 June 2005; 3. "Human After All" Released: 21 October 2005; 4. "The Prime Time of Your Life" Released: 17 June 2006

Human After All is the third studio album by the French electronic music duo Daft Punk, released on 14 March 2005 through Virgin Records. Whereas their previous studio album, Discovery (2001), was inspired by disco and garage house and produced over two years, Human After All was more minimalistic and improvisational with heavier guitars and electronics, and was produced in six weeks.

Human After All received mixed reviews from critics, who disliked its minimalistic, repetitive nature and considered the record inferior to Daft Punk's previous works. However, some praised the darker experimental tone, distinct from Daft Punk's other records.

Some singles, in particular "Robot Rock" and "Technologic", charted in several countries, while "Human After All" charted in France. Human After All reached number one on the Billboard Dance/Electronic Albums chart, and was nominated for the 2006 Grammy Award for Best Electronic/Dance Album. A Human After All remix album was released in 2006.

Daft Punk incorporated the songs from Human After All into their Alive 2006/2007 tour, which received huge acclaim. The success of the tour caused many fans and critics to reassess the original album in retrospect, saying that they had misjudged Daft Punk, and gave Human After All widespread retrospective acclaim.

== Recording ==
For Human After All, Daft Punk wanted to "do the opposite" of their previous album, Discovery (2001). During the promotion of Discovery, the Daft Punk member Thomas Bangalter mentioned that "maybe our next LP might be very hard -- as long as there is the surprise". Human After All was produced in six weeks from September to November 2004, with less than two of those weeks spent recording. Whereas Discovery contains many samples, Human After All only uses one. Bangalter compared the deliberately unpolished quality to "a stone that's unworked". It was created primarily with two guitars, two drum machines, a vocoder and an eight-track machine. They used an inexpensive DigiTech synth wah-wah pedal extensively throughout the record.

Bangalter said Human After All was about fear and paranoia, and was not intended to "make you feel good". He also stated that it and the 2006 film Daft Punk's Electroma were "extremely tormented and sad and terrifying looks at technology, but there can be some beauty and emoting from it". He acknowledged the perceived mechanical quality of the record, but felt that it expressed "the dance between humanity and technology".

At the time of Human After All's release, Daft Punk considered it their favourite album, and described it as "pure improvisation". Guy-Manuel de Homem-Christo said that every album they made was "tightly linked with our lives" and that "the internal, personal stuff Thomas went through during Human After All made it closer to where he was at the time".

== Composition ==
Whereas Discovery uses conventional pop song structures, Human After All uses repetitive loops. A press release said Human After All was "more spontaneous and direct" than Daft Punk's previous albums. Stereogum described the first track, "Human After All", as "deceptively cheerful-sounding", with "back-and-forth" staccato guitar. "The Prime Time of Your Life" pairs a "gnarled, percussive low-end melody" with processed vocals. "Robot Rock" uses a sample of the main melody of the 1980 Breakwater song "Release the Beast", with "amped-up" funk riffs. "Steam Machine" and "The Brainwasher" are "crunchy, biting" industrial tracks and "Make Love" is "mellow" neo soul. Following the brief "channel-surfing" interlude of "On/Off", "Television Rules the Nation" is said to have a "Black Sabbath crunch". "Technologic" is a "guitar-heavy" track, with a monotonous pitch-shifted voice intoning instructions such as "buy it, use it, break it, fix it, trash it, change it, mail, upgrade it". For the final song "Emotion", it was observed that despite the title word repeating throughout its duration, the singing voice itself lacks emotive expression.

== Release and promotion ==
Leading up to the release of Human After All, promotional CDs of the album were distributed with tamper-evident seals, as well as individual watermarks to identify each recipient. Retail copies on CD also implemented Copy Control protection against unauthorized duplication. Nevertheless, the album leaked online several months before release. Fans confused by its radically different style initially speculated that it was a fake designed to foil online filesharing.

In 2013, Spin wrote that the official release of the album had been ill-timed, as it occurred after the end of the "major-label electronica movement" of the 1990s, but before the rise of independent dance labels such as DFA Records and Ed Banger. Daft Punk gave no interviews to promote the album, as they felt this would run contrary to the album's theme of the media as an oppressive force. The only official statement given by Daft Punk at the time was: "We believe that Human After All speaks for itself". Homem-Christo later said that choosing to be silent was the biggest mistake they had ever made.

Bangalter emphasized that their only promotion for the album would be through its music videos. To that end, Daft Punk directed the videos for "Robot Rock" and "Technologic", having previously directed the video for their song "Fresh". Tony Gardner directed the video for "The Prime Time of Your Life", though Bangalter predicted that it would be impractical for promotional use due to its graphic content. In 2025, a music video for the song "Television Rules the Nation" filmed during the album's promotion was released on Daft Punk's official YouTube channel, after the video allegedly leaked in poor quality in the 2000s.

Daft Punk intended to make a video for the song "Human After All", but the footage they shot for it was expanded to create the 2006 film Daft Punk's Electroma instead. The official video for the song would be released in 2026 on the fifth anniversary of the duo's split, featuring footage from Electroma edited by Daft Punk's creative director Cédric Hervet. Songs from Human After All also appear in the Daft Punk compilation Musique Vol. 1 1993–2005 and the live album Alive 2007.

The cover image of Human After All features the Daft Punk logo displayed on a television screen. Each single from the album features a cover with a different image on a similar screen. Bangalter cited the novel Nineteen Eighty-Four by George Orwell as an inspiration for the record.

== Reception ==
=== Critical ===
Professional ratings
Aggregate scores
Source	Rating
Metacritic	57/100
Review scores
Source	Rating
AllMusic	3/5 stars
Blender	2.5/5 stars
Entertainment Weekly	C
The Guardian	2/5 stars
Mojo	4/5 stars
NME	7/10
Pitchfork	4.9/10
Q	2/5 stars
Rolling Stone	2.5/5 stars
Spin	C−

At Metacritic, which assigns a normalized rating out of 100 to reviews from mainstream critics, Human After All received an average score of 57, indicating "mixed or average reviews", based on 28 reviews. In his review for Blender magazine, Simon Reynolds said that Discovery's blissful and "open-hearted" music had been replaced by "an archly ironic dance-rock that feels desultory and numb – verging on autistic". Q felt that it lacked the "fun" of Daft Punk's previous work. Barry Walters of Rolling Stone said that the duo generally "repeats rather than elaborates its riffs", and that they "exaggerate their band's own robotic tendencies here, much to the detriment of its grooves". Dorian Lynskey of The Guardian called the album "a joyless collection of average ideas stretched desperately thin". Robert Christgau from The Village Voice graded the album a "dud", indicating "a bad record whose details rarely merit further thought". Mixmag wrote that Human After All sounded "as if Bangalter took a holiday and let his four year-old son ... loose in the studio with a toy sound machine".

In a positive review, Matthew Weiner of Stylus Magazine wrote: "It's the same story, track after track, willfully mistaking alternation for variation, intensification for development and dynamics. In other words, a shining example of pop songcraft in the 21st century." Mojo magazine said that it "strips out the most flamboyant frills to create a more incisive sound". Human After All was nominated for the 2006 Grammy Award for Best Electronic/Dance Album, but lost to the Chemical Brothers album Push the Button.

=== Commercial ===
The album topped the Billboard Top Dance/Electronic Albums chart and peaked at number 98 on the Billboard 200. It reached number three in France and received a double gold certification from the Syndicat National de l'Édition Phonographique (SNEP) one month after its release. It also received a silver certification from the British Phonographic Industry (BPI) in the United Kingdom, where it peaked at number 10. As of May 2013, the album has sold 127,000 copies in the US and 80,838 copies in the UK. The first single from the album, "Robot Rock", received moderate attention, reaching number 32 in the UK and number 15 on the Billboard Hot Dance Club Songs chart, but was not a major hit. The second single, "Technologic", reached number 40 in the UK but did considerably better in airplay and was featured in an iPod commercial. "Human After All" reached number 93 in France.

== Legacy ==
Many reassessed Human After All after Daft Punk's Alive 2006/2007 tour. Pedro Winter, Daft Punk's manager at the time, said: "Everyone shut their mouths... People even apologized, like, 'How could we have misjudged Daft Punk?' The live show changed everything. Even if I'm part of it, I like to step back and admire it. Me, I cried." Bangalter said: "Human After All was the music we wanted to make at the time we did it. We have always strongly felt there was a logical connection between our three albums, and it's great to see that people seem to realize that when they listen now to the live show."

Elements from Human After All would later appear in records from other artists. Daft Punk produced the Teriyaki Boyz song "HeartBreaker", which features elements of the song "Human After All". "Technologic" was sampled in the Busta Rhymes single "Touch It", produced by Swizz Beatz. Subsequently, elements of both "Technologic" and "Touch It" were featured in Daft Punk's live album Alive 2007. A portion of the vocals were also altered for the Hannah Wants single "Rhymes", which reached number 13 on the UK Singles Chart in 2015. "Technologic" was later interpolated in the 2024 single "Guess" by Charli XCX.

== Track listing ==
All tracks are written by Thomas Bangalter and Guy-Manuel de Homem-Christo, except for "Robot Rock", additionally written by Kae Williams Jr., Gene Robinson, and Vince Garnell.

No.	Title	Length
1.	"Human After All"	5:20
2.	"The Prime Time of Your Life"	4:23
3.	"Robot Rock"	4:48
4.	"Steam Machine"	5:21
5.	"Make Love"	4:50
6.	"The Brainwasher"	4:08
7.	"On/Off"	0:19
8.	"Television Rules the Nation"	4:48
9.	"Technologic"	4:44
10.	"Emotion"	6:57
Total length:		45:38

=== Notes ===
- "Robot Rock" contains a sample of "Release the Beast", written by Kae Williams Jr., Gene Robinson, and Vince Garnell, and performed by Breakwater.

== Personnel ==
Adapted from the Human After All liner notes.

- Daft Punk – vocals, guitars, drum machines, synthesizers, piano, bass guitar, vocoder, programming, production
- Cédric Hervet – production coordination
- Gildas Loaëc – production coordination
- Nilesh Patel – mastering

== Remix album ==
Human After All: Remixes

Remix album by Daft Punk
- Released: 29 March 2006
- Length: 56:42 (original); 84:34 (re-releases)
- Labels: Toshiba EMI (original); Warner Music France (re-releases)
- Producer: Various

Daft Punk chronology
Human After All (2005)	Human After All: Remixes (2006)	Musique Vol. 1 1993–2005 (2006)

Human After All: Remixes, comprising remixes by musicians such as Soulwax and Justice, was released on 29 March 2006 exclusively in Japan. On 17 June 2014, it was reissued in Japan with four additional bonus tracks. On 9 August, it was released digitally internationally for the first time, with an additional remix of "Technologic" by Le Knight Club. A vinyl pressing was released on November 28, 2025 to coincide with the album's 20th anniversary.

=== Track listing ===
Human After All: Remixes (original release)
No.	Title	Length
1.	"Robot Rock" (Soulwax remix)	6:31
2.	"Human After All" (SebastiAn remix)	4:47
3.	"Technologic" (Peaches No Logic remix)	4:37
4.	"The Brainwasher" (Erol Alkan’s Horrorhouse dub)	6:05
5.	"The Prime Time of Your Life" (Para One remix)	3:51
6.	"Human After All" ("Guy-Man After All" Justice remix)	4:00
7.	"Technologic" (Digitalism’s Highway to Paris remix)	6:00
8.	"Human After All" (Alter Ego remix)	9:25
9.	"Technologic" (Vitalic remix)	5:26
10.	"Robot Rock" (Daft Punk Maximum Overdrive mix)	5:57
Total length:		56:42

== Charts ==
=== Weekly charts ===
Chart (2005)	Peak position
Australian Albums (ARIA)	36
Austrian Albums (Ö3 Austria)	23
Belgian Albums (Ultratop Flanders)	8
Belgian Albums (Ultratop Wallonia)	11
Canadian Albums (Nielsen BDS)	38
Dutch Albums (Album Top 100)	40
French Albums (SNEP)	3
German Albums (Offizielle Top 100)	38
Greek Albums (IFPI)	6
Irish Albums (IRMA)	10
Italian Albums (FIMI)	19
Norwegian Albums (VG-lista)	36
Spanish Albums (Promusicae)	87
Swedish Albums (Sverigetopplistan)	30
Swiss Albums (Schweizer Hitparade)	8
UK Albums (Official Charts)	10
US Billboard 200	98
US Top Dance Albums (Billboard)	1

Chart (2021)	Peak position
Croatian International Albums (HDU)	12

=== Year-end charts ===
Chart (2005)	Position
French Albums (SNEP)	92
US Electronic Albums (Billboard)	16

== Certifications ==
Region	Certification	Certified units/sales
France (SNEP)	2× Gold	200,000^{*}
United Kingdom (BPI)	Gold	100,000^{‡}
^{*} Sales figures based on certification alone.^{‡} Sales+streaming figures based on certification alone.
