= Alter Ego (band) =

German house music duo

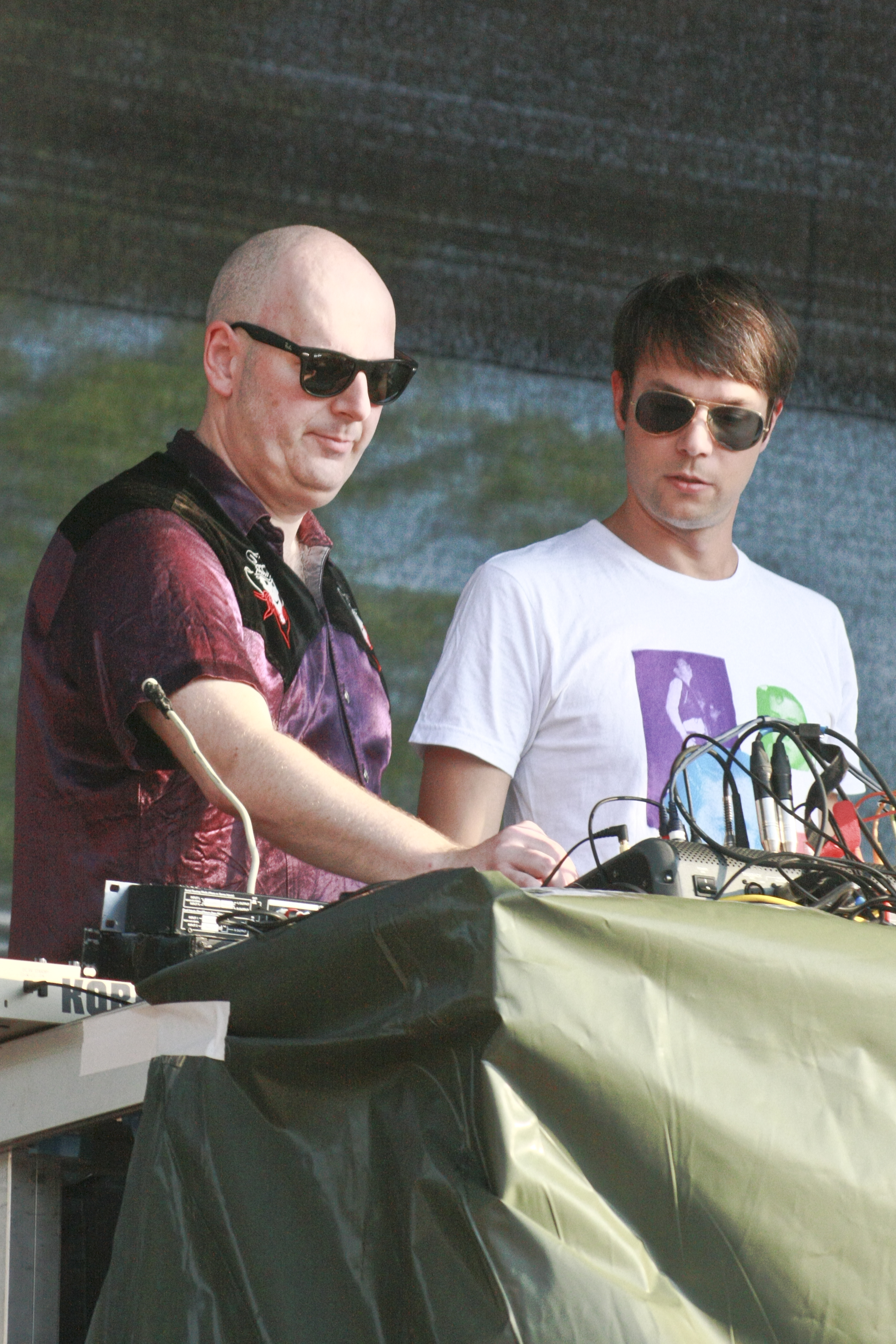
- Alter Ego in 2009

Background information
- Origin: Germany
- Genres: Acid house
- Years active: 1992–2008 (indefinite hiatus)
- Members: Roman Flügel; Jörn Elling Wuttke
- Website: www.ongaku.de

Alter Ego is a German music group comprising Roman Flügel and Jörn Elling Wuttke. They achieved notability in 2004 with their track "Rocker", which became one of the year's defining dance anthems, especially in Europe, and getting played on rotation amongst the most popular DJs such as Felix Da Housecat, 2 Many DJs and The Chemical Brothers. The track peaked at number 32 in the UK Singles Chart.

In the 2004 Groove Magazine Readers Poll, Alter Ego won three categories, taking out the award for 'Best Single' for "Rocker", 'Best Album' for Transphormer, and also 'Best Live Act'. French group Black Strobe took out 'Best Remix' honours with their remix of "Rocker".

Though the two remain friends, Alter Ego have not been active since the release of their final album in 2008. In interviews, Flügel suggested that the hiatus occurred because the two simply stopped enjoying working professionally, and following their own projects was the best way of both securing their friendship and keeping their work interesting.

In 2005, Roman Flügel went on to produce the track "Gehts Noch?", which was a worldwide hit, and was regularly played by many international DJs. Since Alter Ego became inactive, Flügel signed to Dial Records and released three solo albums, along with several EPs released on various other labels and collaborations with like-minded artists such as Simian Mobile Disco and Daniel Avery, who count Flügel's work as inspirations. In contrast to the harsh, electro-house style that made "Rocker" and "Gehts Noch?" successful, Flügel's recent work is inspired chiefly by techno and krautrock.

== Selected discography ==
=== Albums ===
- Alter Ego (1994)
- Alterism (1996) (remix album)
- Decoding the Hacker Myth (1996)
- Transphormer (2004)
- Transphormed (2005) (remix album)
- Why Not?! (2007)
- What's Next?! (2008) (remix album)
- The Lost Album (2012)

=== Singles ===
- "Rocker" [Universal CD] (2005) (AUS number 91)
- "Rocker" [Ultra 12"] (2005)
- "Betty Ford EP" (2000)
- "Slaughterhouse" (2000)
- "Absolute" (1997)
- "The Evil Needle" (1997)
- "Decoding the Hacker Myth Remixes, Vol. 1" (1996)

=== Remixes ===
- "Giving You Up" – Kylie Minogue (2005)
- "Suffer Well" – Depeche Mode (2006)
- "Psychological" – Pet Shop Boys (2006)
- "Human After All" – Daft Punk (2006)
- "Trauermusik" – Partial Arts (2007)
- "Hypercommunication" – Poni Hoax (2008)
