= Human After All (song) =

2005 song by Daft Punk

Single by Daft Punk

from the album Human After All
- Released: 21 October 2005
- Recorded: 2004
- Studio: Daft House (Paris)
- Genre: Industrial rock; electroclash; noise rock
- Length: 5:20
- Label: Virgin
- Songwriters: Thomas Bangalter; Guy-Manuel de Homem-Christo
- Producers: Daft Punk; Cédric Hervet; Gildas Loaëc

Daft Punk singles chronology
| "Technologic" (2005) | "Human After All" (2005) | "The Prime Time of Your Life" (2006) |

Music video
- "Human After All" on YouTube

"Human After All" is a song by the French electronic music duo Daft Punk, released as the third single from their third album of the same name on 21 October 2005. The single release includes remixes which appeared in the album Human After All: Remixes. "Human After All" reached number 93 on the French Singles Chart.

== Background ==
Daft Punk produced the Teriyaki Boyz song "HeartBreaker", which features elements of "Human After All". MTV Australia used the coda of "Human After All" in its "coming up" section of their channel format. A remixed version of the song made an appearance in the video game DJ Hero 2. The SebastiAn remix was featured in the PlayStation 2 game Tourist Trophy.

On the album Alive 2007, "Human After All" appears with the track "Superheroes" from the album Discovery (2001) and "Rock'n Roll" from Homework (1997). The song also appeared on the encore on the bonus disc of Alive 2007, mixed along with Together's eponymous song, a reprise of "One More Time" from Discovery and Stardust's song "Music Sounds Better with You".

== Music video ==
Daft Punk initially intended to make a music video for "Human After All", but the footage they shot for it was expanded to create the 2006 film Daft Punk's Electroma instead. On February 22, 2026, the fifth anniversary of the duo's split, the official video for the song was released, featuring footage from Electroma edited by Daft Punk's creative director Cédric Hervet.

The video shows the robotic forms of Daft Punk, portrayed by actors Peter Hurteau and Michael Reich. The duo drives in a 1987 Ferrari 412 with its license plate displaying "HUMAN". After passing through a Southwestern United States landscape, the two arrive by car at a town in Inyo County, California. The town's residents are also shown to be robots physically identical to the duo, but at different ages, with different clothing and alternating gender.

== Track listing ==
=== Vinyl ===
12-inch vinyl

Side A
| No. | Title | Length |
|---|---|---|
| 1. | "Human After All" | 5:20 |
| 2. | "Human After All" (SebastiAn remix) | 4:45 |

Side B
| No. | Title | Length |
|---|---|---|
| 3. | "Human After All" (Alter Ego remix) | 9:22 |
| Total length: | | 19:27 |

12-inch vinyl (unreleased remixes)

Side A
| No. | Title | Length |
|---|---|---|
| 1. | "Guy-Man After All" (Justice mix) | 3:58 |
| 2. | "Human After All" (Emperor Machine version) | 6:04 |

Side B
| No. | Title | Length |
|---|---|---|
| 3. | "Technologic" (Digitalism RMX) | 5:58 |
| Total length: | | 16:00 |

=== Compact Disc ===
CD maxi-single

| No. | Title | Length |
|---|---|---|
| 1. | "Human After All" | 5:20 |
| 2. | "Human After All" (Justice remix) | 3:58 |
| 3. | "Human After All" (Emperor Machine version) | 6:04 |
| 4. | "Human After All" (Alter Ego remix) | 9:22 |
| 5. | "Human After All" (SebastiAn remix) | 4:45 |
| 6. | "Human After All" (The Juan MacLean version) | 6:43 |
| Total length: | | 36:12 |

The CD featured a misprinted track list on the rear of the disc case. It listed the SebastiAn remix as the second track, the Justice remix as the third track, and the Emperor Machine version as the fifth track. A promo 12-inch single was also released with the proper track list, with side A containing the first three tracks and side B containing the remaining three.

== Charts ==
| Chart (2010) | Peak position |
|---|---|
| France (SNEP) | 93 |

== Release history ==
| Region | Date | Label | Format | Catalogue no. |
|---|---|---|---|---|
| Europe | 21 October 2005 | Virgin | 12-inch (promo) | 094634170918 |
| Europe | 28 October 2005 | Virgin | CD | 0946 3 44745 2 8 / 3 44745 2 |
| Europe | 2005 | Virgin | 12-inch | 0946 3 44738 1 1 |
| France | 6 January 2006 | Virgin | 12-inch | 094635031218 |
