= Tony Gardner (designer) =

American designer (born 1965)

- Born: September 25, 1965 (age 61); Cleveland, Ohio, U.S.
- Occupations: Makeup designer; special effects designer; puppeteer
- Years active: 1982–present

Tony Gardner (born in September 25, 1965, Cleveland, Ohio) is an American makeup designer, special effects designer and puppeteer. He has designed and created effects for many feature films, including the films Zombieland, 127 Hours, Smokin' Aces, Hairspray, Jackass Presents: Bad Grandpa, The Addams Family, Seed of Chucky, Shallow Hal and There's Something About Mary. Gardner helped create the signature helmets for Daft Punk, as well as an animatronic robot for their "Technologic" music video. He wrote and directed Daft Punk's music video for the song "The Prime Time of Your Life," which also, his two daughters were in (Brianna and Kyra) and associate produced and populated a world full of robots for the duo's feature-length directorial debut, Daft Punk's Electroma. Beyond the film-making arena, Gardner's special effects company Alterian, Inc. has also designed and created the popular GEICO Cavemen characters as well as the current iteration of Smokey Bear. Alterian's makeup effects for Johnny Knoxville's character in Jackass Presents: Bad Grandpa were nominated for an Academy Award as well as a Makeup Artist & Hair Stylist Guild Award, and won the Guild Award for Best Special Makeup Effects in the Feature Film category.

== Work ==
His first professional job was for Rick Baker on Michael Jackson's music video for the song "Thriller". Gardner appeared in the video as the first zombie to crawl out of a grave as well as the hobbling zombie whose arm falls off. His first major film project was as the head of the special effects team for The Blob. His daughter Brianna Gardner appeared in Shallow Hal (2001) as Cadence, the seven-year-old burn ward patient. Tony recommended her to the Farrelly brothers because he knew she would be capable of tolerating the extensive prosthetic burn make-up. She auditioned for and won the part.

His work on the 2010 Danny Boyle film 127 Hours received notoriety for the amputation sequences designed, engineered, and built to recreate the actual event in extreme closeup detail. The film's pre-release screenings at several film festivals have resulted in audience members requiring medical assistance. Gardner stresses though, that the desired result was accuracy and an immersion in a recreation of the experience, so that the audience experiences things through Aron Ralston's eyes.

Gardner is also noted for his work with electronic music duo Daft Punk. He helped create the signature robotic headgear worn by the duo. He was also involved in the music videos for their singles "Technologic", "Instant Crush", and "The Prime Time of Your Life", the latter of which he also directed. He worked alongside the duo as an associate producer for their first feature film Daft Punk's Electroma, a film that his company Alterian, Inc. also populated a world full of robots for.

Gardner's Alterian, Inc. designed and created the makeup effects for the film Jackass Presents: Bad Grandpa. The makeup effects for Johnny Knoxville's character were nominated for both an Academy Award for Best Makeup & Hairstyling and a Makeup Artist & Hair Stylist Guild Award in 2013. The work received the Guild Award for Best Special Makeup Effects in the Feature Film category.

Alterian’s attention to detail and realism have led to investigations into their work by the FBI, the LAPD, and in the case of their work on David O. Russell’s 1999 movie “Three Kings,” even the Arizona State Police, Missing Person’s Division, and the Mortuary Society of America.

== Filmography ==
- The Return of the Living Dead (1985) (half-corpse animation)
- ¡Three Amigos! (1986) (puppeteer) (uncredited)
- The Blob (1988) (makeup effects designer, makeup effects department head)
- Darkman (1990) (makeup effects designer, makeup effects department head)
- The Addams Family (1991) (makeup effects designer)
- Mom and Dad Save the World (1992) (puppeteer) (uncredited)
- The Bodyguard (1992) (special properties) (uncredited)
- Army of Darkness (1992) (makeup effects designer)
- Freaked (1993) (makeup effects designer)
- Hocus Pocus (1993) (puppeteer: Binx)
- Raging Angels (1995) (puppeteer)
- Warriors of Virtue (1996)
- Batman & Robin (1997) (puppeteer)
- There's Something About Mary (1998) (makeup effects designer)
- Wild Wild West (1999) (puppeteer)
- Three Kings (1999) (makeup effects designer, puppeteer)
- Freddy Got Fingered (2001) (makeup effects designer)
- Osmosis Jones (2001) (makeup designer)
- Shallow Hal (2001) (makeup effects designer, makeup effects department head)
- Say It Isn't So (2001) (puppeteer)
- Jackass: The Movie (2002) (special makeup designer)
- The SpongeBob SquarePants Movie (2004) (puppeteer)
- Seed of Chucky (2004) (special makeup designer, special makeup effects artist, animatronic effects supervisor)
- Smokin' Aces (2006) (makeup effects designer, makeup effects department head)
- Daft Punk's Electroma (2006) (robotic effects designer)
- Jackass Number Two (2006) (special makeup designer)
- Jackass 2.5 (2007) (special makeup designer)
- Hairspray (2007) (makeup effects designer, makeup effects department head)
- Zombieland (2009) (makeup effects designer)
- 127 Hours (2010) (makeup effects designer)
- Jackass 3D (2010) (special makeup effects designer)
- Jackass 3.5 (2011) (special makeup effects designer)
- Jackass Presents: Bad Grandpa (2013) (makeup effects designer)
- Curse of Chucky (2013) (animatronic characters, animatronic effects, puppeteer)
- Jackass Presents: Bad Grandpa .5 (2014) (makeup effects designer)
- Scouts Guide to the Zombie Apocalypse (2015) (makeup effects artist, makeup effects designer/creator)
- Cult of Chucky (2017) (animatronic effects supervisor, puppeteer, associate producer)
- Who Is America? (2018) (makeup effects designer, makeup effects department head, associate producer)
- Kidding (2018) (special makeup effects artist)
- Wounds (2019) (makeup effects designer, special makeup effects artist)
- Sextuplets (2019) (makeup effects designer, special effects makeup department head)
- Zombieland: Double Tap (2019) (makeup effects designer, makeup effects department head)
- Slayer: The Repentless Killogy (make up effects department head)
- Freaky (2020) (makeup effects designer, special makeup effects artist)
- Bad Hair (2020) (makeup effects department head, makeup effects designer)
- Don't Look Deeper (2020) (makeup effects department head, makeup effects designer)
- Bad Trip (2021) (makeup effects designer)
- Old (2021) (special makeup effects designer)
- Chucky (2021-2024) (puppeteer, animatronic characters and effects by, associate producer)
- Studio 666 (2022) (makeup effects designer, special makeup effects artist)
- Jackass Forever (2022) (special makeup effects designer)
- Jackass 4.5 (2022) (special makeup effects designer)

== Recognition ==
- 1990: Won Sitges-Catalonian International Film Festival Award for "Best Special Effects" for the film Darkman
- 1990: Nominated for CableACE Award for "Best Makeup" for the TV series "Swamp Thing"
- 1990: Nominated for Saturn Award for "Best Makeup" for the film Darkman
- 1992: Won Fangoria Chainsaw Award for 'Best Special Makeup Effects - Feature Films' for "Army of Darkness"
- 1994: Nominated for Saturn Award for "Best Makeup" for the film Freaked (shared with Steve Johnson and Screaming Mad George)
- 1994: Nominated for Saturn Award for "Best Makeup" for the film Army of Darkness
- 2000: Nominated for OFTA Award for "Best Makeup and Hairstyling" for the film Titus
- 2008: Nominated for OFTA Award for "Best Makeup and Hairstyling" for the film Hairspray
- 2014: Won Hollywood Makeup Artist and Hair Stylist Guild Award for 'Best Special Makeup Effects - Feature Films' for Jackass Presents: Bad Grandpa (shared with Stephen Prouty)
- 2017: Nominated for Hollywood Makeup Artist & Hair Stylist Guild Award for 'Best Special Makeup Effects - Commercials & Music Videos' for the Foo Fighters' "Run"
