= Technologic =

2005 song by Daft Punk

Single by Daft Punk

from the album Human After All
- Released: 14 June 2005
- Recorded: 2004
- Genre: Techno; electronic rock
- Length: 4:44 (album version); 2:47 (radio edit)
- Label: Virgin
- Songwriters: Thomas Bangalter; Guy-Manuel de Homem-Christo
- Producer: Daft Punk

Daft Punk singles chronology
| "Robot Rock" (2005) | "Technologic" (2005) | "Human After All" (2005) |

Music video
- "Technologic" on YouTube

"Technologic" is a song by the French duo Daft Punk from their third studio album, Human After All (2005). It was released as the second single on 14 June 2005. The music video for "Technologic" was directed by Daft Punk.

== Composition ==
In the song, an electronically transposed voice chants technological commands. For example, "Touch it, bring it, pay it, watch it, turn it, leave it, start, format it" are spoken in rhythm to a beat.

A portion of the vocals were altered and sampled in the Busta Rhymes single "Touch It", produced by Swizz Beatz. Subsequently, elements of both "Touch It" and "Technologic" were remixed together and featured in Daft Punk's live album Alive 2007.

== Music video ==
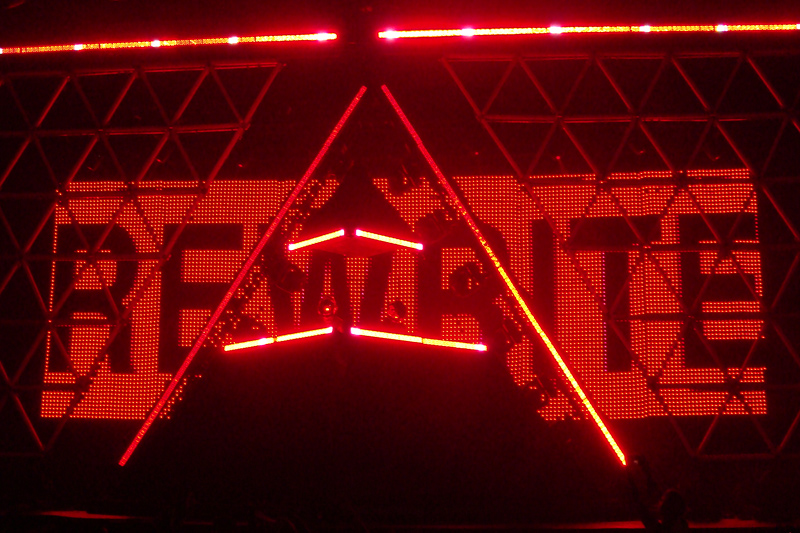
Live Daft Punk performance featuring "Technologic"

The music video for "Technologic" is the third directed by Daft Punk, following "Fresh" and "Robot Rock". The video features Guy-Manuel de Homem-Christo and Thomas Bangalter on a pyramid-themed stage playing the bass guitars shown in the single cover. The lyrics flash as individual words of text on a television monitor set on the stage. The video features a robot character that appears to chant the lyrics of the song. The character is situated in front of the flashing screen between the duo and later appears in a darkened room watching itself on television. The robot was created by Tony Gardner and his team at Alterian, Inc. The music video is included in the CD and DVD edition of the album Musique Vol. 1 1993–2005.

The pyramid design used in the video is similar to the scheme used in Daft Punk's live performances during the Alive 2006/2007 tour. The flashing lyrical text is integrated with the live version of "Technologic" on a large light-emitting diode display used for their shows. Homem-Christo stated, "In the 'Technologic' video, this little robot [is] in the pyramid and we thought it would be funny to have the two of us in the bigger pyramid."

== Other media ==
The song was featured in an iPod advertisement shown in the summer of 2005. It was also featured in an ad for the Motorola E398 mobile-phone, aired in early 2005 in Brazil. Additionally, the song was featured in an episode of The O.C.. In 2009, it was used in a Lincoln MKS commercial, and in a series of TV advertisements for the Alfa Romeo MiTo. It is a playable track on the iOS games Tap Tap Revenge and Tap Tap Dance, and was sampled for the video game DJ Hero. In an episode of the TV show America's Best Dance Crew, crew Kaba Modern performed to a master mix of this song on 7 February 2008. "Technologic" was also featured in the game Dance Central 2.

A portion of the vocals were also altered for the Hannah Wants single "Rhymes", which reached number 13 on the UK Singles Chart in 2015. A portion of the vocals were sampled in Dua Lipa's performance of her song, "Hallucinate", during her Studio 2054 livestream concert on 27 November 2020. and later on her Future Nostalgia Tour performance of the same song.

== Track listings ==
CD Single (0 94633 00360 6)
| No. | Title | Length |
|---|---|---|
| 1. | "Technologic" | 4:43 |
| 2. | "Technologic" (Vitalic Remix) | 5:24 |
| 3. | "Technologic" (Peaches No Logic Remix) | 4:35 |
| 4. | "Technologic" (Basement Jaxx Kontrol Mixx) | 5:29 |
| 5. | "Technologic" (Music Video) | 2:46 |
| Total length: | | 22:57 |

12-inch maxi single
| No. | Title | Length |
|---|---|---|
| 1. | "Technologic" | 4:43 |
| 2. | "Technologic" (Peaches No Logic remix) | 4:35 |
| 3. | "Technologic" (Vitalic remix) | 5:24 |
| 4. | "Technologic" (Basement Jaxx Kontrol Mixx) | 5:29 |
| Total length: | | 20:11 |

== Charts ==
Weekly chart performance for "Technologic"
| Chart (2005) | Peak position |
|---|---|
| Australia (ARIA) | 64 |
| Belgium (Ultratip Bubbling Under Wallonia) | 15 |
| Germany (GfK) | 82 |
| Ireland (IRMA) | 38 |
| Ireland Dance (IRMA) | 5 |
| Scotland Singles (OCC) | 30 |
| UK Singles (OCC) | 40 |
| UK Dance (OCC) | 1 |
| US Bubbling Under Hot 100 Singles (Billboard) | 16 |

| Chart (2008) | Peak position |
|---|---|
| Italy (FIMI) | 22 |
| Switzerland (Schweizer Hitparade) | 63 |

| Chart (2010) | Peak position |
|---|---|
| Sweden (Sverigetopplistan) | 29 |
