= Da Funk =

1995 single by Daft Punk

Single by Daft Punk

from the album Homework
- B-side: "Rollin' and Scratchin'" (Soma); "Musique" (Virgin)
- Released: 8 May 1995
- Genre: Acid house; big beat; dance
- Length: 5:29 (album version); 3:50 (long edit); 2:41 (short edit)
- Label: Soma; Virgin
- Songwriters: Thomas Bangalter; Guy-Manuel de Homem-Christo
- Producer: Daft Punk

Daft Punk singles chronology
"The New Wave" (1994)	"Da Funk" (1995)	"Indo Silver Club" (1996)

Audio sample
- "Da Funk": file; help

Music video
- "Da Funk" on YouTube

"Da Funk" is an instrumental track by French electronic music duo Daft Punk, initially released as a 12-inch single in May 1995 by Soma and Virgin Records and later included on their debut album, Homework (1997). Prior to its inclusion on the album, "Da Funk" received little attention and was limited to 2,000 copies. The song and its accompanying music video directed by Spike Jonze are considered classics of 1990s house music. It went on to sell 30,000 copies in 1997. A reversed clip of the song was also released on Homework as "Funk Ad", which is the final track on the album.

Daft Punk produced "Da Funk" after listening to American G-funk records: the bass was composed using a Roland TB-303 synthesizer. A siren was originally going to be the riff before later being replaced to reflect the style the duo were going for. They wanted to make a song in the style similar to that of gangsta rap and electro. Bangalter also stated that the song's melody is meant to be reminiscent of Italian producer and composer Giorgio Moroder. The song received acclaim from music critics and has been listed as one of the greatest dance songs of all time by Rolling Stone.

== Background ==
"Da Funk" was initially released as a 12-inch single on 8 May 1995 under the Soma Quality Recordings label, with the B-side "Rollin' & Scratchin'". The pressing was limited to 2,000 copies and was "virtually ignored" according to a Muzik magazine feature at the time. The single received a boost in popularity when the Chemical Brothers incorporated it into their live shows. Subsequently, the British duo's song "Life Is Sweet" was remixed by Daft Punk for a single release in August 1995. The track also received early support from veteran BBC Radio 1 DJ Annie Nightingale.

Daft Punk eventually signed with Virgin Records after a bidding war amongst several labels. "Da Funk" was re-released on 3 February 1997 by Virgin with the B-side "Musique", a track that later appeared on the anthology Musique Vol. 1 1993–2005. The duo's debut album Homework features "Da Funk" as well as a reversed excerpt titled "Funk Ad". Daft Punk expressed that they wanted to make the album balanced by distributing tracks evenly across each of the four vinyl sides. The Homework release of "Da Funk" sold 30,000 copies.

== Composition ==
In an interview with Fredrik Strage for Swedish magazine Pop #23, Bangalter said that "Da Funk" was made after listening to American G-funk for weeks. He stated that the duo wanted to make a song in the style of gangsta rap. They tried to "murk [...] sounds" as much as possible. However, Bangalter said that "no one has ever compared it to hip hop." According to him, the melody and the synthesizers used in the song are reminiscent of music producer Giorgio Moroder and genres such as electro.

The riff was originally a siren sound, but was changed to reflect the "gangsta rap" aesthetic they were trying to achieve. The bassline was created with a Roland TB-303 synthesizer Bangalter purchased in 1993. He had created several patterns with the 303 beforehand: "When we were looking for a bassline, we listened to some of [the] ones I'd already programmed and took the one that fit best." Da Funk is written in the key of G minor, and composed with a tempo of 111 beats per minute.

== Critical reception ==
Larry Flick from Billboard magazine described the track as a "wriggling instrumental combination of cutting-edge electronic dance and Cameo-styled funk". Andy Beevers from Music Week's RM Dance Update gave it a full score of five out of five, adding that "this single is a bit of a refresher for those who have been wondering why there is so much hype surrounding the French duo." He explained further, "'Da Funk' still sounds incredibly fresh with its huge distorted synth riffs, thumping rhythm and scratchy guitar mashed up to create a mutant disco gem."

Everett True highlighted it as a single of the week in Melody Maker. Andy Crysell from NME wrote, "Two young Parisians abduct the insane lovechild of a one-night stand shared by Hardfloor's fittest 303s and a '70s superfly jam to devise a title track rich in troubled funk and wiggly acid and a flip of murderous hammering house." Dave Fawbert from ShortList declared it as "sensational", stating that it "manages to combine about six different outrageously funky parts over the top of an unyielding, solitary, bass note. When the 303 finally kicks in, it's electro ecstasy." David Sinclair from The Times commented, "Another rave standard goes overground."

== Music video ==
The protagonist Charles in the music video for "Da Funk"

"What was special was seeing the streets of New York City react in real time to the character of Charles the Dog Boy as if he was real. Because of the location and the nature of how it was put together, aside from a few knowing smiles, most people just accepted it as reality and that was kind of amazing. Half the people totally ignored Charles, as if he was just any other character on the streets, and that was part of what made it so magic. I was laughing to myself all the time."

— Tony Maxwell

The track's music video was directed by Spike Jonze in February 1997 and titled Big City Nights. It focuses on the character Charles (Tony Maxwell, drummer of the band That Dog), an anthropomorphic dog in a leg cast with a crutch. Charles, who has lived in New York City for only one month, is shown walking around with a boombox blasting "Da Funk" at a high volume. His hobbled walk is mocked by a pair of children. He is turned down when he attempts to participate in a public survey. His boombox annoys a bookseller on the sidewalk from whom Charles buys a paperback novel titled Big City Nights.

Charles meets a woman named Beatrice (Catherine Kellner), who was once his childhood neighbor. They agree to have dinner together at her home, traveling by way of a city bus. Beatrice boards the bus, but Charles is startled by a sign stating "NO RADIOS". As he is unable to turn off his boombox (which is earlier indicated to have a broken/missing volume button) he reluctantly remains at the bus stop, as the bus drives off with Beatrice. Although the video has drawn several interpretations, Bangalter has stated that the music video has no story or meaning.

== Impact and legacy ==
The prominent French club magazine Coda named "Da Funk" the number one single with 33 percent of the vote. In 2003, Q ranked it number 670 in their list of the "1001 Best Songs Ever". Same year, English music journalist Paul Morley included it in his list of "Greatest Pop Single of All Time". In September 2010, Pitchfork Media included the song at number 18 on their "Top 200 Tracks of the 90s". In 2011, it was featured in the video games Top Spin 4 and Ubisoft's Just Dance 3. And Slant Magazine listed it at number 93 in their ranking of "The 100 Best Singles of the 1990s" that year.

In 2012, NME listed it in their "100 Best Songs of the 1990s", at number eight. In 2021, Mixdown featured "Da Funk" in their list of "The 13 most iconic TB-303 basslines of all time". In 2022, Classic Pop ranked it number 17 in their list of the top 40 dance tracks from the 90's. Same year, Rolling Stone ranked "Da Funk" number 23 in their list of "200 Greatest Dance Songs of All Time".

== Track listing ==
CD single (Virgin 8939202)
No.	Title	Length
1.	"Da Funk" (Side A)	5:33
2.	"Musique" (Side B)	6:52
Total length:		12:25

CD maxi single (Virgin DPRO-12232)
No.	Title	Music	Length
1.	"Da Funk" (short edit)		2:41
2.	"Da Funk" (long edit)		3:48
3.	"Da Funk" (LP version)		5:32
4.	"Da Funk" (Ten Minutes of Funk mix)	Armand van Helden	10:08
5.	"Da Funk" (Callout Research Hook)		0:10
Total length:			22:19

7-inch single (Virgin VSLH 1625)
No.	Title	Length
1.	"Da Funk" (long edit)	3:48
2.	"Da Funk"	5:33
Total length:		9:21

12-inch maxi single (Soma 025)
No.	Title	Length
1.	"Da Funk" (Side A)	5:35
2.	"Rollin' & Scratchin'" (Side B)	7:40
Total length:		13:15

CD maxi single (Virgin 8385872)
No.	Title	Length
1.	"Da Funk"	5:33
2.	"Musique"	6:52
3.	"Da Funk" (Ten Minutes of Funk mix)	10:08
Total length:		22:28

== Charts ==
=== Weekly charts ===
Weekly chart performance for "Da Funk"
Chart (1997)	Peak position
Australia (ARIA)	31
Belgium (Ultratop 50 Flanders)	20
Belgium (Ultratop 50 Wallonia)	9
Belgium Dance (Ultratop Flanders)	14
Canada Dance/Urban (RPM)	1
Europe (Eurochart Hot 100)	25
Finland (Suomen virallinen lista)	16
France (SNEP)	7
France Airplay (SNEP)	10
Iceland (Íslenski Listinn Topp 40)	5
Ireland (IRMA)	20
Israel (Israeli Singles Chart)	21
Italy (Musica e dischi)	8
Mainland Europe (Border Breakers)	4
Netherlands (Single Top 100)	96
Scottish Singles Sales (Official Charts)	5
Sweden (Sverigetopplistan)	33
UK Singles (Official Charts)	7
US Bubbling Under Hot 100 (Billboard)	8
US Dance Club Songs (Billboard)	1
US Dance Singles Sales (Billboard)	26

=== Year-end charts ===
Year-end chart performance for "Da Funk"
Chart (1997)	Position
Belgium (Ultratop 50 Wallonia)	62
Canada Dance/Urban (RPM)	8
France (SNEP)	72
Iceland (Íslenski Listinn Topp 40)	35
UK Singles (OCC)	156

== Certifications ==
Certifications and sales for "Da Funk"
Region	Certification	Certified units/sales
France (SNEP)	Silver	125,000^{*}
United Kingdom (BPI)	Silver	200,000^{‡}
^{*} Sales figures based on certification alone.^{‡} Sales+streaming figures based on certification alone.

== Release history ==
Release dates and formats for "Da Funk"
Region	Date	Format(s)	Ref.
United Kingdom	8 May 1995	12-inch vinyl	
United Kingdom	3 February 1997	12-inch vinyl; CD; cassette	
United States	15 April 1997	Alternative radio	
United States	24 March 1998	Rhythmic contemporary; contemporary hit radio	
