= Giorgio by Moroder =

2013 song by Daft Punk

Song by Daft Punk

from the album Random Access Memories
- Released: 17 May 2013
- Recorded: November 23, 2011 – May 2012
- Genre: Eurodisco; progressive rock; spoken word; electronic; jazz rock
- Length: 9:04
- Label: Columbia
- Songwriters: Thomas Bangalter; Guy-Manuel de Homem-Christo; Giovanni Moroder
- Producer: Daft Punk

Audio video
- "Giorgio by Moroder" (Official Audio) on YouTube

"Giorgio by Moroder" is a song written and recorded by French electronic music duo Daft Punk for their fourth studio album, Random Access Memories (2013). It is the third track on the album. The song features a monologue by Italian musician Giorgio Moroder, who speaks about his early life and musical career. "Giorgio by Moroder" charted in France and Sweden due to downloads of the album.

== Background ==
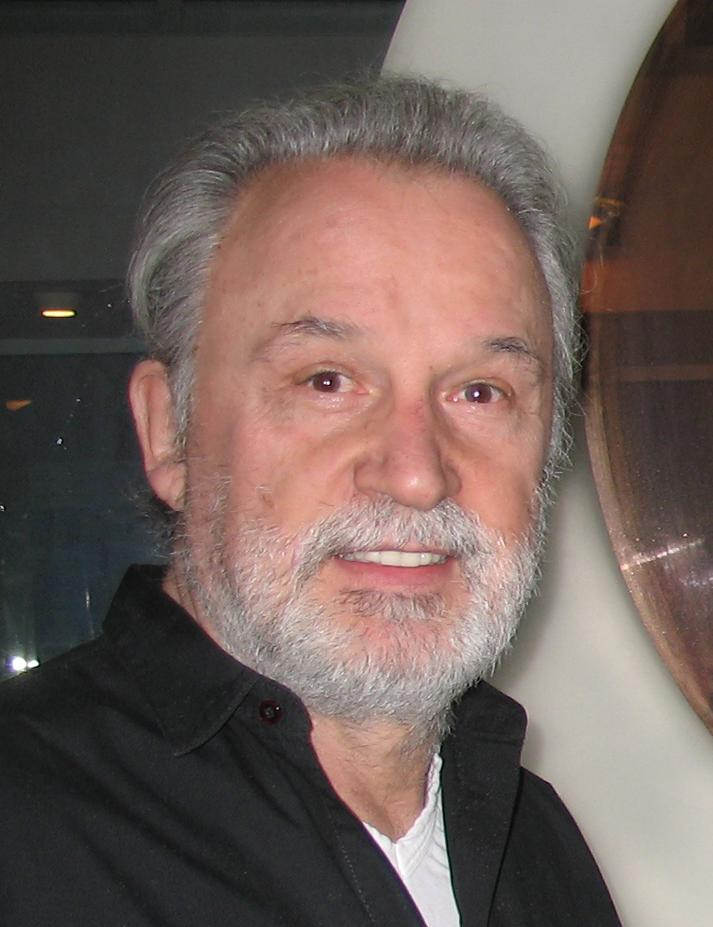
"Giorgio by Moroder" features the voice and story of Giorgio Moroder.

Giorgio Moroder first publicly mentioned his collaboration with Daft Punk in May 2012; he revealed that he had recorded a monologue about his life for a track on the album. Daft Punk's pitch to Moroder was to conduct an extensive interview with him, and to edit excerpts of the resulting monologue into a documentary song. "Giorgio by Moroder" was created to serve as a metaphor about musical freedom, as Daft Punk believed that a monologue by Moroder about his career would serve as an analogy for music's history regarding exploration of genres and tastes. The duo had been in contact with Moroder in relation to a possible contribution for the Tron: Legacy (2010) film score, but this never occurred.

Moroder clarified that he was not involved in the composition of the track: "They did not let me get involved at all. Thomas asked me if I wanted to tell the story of my life. Then they would know what to do with it." Moroder further explained that he was unaware of how the duo would incorporate his monologue, at one point thinking the duo "might cut it up into a rap". Daft Punk based the composition on a demo the duo had made years earlier, specifically because they felt that the piece resembled Moroder's style. Among the topics Moroder spoke of in his monologue was his creative process behind Donna Summer's album I Remember Yesterday (1977) and its closing track "I Feel Love". Upon hearing "Giorgio by Moroder" in complete form, he felt that it had been inspired by his own recordings, particularly "I Feel Love".

== Production ==
Peter Franco, who served as an audio engineer on the album, recalled that Daft Punk had wanted to conduct some tests at Henson Recording Studios early in the production process. The arpeggio heard throughout "Giorgio by Moroder" was captured in these initial sessions, "with layers of that arpeggio played via MIDI through different synths to create that great sound." Franco described the tests as "very fun and loose sessions", and was pleasantly surprised that some of the parts ended up in the final product.

When Moroder arrived in the studio to record his monologue, he was initially perplexed that the booth contained multiple microphones; he wondered if the extra equipment was a precaution in case one of the microphones broke. The recording engineer explained that the microphones varied with origin dates that ranged from the 1960s to the 21st century, and that each microphone would be used to represent the different decades in Moroder's life. The engineer added that although most listeners would not be able to distinguish between each microphone, Bangalter would know the difference. Nile Rodgers was also present during the voice recording sessions, which took place over the course of two days.

Moroder did not receive an update on the progress of the song until six months prior to the release of the album; Moroder happened to be in the same studio in Paris where Daft Punk had been working at that point. He was told by the engineer there that "Giorgio by Moroder" was coming along well, but that the engineer was not at liberty to discuss the track further. Moroder later expressed that he could have been more precise when the duo had interviewed him, as he felt his recording had faltering grammar in a few places. He also noted that if he ever decided to write an autobiography, he would ask Daft Punk for the complete session tapes of "Giorgio by Moroder" to use as a basis. A 10" vinyl disc containing an extended interview from the sessions is included in a deluxe box set release of Random Access Memories.

Much like the rest of the album, "Giorgio by Moroder" makes use of studio musicians for most of the instrumentation. Daft Punk conveyed their ideas to the musicians via sheet music and in some instances by humming melodies. Bangalter recalled an example in which he hummed a complex drum and bass line to Omar Hakim, who replicated and improved upon it for "Giorgio by Moroder". As the duo sought to avoid using stock audio samples, Daft Punk recorded new sound effects with the help of professional foley artists from Warner Bros. They produced the sounds of a busy restaurant by placing microphones in front of a group of people using forks.

== Composition ==
The song is played in the key of A minor, in common time and at a tempo of 113 beats per minute. Zach Baron of GQ referred to the piece as "Moroder haltingly talk[ing] about his early days as a German club warrior over a click track." Mixmag analyses elaborated that the narration is complemented with changes in instrumentation for dramatic effect: As one review pointed out, "Moroder explains how he 'knew he needed a click' and a click track duly starts a basic percussion line". Another noted that, "he informs us that his 'friends call him Giorgio' before the track explodes into an arpeggiated synth dream". Q magazine detailed that the composition transitions from "electro [...] into pure disco into vast orchestral beauty into a blizzard of syndrums" and builds until it reaches a conventional house music beat. Matthew Horton of NME remarked that the song concludes with "the bass bounc[ing] down comically to nothing." Critics have also noted the similarities between the structure of "Giorgio by Moroder" and that of Cerrone's song "Supernature".

== Personnel ==
- Daft Punk – production, modular synthesizer, keyboards
- Giorgio Moroder – voice
- Paul Jackson, Jr. – guitar
- Greg Leisz – pedal steel guitar
- Chris Caswell – orchestration, keyboards
- Nathan East – bass
- James Genus – bass
- John "JR" Robinson – drums
- Omar Hakim – drums
- Quinn – percussion

== Charts ==
=== Weekly charts ===
Chart (2013)	Peak position
France (SNEP)	54
Sweden (Sverigetopplistan)	57
UK Streaming (Official Streaming Chart)	13
US Hot Dance/Electronic Songs (Billboard)	22

=== Year-end charts ===
Chart (2013)	Position
US Hot Dance/Electronic Songs (Billboard)	57
