= Touch (Daft Punk song) =

2013 song by Daft Punk featuring Paul Williams

Song by Daft Punk featuring Paul Williams

from the album Random Access Memories
- Released: 17 May 2013
- Genre: Disco; progressive rock; jazz fusion; ambient
- Length: 8:19
- Label: Columbia
- Songwriters: Thomas Bangalter; Chris Caswell; Guy-Manuel de Homem-Christo; Paul Williams
- Producer: Daft Punk

Audio video
- "Daft Punk - Touch (Official Audio) ft. Paul Williams" on YouTube

"Touch" is a song written and recorded by the French electronic music duo Daft Punk and American singer-songwriter Paul Williams. "Touch" is the seventh track from the group's fourth studio album, Random Access Memories (2013). The song was featured in the American thriller TV series, Mr. Robot, and Daft Punk's video announcing their disbandment, "Epilogue".

== Composition ==
While working with Chris Caswell, Daft Punk mentioned they had been heavily influenced by the 1974 film Phantom of the Paradise, starring Paul Williams. Caswell offered to arrange a meeting between Williams and the duo, leading to Williams singing on the track and writing lyric treatments for a few tracks on the album. Daft Punk had an initial melody for the song, but, when Caswell arranged a counter-melody for string accompaniment, Daft Punk preferred Caswell's. This became the melody Williams sang to and led to Caswell receiving a songwriter credit for the track.

"Touch" is a multi-part ballad in common time. The track is performed in the key of F-sharp minor, with a tempo of 91 BPM except for a faster middle section at 116 BPM. Music journalists described the song musically as disco, progressive rock, and jazz fusion. Mark Richardson of Pitchfork described the track as "over-the-top" and ambitious, with a "Cluster-fied spacey intro, some showtune balladry, a 4/4 disco section complete with swing music trills, and a sky-scraping choir, all in service of a basic lyrical idea: love is the answer and you've got to hold on." Nick Decosemo of Mixmag compared "Touch" to rock ballads heard in musicals similar to Jesus Christ Superstar, additionally calling it "part Brian Eno ambient experimentation, part musical theatre, part gospel epic".

== "2021 Epilogue" version ==
"Touch (2021 Epilogue)"

Song by Daft Punk featuring Paul Williams

from the album Random Access Memories (10th Anniversary Edition)
- Released: 22 February 2021
- Length: 3:00
- Label: Columbia
- Songwriters: Thomas Bangalter; Chris Caswell; Guy-Manuel de Homem-Christo; Paul Williams
- Producers: Thomas Bangalter; Guy-Manuel de Homem-Christo

Audio video
- "Touch (2021 Epilogue) (feat. Paul Williams)" on YouTube

In February 2021, a version of "Touch" was featured in Daft Punk's eight-minute video announcing the group's disbandment, entitled "Epilogue". The video shows a part of the ending from the group's 2006 film Electroma in which one member of Daft Punk explodes while the other walks away, after which a rendition of "Touch" is played, featuring an orchestra and a choir. The video has amassed over 29 million views on YouTube. The version from the epilogue video was released as part of the 10th anniversary edition reissue of the album.

== Personnel ==
Credits adapted from Random Access Memories liner notes.

- Daft Punk - production, vocals, modular synthesizer
- Paul Williams - vocals
- Paul Jackson, Jr - guitar
- Greg Leisz - lap steel guitar
- Chris Caswell - keyboards
- Thomas Bloch - ondes martenot
- James Genus - bass
- Omar Hakim - drums
