= Contact (Daft Punk song) =

2013 song by Daft Punk

Song by Daft Punk

from the album Random Access Memories
- Released: 17 May 2013
- Studio: Gang (Paris)
- Genre: Electronic rock; progressive rock; krautrock
- Length: 6:23
- Label: Columbia
- Songwriters: Thomas Bangalter; Guy-Manuel de Homem-Christo; Stéphane Quême; Garth Porter; Tony Mitchell; Daryl Braithwaite
- Producers: Daft Punk; DJ Falcon

Music video
- "Contact" on YouTube

"Contact" is a song by French electronic music duo Daft Punk. It is the thirteenth and final track from the duo's fourth studio album Random Access Memories, released on 17 May 2013. The track was written and produced by the duo, with additional writing and co-production by DJ Falcon. Daryl Braithwaite, Tony Mitchell, and Garth Porter are also credited as writers due to the song containing a sample of "We Ride Tonight" by Australian rock band the Sherbs. The song includes audio from the Apollo 17 mission, courtesy of NASA and Captain Eugene Cernan. Due to digital downloads of Random Access Memories, the song charted at number 46 on the French Singles Chart and at number 24 on the Billboard Dance/Electronic Songs chart.

== Production ==
"Contact" was produced with DJ Falcon, who had previously worked with Thomas Bangalter as a duo called Together. Falcon is also a Roulé labelmate with Bangalter, the founder of Roulé. "Contact" begins with a sample of "We Ride Tonight" by The Sherbs. The sample was previously used by Bangalter and Falcon as part of a DJ set by Together in 2002. The set also featured Cassius. Daryl Braithwaite of The Sherbs had been informed of the sampling in "Contact" before the Daft Punk song was released. He also specified that he, Tony Mitchell and Garth Porter of The Sherbs would be credited as co-writers of "Contact" because of the sample, and thus would receive royalties.

Eugene Cernan's sample
Astronaut Eugene Cernan describes a "bright object" on his capsule window.

Falcon noted that when he worked on "Contact" with Daft Punk in Paris, they felt that it needed something akin to a countdown. NASA was eventually contacted, and they gladly gave the duo access to all of their mission recordings to sample. Daft Punk and Falcon settled on an excerpt where someone was called "Bob", as that was Falcon's skating nickname when he was first introduced to Bangalter and Guy-Manuel de Homem-Christo. The NASA sample features a recording of Eugene Cernan from the Apollo 17 mission, in which he observes a flashing object from a window of his capsule. It was later surmised that the particle was a discarded rocket stage. Bangalter emphasized the choice of Cernan, the last man to leave the surface of the Moon on the final Apollo mission, being used to end the album.

The modular synthesizer on "Contact" was performed by Daft Punk and Falcon, while bass and drums were performed by James Genus and Omar Hakim, respectively. The track is said by Q Magazine to be composed of orchestral and synthesizer riffs, progressive layers and concludes with what Louis Lepron of Konbini called a "sharp guitar chord". Falcon recalled that upon playback of the completed "Contact", the studio speakers had blown out as a result of the sounds from the end of the track. He likened the effect to the end of a rock concert where guitars are thrown to the floor. NME interpreted the sound as "not unlike a huge pyramid blasting off into space", a reference to the stage visuals of Daft Punk's Alive 2007 tour.

== Music video ==
In the video game Fortnite, a game mode titled the Daft Punk Experience launched on 27 September 2025, featuring interactive arenas that incorporate music and visuals from the duo's history. The project was developed by Epic Games and Magnopus in collaboration with Cédric Hervet, creative director for Daft Punk. An altered version of the experience's opening sequence was released as the official music video of "Contact" on 7 November 2025.

== Personnel ==
Personnel adapted from album's liner notes.

- Daft Punk – modular synthesizer
- DJ Falcon – modular synthesizer
- James Genus – bass
- Omar Hakim – drums

== Charts ==
=== Weekly charts ===
Chart (2013)	Peak position
France (SNEP)	46
US Hot Dance/Electronic Songs (Billboard)	24

=== Year-end charts ===
Chart (2013)	Position
US Hot Dance/Electronic Songs (Billboard)	68
