= Doin' It Right =

2013 single by Daft Punk featuring Panda Bear

Single by Daft Punk featuring Panda Bear

from the album Random Access Memories
- Released: 3 September 2013
- Recorded: 2012
- Genre: Electro
- Length: 4:11
- Label: Columbia
- Songwriters: Thomas Bangalter; Guy-Manuel de Homem-Christo; Noah Lennox
- Producer: Daft Punk

Daft Punk singles chronology
| "Lose Yourself to Dance" (2013) | "Doin' It Right" (2013) | "Instant Crush" (2013) |

Panda Bear singles chronology
| "Surfer's Hymn" (2011) | "Doin' It Right" (2013) | "Boys Latin" (2014) |

Audio video
- "Doin' It Right" on YouTube

"Doin' It Right" is a song by the French electronic music duo Daft Punk featuring the American musician Panda Bear of the band Animal Collective. It is a track on Daft Punk's fourth album Random Access Memories (2013), and was the last to be recorded for the album. The song was distributed to American alternative radio stations on 3 September 2013 as the album's third single. Prior to this, the song appeared on record charts in France, the United States and the United Kingdom due to digital downloads of the album. "Doin' It Right" received a positive critical reception, with some reviewers calling it the album's best song.

== Background ==
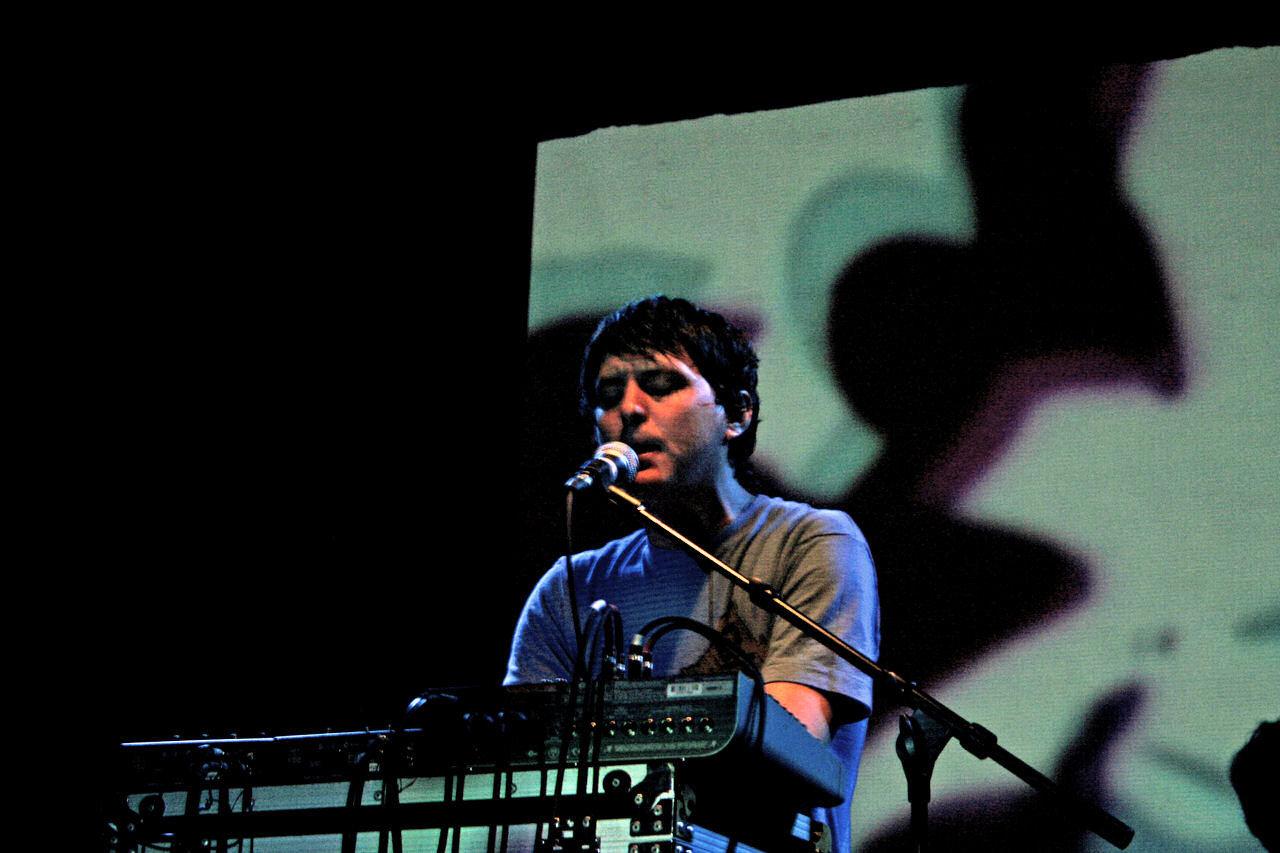
"Doin' It Right" features vocals by Animal Collective's Panda Bear.

"Doin' It Right" was the last song to be recorded for Random Access Memories. Noah Lennox, better known by his stage name Panda Bear, had first heard of Daft Punk through the music video of the song "Around the World", which introduced him to many aspects of electronic dance music. He later asked the duo to remix an Animal Collective song, which they declined. A request to remix a solo Panda Bear track was also refused by Daft Punk as they no longer had interest in doing "that kind of thing". The duo however would keep Panda Bear in mind for a collaboration, and invited him to the Random Access Memories sessions in Paris a year and a half later.

Lennox's contribution was recorded within a three-day window, which went against his usual approach of gestating an idea over a long period. He recalled that after the microphones in the studio were prepared and tested for his voice, he was instructed to simply "do something good". He initially tried several ideas, none of which resonated with the group in the studio. The idea that became "Doin' It Right" came about very late in the sessions on a whim, to which Daft Punk reacted positively. Lennox remarked that his intention was to make a song that was neither Panda Bear nor Daft Punk, but to "hit a target that was perfectly in the middle of us. I definitely felt like I was out of my comfort zone, but that's ultimately what the whole song is about."

== Composition ==
"Doin' It Right"
"Doin' It Right" includes a drum beat, vocals by Panda Bear, and a vocoder-loop.

Daft Punk referred to "Doin' It Right" as the only purely electronic piece on the album, with a modern style. Unlike the rest of Random Access Memories, the instrumental accompaniment was achieved without session musicians and consists solely of a modular synthesizer performed by Daft Punk. Jeremy Abbott of Mixmag noted that, "Light and airy synths are introduced half way through to make this a fantastic understated ballad." The song is in the key of E♭ minor, and performs in common time at a tempo of 89 beats per minute. The vocal range is two octaves. The chord progression of A♭sus2—A♭m—G♭/B♭—C♭sus2—C♭—D♭—E♭sus2—E♭m—D♭—C♭sus—C♭ is followed throughout.

"Doin' It Right" is a snare-and-vocoder-driven track with vocals by Panda Bear, and a vocoder loop singing the lyric "Doing it right/everybody will be dancing/and we'll feeling it right/everybody will be dancing/and be doing it right/everybody will be dancing/and we'll feeling it right/everybody will be dancing tonight". The vocoder part stops when Panda Bear sings the lyric "If you lose your way tonight/ That's how you know the magic's right," which, according to Pitchfork Media, is "presumably for emphasis, and we know that magic is important to Daft Punk." Regarding the musical style, a Clash review noted that the song has "a bit of an Afrika Bambaataa-proto-electro vibe" while Pitchfork called it "a terrifically uplifting bit of electro-pop." Critics have also noted that the rhythmic structure resembles that of trap music.

== Critical reception ==
Pitchfork Media gave the song a very positive review and designated it "Best New Music." GQ's Zach Baron described "Doin' It Right" as effectively being a Panda Bear solo track that happened to be part of the album. NME noted that, "There's a Trojan Robot for a few seconds, then he opens his belly and out pops Panda Bear to sack the ancient city." Both Pitchfork and Paperblog considered the track the best out of the entire album, with Pitchfork calling the track the LP's "strongest statement of purpose, a moment where two artists with a focus on self-betterment align their chakras," and Paperblog calling it the "most highly-anticipated." Spin called Panda Bear's lyrics in the song "as lysergic and endearing as ever." Refinery29 wrote that, "for fans of Daft Punk, this is the kind of core track you're guaranteed to love; hardcore Panda Bear lovers might have a slightly harder time latching on," while Billboard said the song gave "a fascinating contrast, although, oddly enough, Panda Bear's earnest cries are more successful than the tiresome mechanics of the Daft Punk vocals." The A.V. Club found the collaboration to be a "befitting and well-executed pairing." In contrast to the positive critical response, PopMatters called it the only letdown of the album, as they felt it went away from the LP's concept "entirely both in style and in production (being the only fully electronic track) and feels like a guest production someone forcefully crammed into the tracklist."

== Track listing ==
Promotional single

1. "Doin' It Right" – 4:14

== Personnel ==
Credits adapted from Random Access Memories liner notes.

- Daft Punk – production, vocals, modular synthesizer
- Panda Bear – vocals

== Chart positions ==
=== Weekly charts ===
| Chart (2013) | Peak position |
|---|---|
| France (SNEP) | 63 |
| South Korea International Songs (GAON) | 42 |
| UK Singles (Official Charts Company) | 193 |
| US Bubbling Under Hot 100 (Billboard) | 11 |
| US Hot Dance/Electronic Songs (Billboard) | 17 |

=== Year-end charts ===
| Chart (2013) | Position |
|---|---|
| US Dance/Electronic Songs (Billboard) | 38 |

== Certifications ==
| Region | Certification | Certified units/sales |
|---|---|---|
| Canada (Music Canada) | Gold | 40,000^{‡} |
| United States (RIAA) | Gold | 500,000^{‡} |
^{‡} Sales+streaming figures based on certification alone.

== Release history ==
| Region | Date | Format | Label |
|---|---|---|---|
| United States | 3 September 2013 | Alternative radio | Columbia |

== Other versions ==
In June 2013, an unofficial remix of "Doin' It Right" was released by producer Nicolas Jaar and musician Dave Harrington of the band Darkside, as part of their remix album Daftside. Jaar had previously released remixes of tracks by Grizzly Bear and Brian Eno. In 2016, "Doin' It Right" was remixed by K?d incorporating a mixture of various electronic music styles.
