= We Ride Tonight =

Single by The Sherbs

from the album Defying Gravity
- B-side: "Some People"
- Released: May 1982
- Genre: Rock
- Length: 3:59
- Label: Atco
- Songwriters: Garth Porter, Tony Mitchell, Daryl Braithwaite
- Producers: Richard Lush, The Sherbs

The Sherbs singles chronology
"Some People" (1982)	"We Ride Tonight" (1982)	"Don't Throw It All Away" (1982)

Audio
- "We Ride Tonight" on YouTube

"We Ride Tonight" is a song by Australian band The Sherbs, released in May 1982. It was released from the band's ninth studio album Defying Gravity. The song reached at number 26 on the US Mainstream Rock in June 1982. The song was written by the Sherbet band members Garth Porter, Tony Mitchell and Daryl Braithwaite. The B-side is "Some People".

The song was sampled by the French electronic duo Daft Punk for their song "Contact" in 2013.

== Track listing ==
All tracks are written by Garth Porter, Tony Mitchell and Daryl Braithwaite.

No.	Title	Length
1.	"We Ride Tonight"	3:59
2.	"Some People"	4:36

== Charts ==
Chart (1982)	Peak position
US Mainstream Rock	26

== Cover versions ==
French duo Daft Punk sampled "We Ride Tonight" on the song "Contact" from the 2013 album Random Access Memories, which was a number one album in many countries.
