= Lose Yourself to Dance =

2013 single by Daft Punk featuring Pharrell Williams

Single by Daft Punk featuring Pharrell Williams

from the album Random Access Memories
- Released: 13 August 2013
- Recorded: 2012
- Genre: Disco; funk
- Length: 5:53 (album version); 4:09 (radio edit)
- Label: Columbia
- Songwriters: Thomas Bangalter; Guy-Manuel de Homem-Christo; Pharrell Williams; Nile Rodgers
- Producer: Daft Punk

Daft Punk singles chronology
"Get Lucky" (2013)	"Lose Yourself to Dance" (2013)	"Doin' It Right" (2013)

Pharrell Williams singles chronology
"Get Like Me" (2013)	"Lose Yourself to Dance" (2013)	"Happy" (2013)

Music video
- "Lose Yourself to Dance" on YouTube

"Lose Yourself to Dance" is a song by the French electronic music duo Daft Punk featuring American musician Pharrell Williams. "Lose Yourself to Dance" is the sixth track from the duo's fourth studio album, Random Access Memories (2013). Like with their previous collaboration on "Get Lucky", the song additionally features American guitarist Nile Rodgers.

The song was distributed to radio stations as the second single from the album on 13 August 2013, following "Get Lucky". Prior to this release, "Lose Yourself to Dance" charted in various countries, including France, Sweden, Switzerland and the United Kingdom. In the UK, it joined the playlists of BBC Radio 1, BBC Radio 2, and a number of commercial and smaller stations. It reached number 49 in the UK Singles Chart.

== Composition ==
"Lose Yourself to Dance"
"Lose Yourself to Dance" features live drumming, as opposed to digital instruments.

"Lose Yourself to Dance" is a disco and funk song in the key of B ♭ minor with a tempo of 100 BPM. Daft Punk expressed that the song was the result of a desire to create dance music with live drummers. Daft Punk member Thomas Bangalter elaborated that they wished to redefine dance music as "something lighter or something more [primal]", and that the song is meant to evoke the sense of being unified and connected on the dance floor.

Pharrell Williams sings lead vocals on "Lose Yourself to Dance". Williams stated that the song "makes me feel like walking down the street in the middle of the night in London and it's 1984, 1985. I don't hear '70s in that at all." He also believed that David Bowie could theoretically have sung the song. Additional vocals are performed by Daft Punk using vocoders, which Nick DeCosemo of Mixmag felt resembled their 2001 song "Harder, Better, Faster, Stronger" from their album Discovery.

Instrumentalists who perform on "Lose Yourself to Dance" include Nile Rodgers on guitar, Nathan East on bass, and John "J.R." Robinson on drums. Its "heavy beats" are said to resemble American rock singer Billy Squier's 1980 song "The Big Beat". Jeremy Abbott of Mixmag felt that, "Big multi-layered claps and thrashing cymbals also play a big part in driving the song forward."

In promotion of the 10th anniversary edition of the album, a video series called Memory Tapes was released throughout 2023. In Williams's episode, he revealed he did not expect his vocals to be on the finished versions of either song. The episode contains footage of Williams's reaction to the completed "Get Lucky" and "Lose Yourself to Dance" tracks for the first time.

One of the bonus tracks on the 10th anniversary edition is a demo without Rodgers called "LYTD (Vocoder Tests)".

== Promotion ==
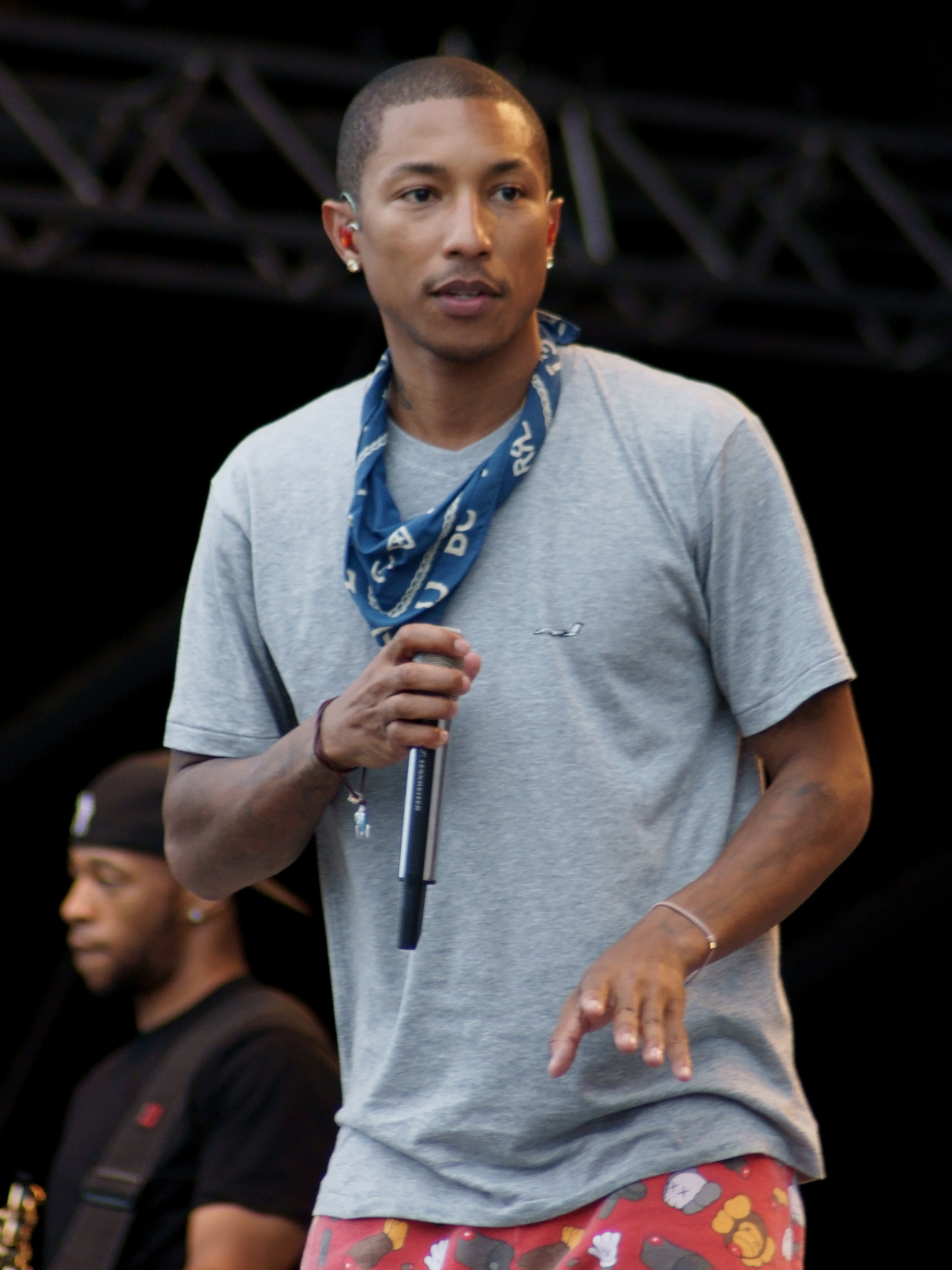
Pharrell Williams performed lead vocals for "Lose Yourself to Dance".

In the third episode of the promotional web series The Collaborators, Nile Rodgers performed a portion of "Lose Yourself to Dance", which was referred to only as "the song of the summer" by the interviewer. The title was later revealed through Columbia Records's official Vine account as part of a video relaying a series of images. A four-minute edit of the song was distributed to mainstream and rhythmic radio stations in the United States on 13 August 2013.

=== Music video ===
Rodgers stated that video footage had been shot for "Lose Yourself to Dance" at the same time that "Get Lucky" footage was being filmed. A trailer for "Lose Yourself to Dance" debuted at the 2013 MTV Video Music Awards, featuring Daft Punk, Rodgers and Williams, who also presented the award for "Best Female Video" at the ceremony. The song-length version of the video was released on Daft Punk's official Vevo channel on 16 September 2013. Produced by Daft Arts, the music video was shot on 70mm film and was directed by Daft Punk, Warren Fu, Paul Hahn and Cédric Hervet.

== Personnel ==
Credits adapted from Random Access Memories liner notes.

- Daft Punk – production, vocals
- Pharrell Williams – vocals
- Nile Rodgers – guitar
- Nathan East – bass
- John "J.R." Robinson – drums

== Track listing ==
Promotional CD

1. "Lose Yourself to Dance" (radio edit) – 4:09
2. "Lose Yourself to Dance" (album version) – 5:53

== Chart performance ==
=== Weekly charts ===
Weekly chart performance for "Lose Yourself to Dance"
Chart (2013–2014)	Peak position
Belgium (Ultratop 50 Flanders)	32
Belgium Dance (Ultratop Flanders)	5
Belgium Urban (Ultratop Flanders)	7
Belgium (Ultratop 50 Wallonia)	38
Belgium Dance (Ultratop Wallonia)	9
France (SNEP)	31
Iceland (Tónlist)	30
Italy (FIMI)	17
Ireland (IRMA)	62
Mexico (Billboard Mexican Airplay)	22
Mexico Anglo (Monitor Latino)	8
South Korea (Gaon International Chart)	1
Sweden (Sverigetopplistan)	42
Switzerland (Schweizer Hitparade)	59
UK Singles (Official Charts)	49
US Bubbling Under Hot 100 (Billboard)	3
US Hot Dance/Electronic Songs (Billboard)	10
US Dance Club Songs (Billboard)	1
US Rhythmic (Billboard)	35

=== Year-end charts ===
Annual chart rankings for "Lose Yourself to Dance"
Chart (2013)	Position
Belgium (Ultratop Flanders Dance)	40
Belgium (Ultratop Flanders Urban)	31
Belgium (Ultratop Wallonia Dance)	46
France (SNEP)	114
Italy (Musica e dischi)	95
South Korea (Gaon International Chart)	54
US Hot Dance/Electronic Songs (Billboard)	28
US Dance Club Songs (Billboard)	16

== Certifications ==
Region	Certification	Certified units/sales
Canada (Music Canada)	Platinum	80,000^{‡}
Italy (FIMI)	Gold	15,000^{‡}
Mexico (AMPROFON)	Gold	30,000^{*}
New Zealand (RMNZ)	Gold	15,000^{‡}
United Kingdom (BPI)	Silver	200,000^{‡}
United States (RIAA)	Platinum	1,000,000^{‡}
^{*} Sales figures based on certification alone.^{‡} Sales+streaming figures based on certification alone.

== Release history ==
Region	Date	Format	Label
United States	13 August 2013	Mainstream radio	Columbia
United States	13 August 2013	Rhythmic radio	Columbia
Italy	30 August 2013	Mainstream radio	Sony

== See also ==
- List of number-one dance singles of 2013 (U.S.)
