= Peter Franco =

- Born: 1973, November 27; Hollywood, California
- Occupations: Audio Engineer and Music Producer
- Years active: 2003-present
- Known for: Daft Punk's Album "Alive" in 2007
- Notable work: Assisted in production of Daft Punk's Album "Random Access Memories"
- Awards: Best Engineered Album, Non-Classical Best Dance/Electronica Album Album of the Year Record of the Year Best Electronic/Dance Album
- Website: www.pjfaudio.com

Peter Franco (November 27, 1973) is an audio engineer and music producer. Franco was first recognized for his work in 2007 on Daft Punk's Alive 2007 album. He recorded, and assisted in mixing Random Access Memories by Daft Punk in 2013. He has been one of four engineers for Daft Punk studio recordings since 2008.

== Early life ==
Born in Hollywood, Franco's love for music came spending time with his father in early life next to an electric organ in a suburban neighborhood of Los Angeles. Over time, his interest of music only grew as he listened to several artists throughout his childhood. From Stevie Wonder and Michael Jackson to Beastie Boys and The Police, the upbeat retro style was a common genre that Franco took into his works. He decided to go to college for music and gained plenty of experience making creations for friends and on his own before touring with artists such as Toto, Harry Belafonte, and eventually Daft Punk.

== Career ==
The first time Franco was acknowledged globally was in 2007 due to his participation in the production of Daft Punk's GRAMMY-Winning "Alive" album. Afterwards, things only escalated as he continued to work with Daft Punk, leading to even more successes. While making another project, Daft Punk's "Random Access Memories", Franco worked alongside Mick Guzauski, another engineer who helped produce albums of Daft Punk's inspirations. Trying to find the right sounds for Daft Punk's album was a crucial step in making the album, and so Peter and Mick used many tactics in the engineering process: keeping the snare mellow but still noticeable; experimenting with the low end of the equalizer giving a much warmer tone to drums; messing with different gear for the best tone and quality. These small details lead to the nomination of 3 GRAMMYS, as well as one song from the album, "Get Lucky" featuring Pharrell Williams, which would later be used in the Motion Picture Piece by Piece in 2024. As years went by, Peter Franco has worked on many more projects with artists like The Gama Sennin, Tycho, Justice, MexFutura, and Jamacia.

== Grammy Awards ==
Franco has won five Grammy Awards for his work as audio engineer on albums by Daft Punk:

- Best Engineered Album, Non-Classical for Random Access Memories
- Best Dance/Electronic Album for Random Access Memories
- Album of the Year for Random Access Memories
- Record of the Year for Get Lucky
- Best Electronic/Dance Album for Alive 2007

== Discography ==
Year	Album	Artist	Credits
2003	Intimate	Berlin	Audio Engineer
2005	Los Angeles, CA 10.28.05	Bauhaus	Front of House Engineer
2007	Alive 2007	Daft Punk	Audio Engineer
2010	I Think I Like U 2	Jamaica	Producer
2013	Random Access Memories	Daft Punk	Audio Engineer
2013	Get Lucky	Daft Punk	Audio Engineer
