= Random Access Memories =

2013 studio album by Daft Punk

Studio album by Daft Punk
- Released: 17 May 2013
- Recorded: 2008–2012
- Studios: Gang (Paris); Electric Lady (New York City); Henson (Los Angeles); Conway (Los Angeles); Capitol (Hollywood)
- Genres: Disco; funk; electronic; soft rock; progressive pop
- Length: 74:39
- Label: Columbia
- Producers: Thomas Bangalter; Guy-Manuel de Homem-Christo; Julian Casablancas; Todd Edwards; DJ Falcon

Daft Punk chronology
Tron: Legacy Reconfigured (2011)	Random Access Memories (2013)	Homework (Remixes) (2022)

Singles from Random Access Memories
- 1. "Get Lucky" Released: 19 April 2013; 2. "Lose Yourself to Dance" Released: 13 August 2013; 3. "Doin' It Right" Released: 3 September 2013; 4. "Instant Crush" Released: 22 November 2013; 5. "Give Life Back to Music" Released: 31 January 2014

Random Access Memories is the fourth and final studio album by the French electronic music duo Daft Punk. It was released on 17 May 2013 through Columbia Records. The album pays tribute to late 1970s and early 1980s American music, particularly from Los Angeles. This theme is reflected in the packaging and promotional campaign, which included billboards, television advertisements and a web series. Recording sessions took place from 2008 to 2012 at Henson, Conway and Capitol Studios in California, Electric Lady Studios in New York City, and Gang Recording Studio in Paris, France.

Following the minimal production of their previous album, Human After All (2005), Daft Punk recruited session musicians with the help of Chris Caswell to perform live instrumentation and limited the use of electronic instruments to drum machines, a custom-built modular synthesizer and vintage vocoders. It combines disco, progressive rock and pop, with contributions by Paul Jackson Jr., Giorgio Moroder, Chilly Gonzales, Julian Casablancas, Paul Williams, Caswell, Pharrell Williams, Nile Rodgers, Todd Edwards, Panda Bear and DJ Falcon.

Random Access Memories is the only Daft Punk album to top the US Billboard 200, and was certified platinum by the Recording Industry Association of America. It also topped the charts in twenty other countries. Its lead single, "Get Lucky", topped the charts in more than 30 countries and became one of the best-selling digital singles of all time. The album appeared on several year-end lists, and won in several categories at the 2014 Grammy Awards, including Album of the Year, Best Dance/Electronica Album, and Best Engineered Album, Non-Classical. "Get Lucky" also won the awards for Record of the Year and Best Pop Duo/Group Performance. In 2020, Rolling Stone ranked Random Access Memories number 295 on their list of the "500 Greatest Albums of All Time".

== Background ==
In 2008, after finishing their Alive 2006/2007 tour, Daft Punk began working on new material in Paris, recording demos for approximately six months. They were pleased with the compositions, but dissatisfied with their process of sampling and looping, as they had done for their previous albums. As Thomas Bangalter of Daft Punk stated, "We could play some riffs and stuff but not keep it [up] for four minutes straight." Daft Punk put these demos aside and started work on the Tron: Legacy film soundtrack, which Bangalter described as "very humbling". For their next album, Daft Punk decided to work extensively with live musicians. They spoke with Chris Caswell, a well-connected musician in the industry who had previously composed arrangements for Legacy, and commissioned him to gather a group of experienced session artists to perform for the record. According to Bangalter, "We wanted to do what we used to do with machines and samplers, but with people." They avoided the use of samples, with the exception of the closing track "Contact".

The idea was really having this desire for live drums, as well as questioning, really, why and what is the magic in samples? [...] It occurred to us it’s probably a collection of so many different parameters; of amazing performances, the studio, the place it was recorded, the performers, the craft, the hardware, recording engineers, mixing engineers, the whole production process of these records that took a lot of effort and time to make back then.

— Thomas Bangalter, regarding the album's conception

The album features Chic frontman Nile Rodgers. According to Rodgers, the collaboration was "something we've talked about for a long time. We've respected each other endlessly." Daft Punk visited Rodgers' home for an informal jam session. Musician Paul Williams announced in a 2010 interview that he had worked with the group, after Daft Punk had been introduced to Williams by a sound engineer with whom they were mutually acquainted.

In May 2012, Daft Punk's collaboration with Giorgio Moroder was announced. Moroder had recorded a monologue about his life for use in a track on the album. Rodgers was also present during the Moroder recording session. Moroder clarified that he was not involved in the composition of the track or its use of a synthesizer: "They did not let me get involved at all. Thomas asked me if I wanted to tell the story of my life. Then they would know what to do with it." Daft Punk had been in contact with Moroder in relation to a possible contribution for the Tron: Legacy score, but this never happened.

Chilly Gonzales stated in an interview that his contribution was recorded in a one-day session: "I played for hours and they're gonna grab what they grab and turn it into whatever." He explained that Daft Punk prompted him at the piano in the same manner that a film director coaches an actor, and Gonzales left the Los Angeles studio without knowledge of what the final product would sound like. He had previously recorded a cover version of Daft Punk's song "Too Long" that appeared on their 2003 album Daft Club.

Pharrell Williams collaborated with Daft Punk and Rodgers by providing vocals for two tracks on Random Access Memories. As a member of the Neptunes, Pharrell had previously provided a remix of "Harder, Better, Faster, Stronger" that appeared on Daft Club. The Neptunes and Daft Punk also co-produced N.E.R.D.'s song "Hypnotize U".

== Recording ==
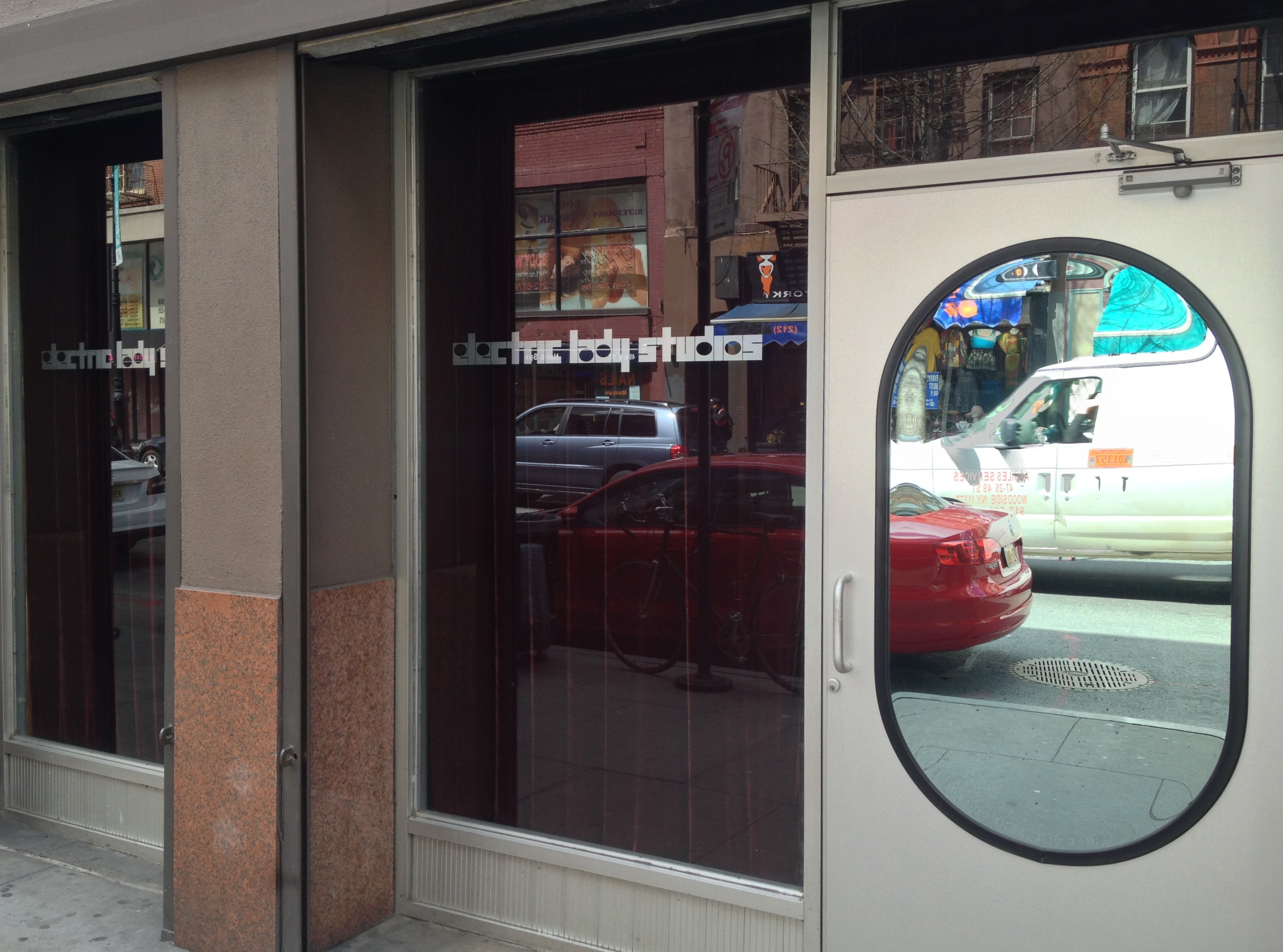
Electric Lady Studios, one of the five studios where the album was recorded

Daft Punk recorded Random Access Memories in secrecy. Recording took place at Henson Recording Studios, Conway Recording Studios and Capitol Studios in California, Electric Lady Studios in New York City, and Gang Recording Studio in Paris. Having worked with keyboardist and arranger Chris Caswell on Tron: Legacy, Daft Punk enlisted him and connected with engineers and other session players. They wanted to avoid the more compressed sounds of drum machines in favor of "airy open" drum sets of the 1970s and 80s, which they considered the most appealing era of music. They said the session players were enthusiastic about reuniting in the context of the new album and the prestige of the studio locations.

Drummer Omar Hakim recalled being asked by Daft Punk to perform on the album, and was surprised by what they wanted of him. He at first assumed they wanted electronic drum work, since Hakim had done some drum programming in his career. Daft Punk instead specified that they were looking to record Hakim performing drum riffs that they had conceived. Rather than play out the entire structure of a song, Hakim would perform individual patterns for extended periods, creating a library for Daft Punk to cull from. They conveyed their ideas to session musicians via sheet music and in some instances by humming melodies. For example, Bangalter hummed a complex drum and bass line to Hakim, who replicated and improved upon it for "Giorgio by Moroder".

Most of the vocal sessions took place in Paris, whereas the rhythm sections were recorded in the United States. The album incorporates a variety of accompanying performances including a horn section, woodwind instruments, a string orchestra and choir. Orchestral parts were recorded for almost every track, but used for only a few on the completed album. Bangalter said that the use of such performers and studios for the sake of experimentation harkened to an earlier era, and came at great monetary expense. He estimated that it had cost more than one million dollars, but felt that the number was not important. The sessions were financed by Daft Punk themselves, which allowed them the luxury of abandoning the project if they wished. Bangalter said some songs had been recorded across five studios over two and a half years. Rodgers recalled that Daft Punk aimed to create an album as if the Internet had never existed.

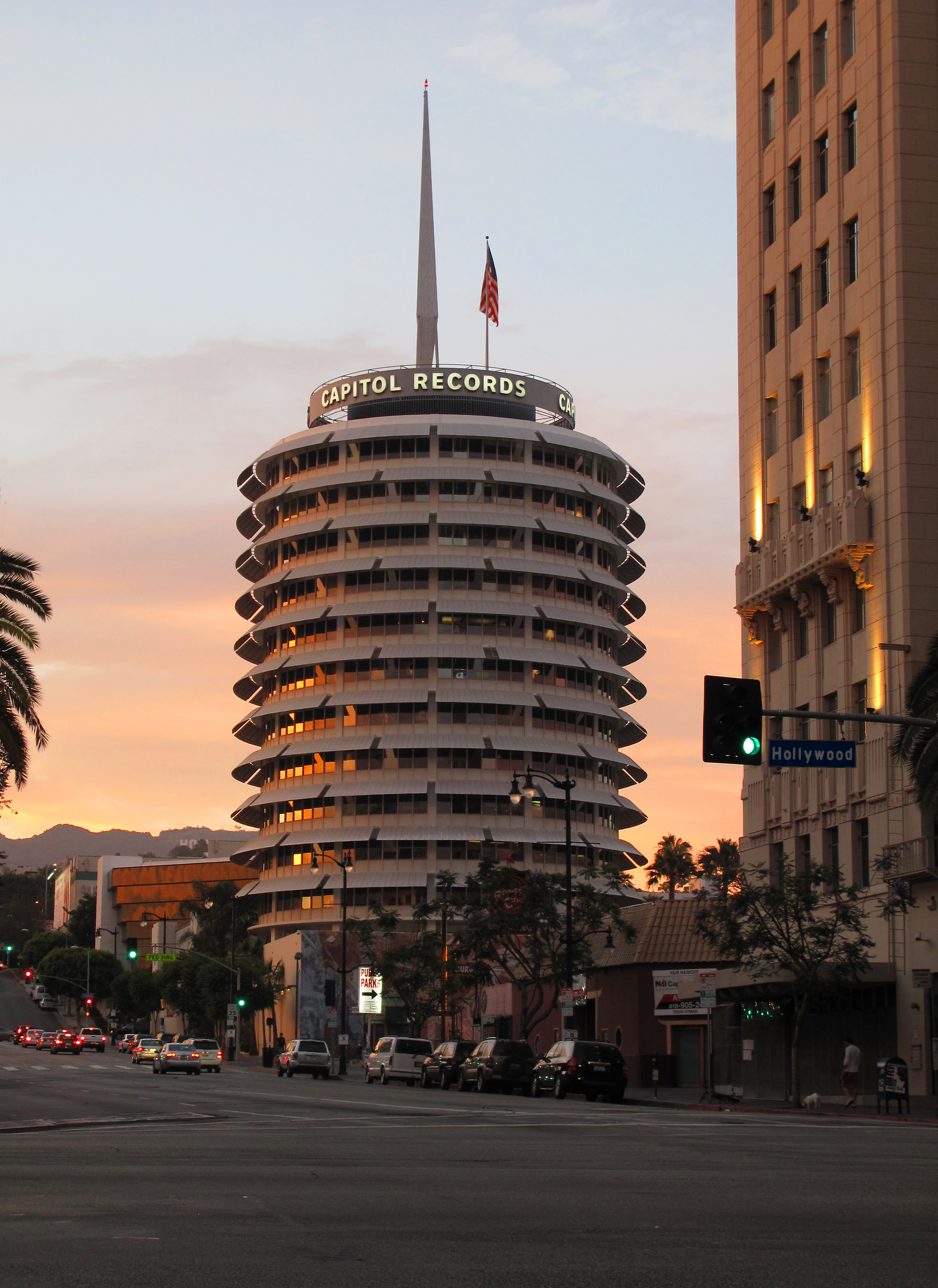
The album was recorded in Los Angeles studios including Capitol Studios.

Various sound effects were newly recorded with the help of film experts from Warner Bros. Bangalter noted one example in which the sound of a busy restaurant was achieved by placing microphones in front of the forks of a group of people. In another instance, the effect of dripping water was recorded on a soundstage. Use of electronics was limited to drum machines that appear on only two tracks, a large custom-built Modcan modular synthesizer performed live by Daft Punk, and vintage vocoders. When asked which Daft Punk member performed the robotic vocals, Bangalter said it did not matter. Daft Punk produced most of the vocoder tracks in their studio in Paris, with later processing by Mick Guzauski at Capitol. Moroder elaborated that Daft Punk would take "a week or so" to find an adequate vocoder sound, and an additional few days to record the lyrics.

Although Daft Punk felt that the presets and parameters of digital tools would inhibit creativity and innovation, they said Random Access Memories could not have been made without computer technology. The sessions were recorded simultaneously onto Ampex reels and as Pro Tools tracks; Daft Punk and Guzauski would then listen to each recording in both analogue and digital iterations, deciding which of the two they preferred. Subsequently, the elements were edited by Daft Punk with Pro Tools in a manner similar to how they would work with samples.

In an interview with Guitar World in November 2012, the Fourplay member Nathan East said he had contributed to the project. Pedal steel guitar was performed by Greg Leisz. Daft Punk sought to use it in a way that bordered between electronic and acoustic. Additional session players included John "J.R." Robinson, Paul Jackson, Jr., James Genus and Thomas Bloch.

== Music ==
=== Theme and influences ===
Bangalter said the title encapsulates Daft Punk's interest in the past, referencing both random-access memory technology and the human experience: "We were drawing a parallel between the brain and the hard drive–the random way that memories are stored." Daft Punk felt that while current technology allows for an unlimited capacity to store recorded material, the content produced by contemporary artists had diminished in quality. Their goal was to maximize the potential of infinite storage by recording a sprawling amount of elements. They connected this to the title, as they sought to make connections out of the random series of ideas.

Random Access Memories was described by music critics as a disco album. Daft Punk sought a "west coast vibe", referencing such acts as Fleetwood Mac, the Doobie Brothers and the Eagles. The record pays homage to Michael Jackson, the Cars, and Steely Dan. The recording of live synthesizers was inspired by progressive rock, with the pop sensibilities of Wizzard and the Move. Daft Punk looked to Rumours by Fleetwood Mac and The Dark Side of the Moon by Pink Floyd as models. Bangalter said "the most important records in music, whether it's Led Zeppelin [...] or The White Album or Sgt. Pepper's... or Quadrophenia or Tommy, are the ones that take you on a journey for miles and miles."

=== Composition ===
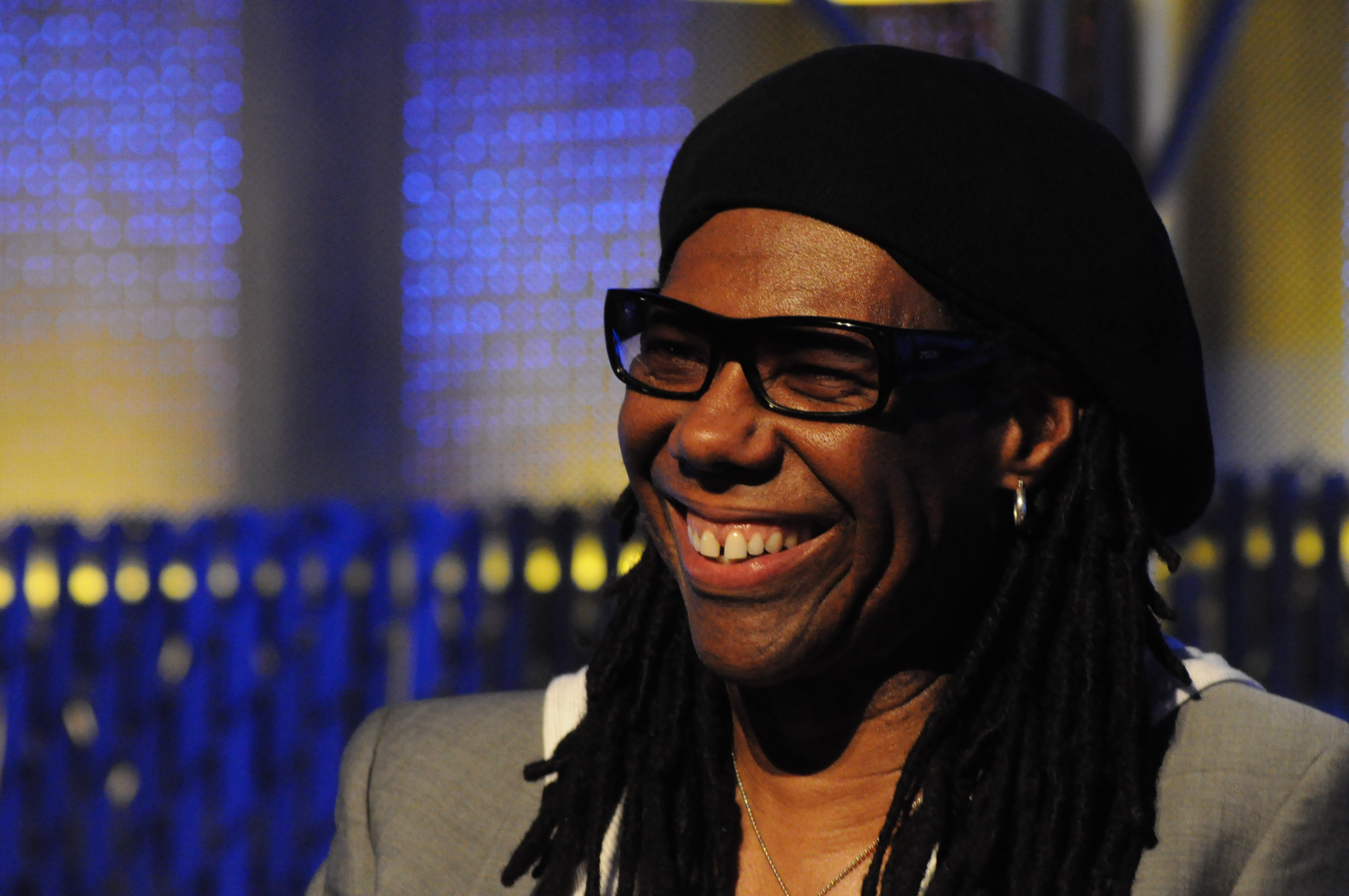
Nile Rodgers appears on three songs, including the lead single, "Get Lucky".

Daft Punk created demos for Random Access Memories without a clear plan for an album. Over the course of the sessions, numerous tracks were created and discarded. At one point Daft Punk considered sorting the album into one continuous track, similar to the Prince record Lovesexy. They also considered releasing it as a four-disc box set to accommodate the volume of content. The album lacked structure until the final months of production.

The opening track, "Give Life Back to Music", features guitar by Rodgers and Paul Jackson, Jr., keyboards by Chilly Gonzales, drums by John "J.R." Robinson, and vocals performed by Daft Punk using vocoders. The song reflects Daft Punk's goal to create a light yet polished and elegant record. According to NME, it begins with "a stupendously vast rock intro that obliterates any trace of Human After All's brittle techno". The following track, "The Game of Love", also features vocoded vocals. Bangalter said, "There's this thing today where the recorded human voice is processed to try to feel robotic." Their intent was to produce robotic vocals with expressiveness and emotion. "Giorgio by Moroder" was created as a metaphor about musical freedom, with Moroder's monologue about his career as analogue for music's history regarding exploration of genres and tastes. Moroder was not involved in the composition, and said that after he recorded the story of his life "they would know what to do with it". In the monologue, Moroder details the creative process behind Donna Summer's I Remember Yesterday (1977) and its closing track "I Feel Love".

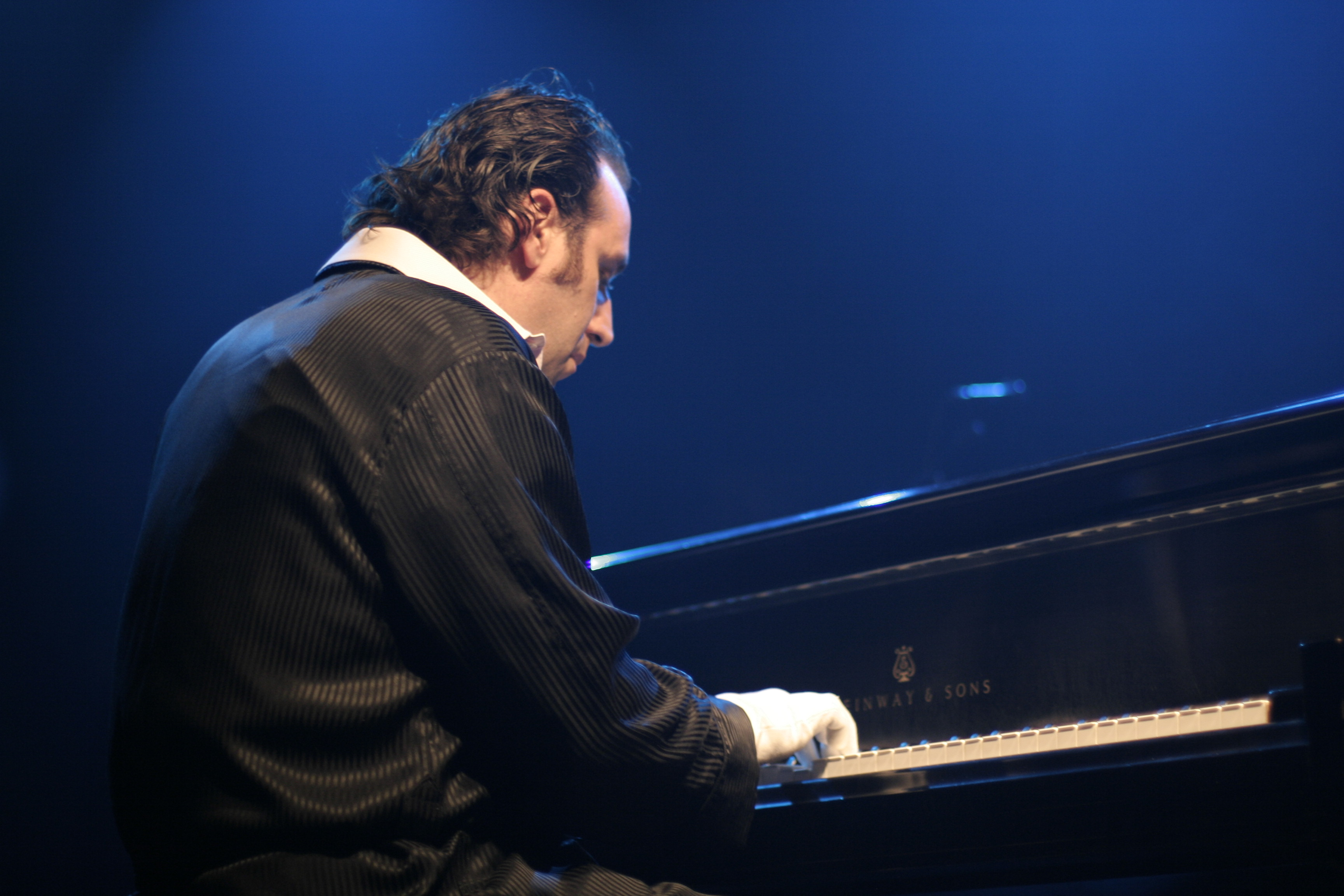
Chilly Gonzales was tasked with creating a transition on "Within" that would modulate to the key of subsequent tracks.

"Within" was one of the first tracks recorded. It features Gonzales on piano with minimal accompaniment of bass, percussion, electric keyboard, and vocoder. "Within" transitions from the key of A minor of the previous three songs to the key of B-flat minor of subsequent tracks. Regarding the lyrics, the critic Nick Stevenson wrote, "A deep vocoder sings about not understanding the world, being lost and not even remembering his own name." Jeremy Abbott of Mixmag wrote: "So many things I don't understand is the prominent lyric and Chilly's chords combined with grazing cymbals make for a beautiful summer lullaby."

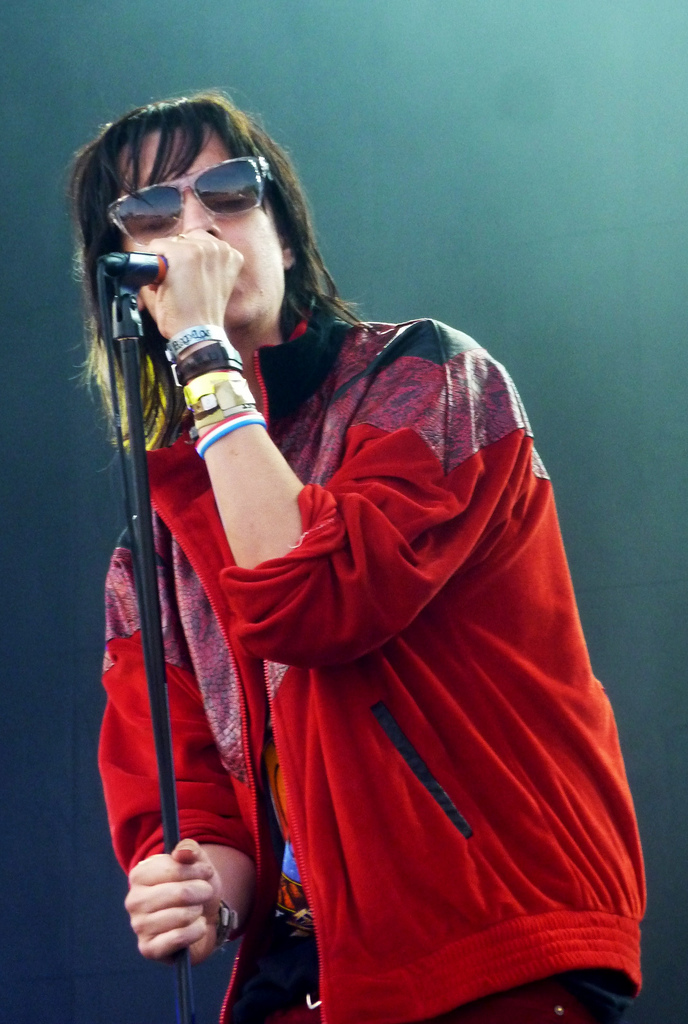
The Strokes singer Julian Casablancas appears on "Instant Crush".

"Instant Crush" was based on a demo that Daft Punk presented to the Strokes singer Julian Casablancas; he became enthused upon hearing it and provided vocals. The song contains rock influences and a guitar solo. Casablancas noted that he ultimately combined the compositions of two separate Daft Punk demos, which serve as the verse and chorus respectively. The critic John Balfe considered the song "appropriately Strokes-ish, even if [Casablancas'] trademark drawl is fed quite substantially through a vocoder". De Homem-Christo said: "It is true that it is not his usual register, it is the way Julian reacted to the track so for us it is even more exciting." "Lose Yourself to Dance", featuring Pharrell Williams, was the result of a desire to create dance music with live drummers. Robinson appears as session player. A vocoder chant of "come on" appears alongside Williams's singing.

"Touch" features lyrics and vocals by Paul Williams. Daft Punk said it was the most complex piece, comprising more than 250 different elements. It was composed with Williams's frequent collaborator Chris Caswell, who arranged a counter-melody for the string accompaniment. As Pitchfork observed, "the song warps and bends, floating through genres, epochs, and emotions with a sense of hallucinatory wonder" and recalls the Beatles song "A Day in the Life". In Rolling Stone, Will Hermes wrote: "It's completely ridiculous. It's also remarkably beautiful and affecting." Louis Lepron of Kombini saw the multitude of styles and science fiction aesthetics as a homage to musical films including Phantom of the Paradise, the soundtrack of which Williams had composed. The opening references a scene in the film in which the title character's voice is gradually enhanced in a studio booth. De Homem-Christo said "Touch" is "like the core of the record, and the memories of the other tracks are revolving around it".

"Get Lucky" features more vocals from Pharrell Williams. Williams said the title phrase did not refer simply to sex, but also the potential of finding chemistry with another person. When he first heard the song, Williams said it evoked the image of a "peachy color[ed]" sunrise on an exotic island. Daft Punk discussed the concept of the song "Beyond" with Paul Williams, who translated the ideas into lyrics. It begins with an orchestral string section and timpani before settling into what NME called "reupholstered Warren G 'Regulate' grooves". Stevenson described "Beyond" as "a lot like the sample used in Nate Dogg and Warren G's ‘Regulate’", Michael McDonald's song "I Keep Forgettin'", which he said was "no bad thing". He said the vocoded lyrics detail "the existential world beyond oceans and mountains – a land beyond love".

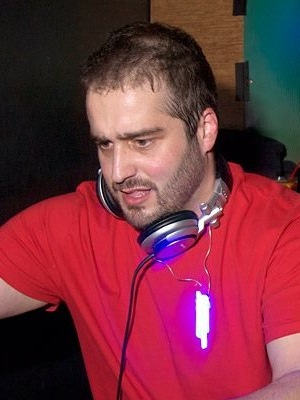
Todd Edwards's contribution to "Fragments of Time" added electronic elements to the initially contemporary song.

Daft Punk described "Motherboard" as a "futuristic composition that could be from the year 4000". One critic, Louis Lepron observed its similarity to the style of Sébastien Tellier. Todd Edwards said the lyrics of "Fragments of Time" were inspired by his desire to capture the moments and emotions he experienced during the recording sessions in California. At Daft Punk's request, he implemented his signature "cut-up" method of production into a portion of the song, which they used as the chorus. Bangalter felt this contribution "helped save" the track, as Daft Punk had felt the more "contemporary-sounding" song was lacking in electronic elements. "Doin' It Right" was the last song recorded, and features vocals by Noah Lennox, known professionally as Panda Bear. Initiated by Lennox's desire to collaborate with Daft Punk, the song was recorded over a span of four days. Lennox said he wanted to create a song that was neither Panda Bear nor Daft Punk and "hit a target that was perfectly in the middle of us". Daft Punk referred to it as the only purely electronic track, with a modern style.

Eugene Cernan describes a "Bright Object"
"Contact" features a recording from the Apollo 17 mission, where astronaut Eugene Cernan observes a "Bright object" from a window of his capsule.

The closing track, "Contact", was co-produced by DJ Falcon. It features a sample of the song "We Ride Tonight" by the Australian rock band the Sherbs, which Bangalter and Falcon had sampled as Together during a DJ set at a 2002 show in Amsterdam. It incorporates a NASA excerpt from the Apollo 17 mission, in which Eugene Cernan observes a flashing object from a window of his capsule. Falcon, who played modular synthesizer on the track, said the studio speakers blew out when they played the completed version. The Japan-exclusive bonus track "Horizon" is a slow-tempo composition reminiscent of Pink Floyd. It features a consistent guitar strum while additional instruments are progressively layered over, including bass guitar and drums. The song is stylistically different from other tracks, and is one of the few to feature no vocals.

== Promotion and release ==
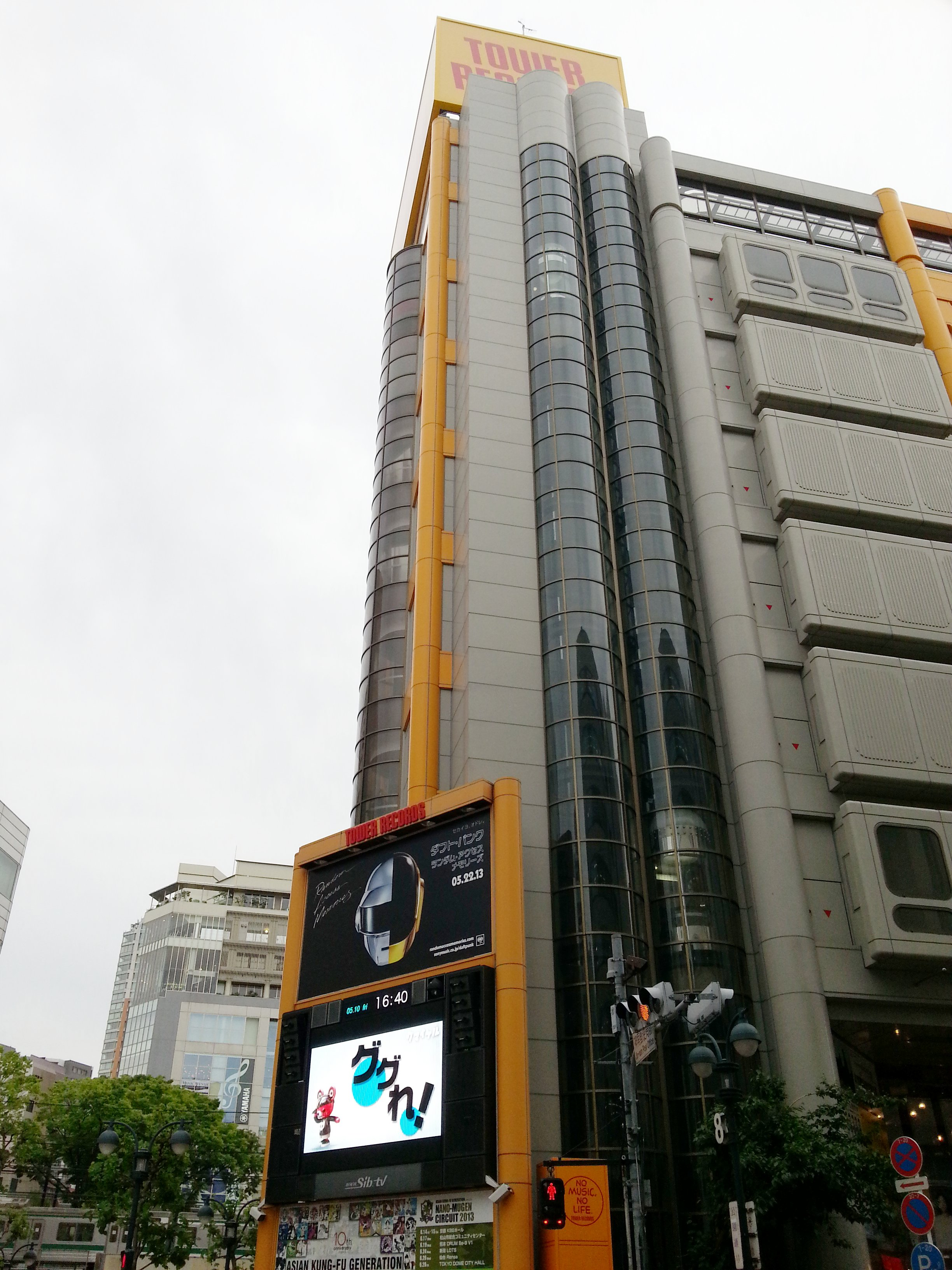
Billboard at Tower Records Shibuya promoting Random Access Memories in May 2013

In January 2013, de Homem-Christo revealed that Daft Punk were in the process of signing with Sony Music Entertainment through the Columbia Records label, and that the album would be released in early 2013. A report from The Guardian followed specifying a release date of May 2013. On 26 February 2013, Daft Punk's official website and Facebook page announced the signing to Columbia with a picture of their helmets and a Columbia logo. Billboards and posters featuring the helmets and logo then appeared in several major cities.

On 2 March, a 15-second television ad aired during Saturday Night Live (SNL) depicting an animated, stylized version of the band's logo and the aforementioned image of the helmets. The music featured in the ad was a result of the collaboration with Rodgers, who noted that various fan remixes of the clip appeared online after the airing. A second TV ad also premiered that was similar to the first on Saturday Night Live, but with a different music clip and the title Random Access Memories in place of the stylized Daft Punk logo. During the first night of Coachella Festival 2013, a third trailer debuted that featured Daft Punk, Pharrell Williams and Rodgers performing, as well as a list of collaborators. The trailer also aired during Saturday Night Live the following evening, but without a list of collaborators.

The gradual rollout of promotion was inspired by advertising of the past, reflecting the theme of the album. Daft Punk approached Columbia with a specific agenda for the campaign; Rob Stringer of the label recalled Daft Punk showing him the book Rock 'n' Roll Billboards of the Sunset Strip as an example of what they wanted. Bangalter felt that physical billboards are more affecting than banner ads and that "SNL is this part of American culture with a certain timelessness to it." The campaign was handled by a small group led by Daft Punk and manager Paul Hahn, with assistance from Kathryn Frazier of the public-relations firm Biz 3. The duo had pursued Columbia in particular because of its long-standing history, as expressed by Bangalter: "It felt interesting conceptually to write this story with a record company like Columbia, with a 125-year legacy."

Central to the promotion was the limiting of exposure to the album's content, as well as a focus on face-to-face contact for press previews. As Hahn stated, "There is a minimalism in our approach that creates an absence of information, and we notice our fans tend to throw themselves into the breach, or try to fill the empty spaces." Following a reported leak of the song days earlier, "Get Lucky" was released as a download single on 19 April 2013. On 13 May, a limited-time preview stream of the full album was launched via the iTunes Store. In May 2013, Random Access Memories was released on digital storefronts and streaming services.

Daft Punk were scheduled to appear on 6 August episode of The Colbert Report to promote Random Access Memories, but were unable because of conflicting obligations regarding their future appearance at the 2013 MTV Video Music Awards. According to Stephen Colbert, Daft Punk were unaware of any exclusivity agreement and were halted by MTV executives the morning prior to the taping. Colbert nevertheless broadcast an elaborate sketch of himself dancing to "Get Lucky" with various celebrities, including Hugh Laurie, Jeff Bridges, Jimmy Fallon, Bryan Cranston, Jon Stewart, Henry Kissinger, Matt Damon, and the Rockettes.

=== Artwork packaging ===
Unlike the previous studio albums that feature the band's wordmark as the cover art, Random Access Memories is the first and only one to not do so. Instead, it features the band members' signature helmets with the album title written on the top left. The title treatment is reminiscent to that of Michael Jackson's Thriller. The image of the helmets was first revealed on Daft Punk's website, and became a recurring symbol throughout the promotional campaign.

The track titles were initially withheld from online retailers and later revealed through Columbia's Vine account on 16 April 2013, as a video relaying a series of images from the back cover of the record. On 13 May, Daft Punk's official Vevo channel posted a video revealing the artwork packaging of the vinyl version of the album, as well as the first few seconds of the opening track. Disc labels of the album feature the classic yellow and red Columbia design used on records during the 1970s and '80s, reflecting the album's theme.

Columbia released a deluxe box set of Random Access Memories containing a 56-page hardcover book, the vinyl edition, a partial 70 mm film strip of the "Lose Yourself to Dance" video, and triangle-designed gold and silver plated USB drives, which contain standard and bonus audio as well as video content, respectively.

=== The Collaborators ===
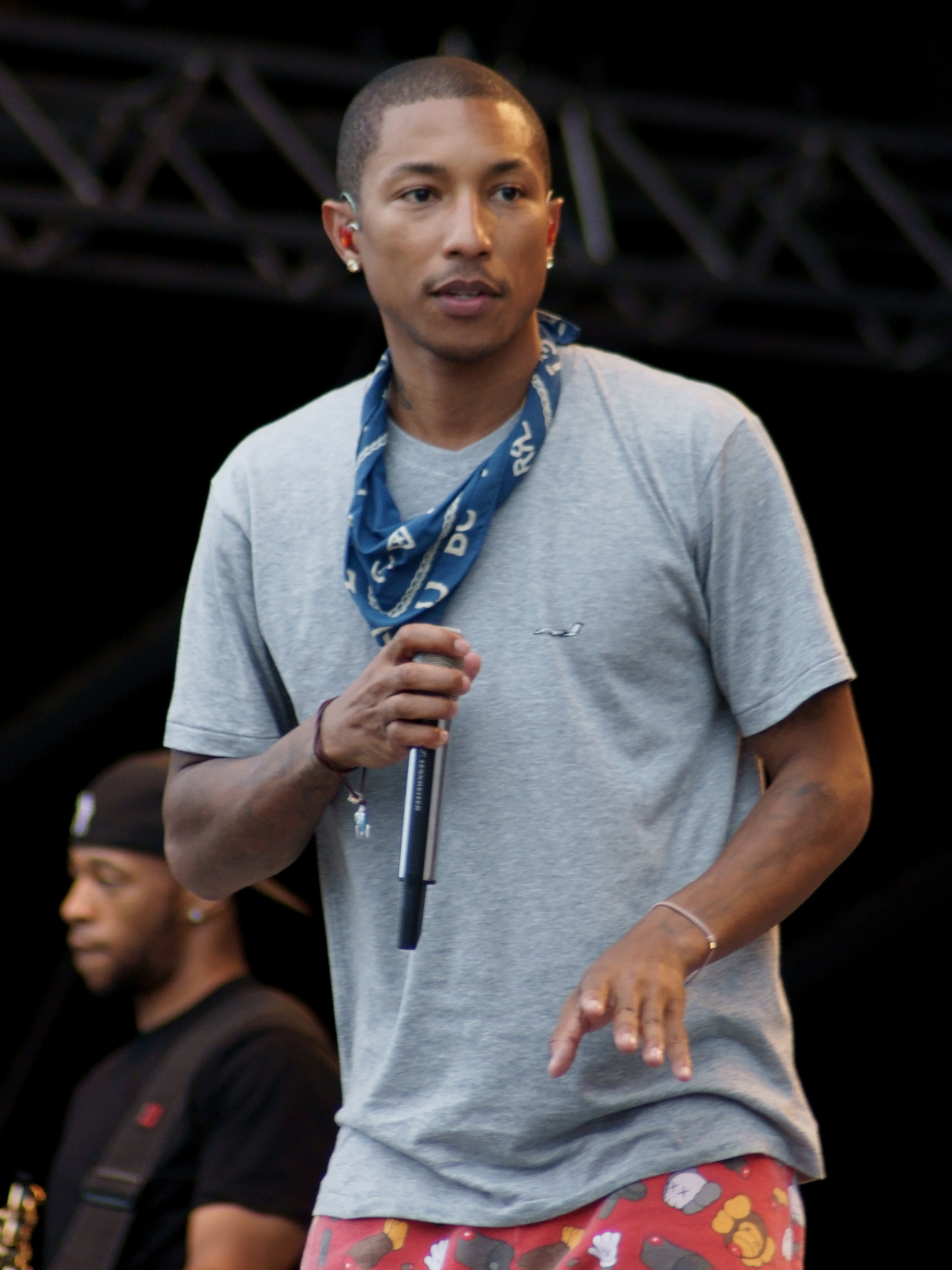
Excerpts of the lead single, "Get Lucky", featuring Pharrell Williams, appear in The Collaborators.

A video series called The Collaborators, directed by Ed Lachman and produced by The Creators Project, a partnership between Intel and Vice, was featured on Daft Punk's Random Access Memories website. Eight episodes were released in the series, which features interviews with participating musicians. The episodes were released weekly leading up to the album's launch. All featured album artists appear in the series with the exception of Casablancas, who would go on to appear prominently in the music video for "Instant Crush". Excerpts of the lead single "Get Lucky" appear in the opening and ending of each Collaborators episode as well as excerpts of other songs from the album, corresponding to each featured musician.

The first episode features disco pioneer Moroder speaking about his experiences with the genre such as his records with Donna Summer and experimenting with synthesizers. Moroder also talks about his visit with Daft Punk in their recording studio. The first Daft Punk track he heard was "One More Time" (2000), and especially liked the breakdown middle section. He concluded Daft Punk were "perfectionists" and described the album as "something [...] different. Still dance, still electronic; but [they] give that human touch back."

Episode two revealed that Edwards had contributed to the album; he said it was difficult keeping his involvement a secret. Edwards had previously collaborated with Daft Punk to create the song "Face to Face" on the 2001 album Discovery. He summarized his experience in the studio recording "Fragments of Time" as being life-changing, as the sessions inspired him to move from New Jersey to California on a permanent basis. Edwards also pointed out the irony of "two androids [...] bringing soul back to music".

The third episode features Rodgers, who spoke of his background as a founding member of Chic, as well as his numerous collaborations with other artists throughout his career, such as David Bowie, Madonna, and Duran Duran. He expressed that working with Daft Punk "[felt] like [...] working with contemporaries" and that they motivated each other to excel when collaborating. Rodgers played a portion of "Lose Yourself to Dance", and said Daft Punk had evolved while exploring music's past, suggesting that "they went back to go forward".

Pharrell Williams participated in the fourth episode. He discussed the organic sound of the album, saying it "feels like the only click track they had was [...] the human heartbeat". He felt that the record can be enjoyed by people of all ages due to the accessible nature of music, and concluded that Daft Punk "could just get back on the spaceship that brought them here and go, and leave us. But they're gracious, they're nice robots. They chose to stay".

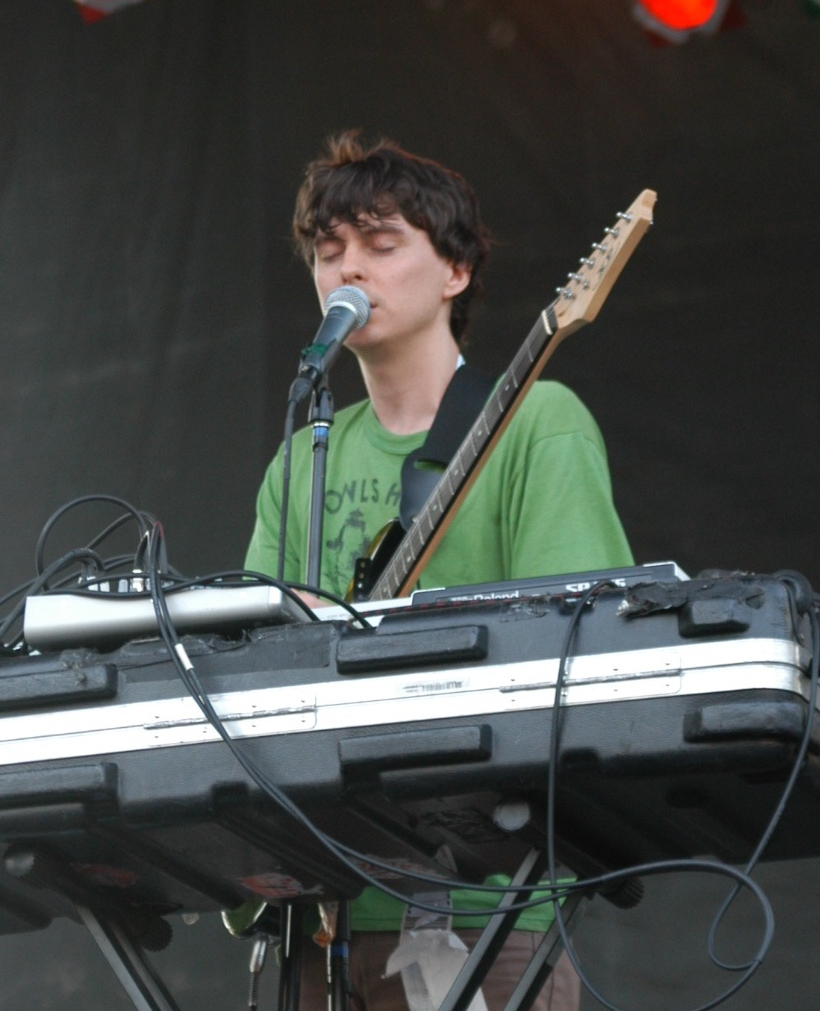
Panda Bear of Animal Collective sang on "Doin' It Right".

Episode five features Noah Lennox, better known by his stage name Panda Bear, who spoke about his contribution and his history with the band Animal Collective. He first heard of Daft Punk through the music video of the song "Around the World", which introduced him to many aspects of electronic dance music. He added that Homework was one of the few albums he and his older brother both enjoyed. Regarding Random Access Memories, Lennox remarked upon the approach of having live musicians, but structuring their performances in a minimal, sample-like fashion.

For the sixth episode, Gonzales recalled Daft Punk's joy listening to the raw session recordings made early in the production, and said it took years to finish the album. He said Daft Punk were aware of how the keys of each song would contribute to the emotional progression of the album as a whole. He therefore performed the piano in the song "Within" to accommodate the cycle. Gonzales concluded by pointing out that Daft Punk rarely collaborate with others, and thus felt that they did so on Random Access Memories to "make the work be transcendent".

The seventh episode features Stéphane Quême, otherwise known as DJ Falcon, who spoke of first meeting Daft Punk when they began recording their debut album Homework. Quême noted that their sound had since changed and that each of their albums drew from different influences. He felt producers would be able to sample Random Access Memories in the same way Daft Punk had sampled older records in their previous albums.

Episode eight features Paul Williams, who likened Daft Punk's personas to a character from the film Phantom of the Paradise, in which he starred. He also added that their masks hide who they are from the public and allow the listeners to enjoy the music for what it is. Paul Williams worked at Henson Recording Studios, the former studio of A&M Records where he had worked previously, including his compositions for Jim Henson's films featuring the Muppets, such as "Rainbow Connection". He also stated that the song he penned was to be sung from the point of view of an unidentified first person, setting the emotion, but the lyrics came from the music itself. Paul Williams said that he felt vulnerable while writing the record, and said he writes best when he is allowed to be honest and vulnerable, a situation that Daft Punk nurtured. He also stated that his sobriety added a sense of wonder to the song he wrote, as every day for him being sober has been wonderful compared to his prior life of excess.

=== Global album launch ===
The 79th Annual Wee Waa Show, held on 17 May 2013 in the rural Australian town of Wee Waa, was selected as the venue for the worldwide album launch. The tickets for the Wee Waa album launch were completely sold within thirteen minutes of release, even though it was widely understood that Daft Punk would not be in attendance at the launch. The launch details revealed that the album would be streamed live to the 4,000 audience members.

Sony commissioned the design and construction of a custom-built stage for the Wee Waa album launch event, and the Daft Arts production house assembled a LED circular music space that became Australia's biggest-ever outdoor dance floor. The record label described the creation, which was illuminated by a giant disco ball and complemented by four speaker towers and flood lights, as "Saturday Night Fever meets Close Encounters of the Third Kind". The prelude to the streaming was a pyrotechnic show provided by Father Anthony Koppman and his company "Holy Smoke" from Guyra, New South Wales.

=== Re-releases ===
On 22 February 2023, Daft Punk announced that a 10th-anniversary edition of Random Access Memories would be released on 12 May. It has an extra disc of 35 minutes of bonus content, including unreleased demos and outtakes. It includes the version of "Touch" used in the video announcing Daft Punk's disbandment. A Dolby Atmos version of the reissue was also released. The reissue contained the single, "Infinity Repeating (2013 Demo)", featuring Julian Casablancas and the Voidz. Casablancas discussed the song in interviews in 2014. Daft Punk called the track their "last song ever" in its press release. The reissue reached number one on the Billboard Dance/Electronic Albums chart and the top 10 on the Billboard 200.

Random Access Memories (Drumless Edition) was released on 17 November 2023. It includes the original 13 album tracks without drums. The re-release received lukewarm reviews, with Ben Cardew of Pitchfork writing that while some songs sound "bereft of life," the more orchestral songs "feel flush with vivid color." Jason Heffler of EDM.com gave Random Access Memories (Drumless Edition) a positive review, praising its "kaleidoscopic warmth".

== Critical reception ==
Professional ratings
Aggregate scores
Source	Rating
AnyDecentMusic?	7.9/10
Metacritic	87/100
Review scores
Source	Rating
AllMusic	5/5 stars
The A.V. Club	B+
The Daily Telegraph	5/5 stars
Entertainment Weekly	A
The Guardian	4/5 stars
The Independent	4/5 stars
NME	10/10
Pitchfork	8.8/10
Rolling Stone	4/5 stars
Spin	8/10

At Metacritic, which assigns a weighted mean rating out of 100 to reviews from mainstream critics, Random Access Memories has an average score of 87 based on 47 reviews, indicating "universal acclaim". It has the highest Metacritic score of any Daft Punk album. Q called it "by some margin Daft Punk's best album in a career that's already redefined dance music at least twice. It is, in short, a mind blower." The Independent stated, "Random Access Memories breathes life into the safe music that dominates today's charts, with its sheer ambition ... It's an exciting journey, and one that, for all its musical twists and turns, has its feet planted on the dancefloor." Melissa Maerz of Entertainment Weekly called it "a headphones album in an age of radio singles; a bravura live performance that stands out against pro forma knob-twiddling; a jazzy disco attack on the basic house beat; a full collaboration at a time when the superstar DJ stands alone." She concluded her review by saying that "if EDM is turning humans into robots, Daft Punk are working hard to make robot pop feel human again."

Several critics commented on the variety of content. NME said, "There's a creeping notion that every musical idea that's ever been so much as thought up is on this album." In addition, Random Access Memories is ranked No. 497 on NME's list, "The 500 Greatest Albums Of All Time". Mark Richardson of Pitchfork echoed this sentiment, calling the record "a mix of disco, soft rock, and prog-pop, along with some Broadway-style pop bombast and even a few pinches of their squelching stadium-dance aesthetic". Richardson praised the engineering and recording, but found that "though everything about RAM, from the session musicians to the guests to the means of production, is meant to sound more 'human,' the album at points sounds more sterile, almost too perfect." Pitchfork named the album the seventh-best of 2013.

DJ Magazine commented on the shift in Daft Punk's musical style: "While Daft Punk clearly want to move on and evolve, ditching the electronic beats, house and techno that first elevated them to fame, it's that music that forms the bedrock of their best tunes, and still, that's what they're best at making." Resident Advisor stated that "it's an album rooted in a now-ancient aesthetic", noting the influence of music born out of California and New York in the 1970s. In a five-star review, Heather Phares of AllMusic said that the record "taps into the wonder and excitement" of music from the 1970s and early 1980s. Phares concluded her review by saying, "Random Access Memories is also Daft Punk's most personal work, and richly rewarding for listeners willing to spend time with it."

Aaron Payne of musicOMH wrote, "Daft Punk somehow misplace the wit and the light touch that's pretty much their trademark. Instead, these long epics become somewhat tedious and there is a strong whiff of egoism and self-indulgence ... At over 70 minutes, the album feels rather bloated. Quite a few of the songs are too long, or too empty of ideas, or too willing to repeat themselves, or too willing to play to type". Dan Weiss of Paste noted that "none of the admittedly eclectic pilferings of Random Access Memories challenge or defy anything. They all evoke specific eras of film soundtrack or disco trend. The beats have grown less, not more, complex over time."

=== Retrospective reviews ===
In January 2015, Random Access Memories was placed at number 9 on Billboard's list of "The 20 Best Albums of 2010s (so far)". In 2020, it was ranked at 65 on the 100 Best Albums of the 21st Century list of Stacker. The same year, Rolling Stone ranked Random Access Memories number 295 on their list of the "500 Greatest Albums of All Time". In 2021, Pitchfork included Random Access Memories on its list of review scores they "would change if they could", adjusting its score from 8.8 out of 10 to 6.8. The Pitchfork critic Philip Sherburne wrote that it "doesn't feel pivotal in the same way that Discovery did" and "didn't push pop music forward".

=== Legacy ===
In a 2023 interview, Avenged Sevenfold frontman M. Shadows cited Random Access Memories as a major inspiration for their album Life Is But a Dream..., praising its approach to analog production and sonic experimentation. Shadows credited Daft Punk with broadening his perspective on composition and album structuring, incorporating elements such as extended instrumental sections and dynamic transitions.

== Awards and nominations ==
Random Access Memories received Grammy Awards for Album of the Year, Best Dance/Electronica Album and Best Engineered Album, Non-Classical for the 56th Annual Grammy Awards. The lead single, "Get Lucky", also won for Record of the Year and Best Pop Duo/Group Performance. "Get Lucky" had previously been nominated for Best Song of the Summer at the 2013 MTV Video Music Awards and Best Song at the 2013 MTV Europe Music Awards.

Accolades for Random Access Memories
Year	Ceremony	Nominated work	Recipient(s)	Category	Result
2013	MTV Video Music Awards	"Get Lucky"	Daft Punk	Best Song of the Summer	Nominated
2013	MTV Europe Music Awards	"Get Lucky"	Daft Punk and Pharrell Williams	Best Song	Nominated
2014	Grammy Awards	"Get Lucky"	Daft Punk, Pharrell Williams and Nile Rodgers; Thomas Bangalter and Guy-Manuel de Homem-Christo, producers; Peter Franco, Mick Guzauski, Florian Lagatta and Daniel Lerner, engineers/mixers; Bob Ludwig, mastering engineer	Record of the Year	Won
2014	Grammy Awards	"Get Lucky"	Daft Punk, Pharrell Williams and Nile Rodgers	Best Pop Duo/Group Performance	Won
2014	Grammy Awards	Random Access Memories	Daft Punk; Julian Casablancas, DJ Falcon, Todd Edwards, Chilly Gonzales, Giorgio Moroder, Panda Bear, Nile Rodgers, Paul Williams and Pharrell Williams, featured artists; Thomas Bangalter, Julian Casablancas, Guy-Manuel de Homem-Christo, DJ Falcon and Todd Edwards, producers; Peter Franco, Mick Guzauski, Florian Lagatta, Guillaume Le Braz and Daniel Lerner, engineers/mixers; Bob Ludwig, mastering engineer	Album of the Year	Won
2014	Grammy Awards	Random Access Memories	Daft Punk	Best Dance/Electronica Album	Won
2014	Grammy Awards	Random Access Memories	Peter Franco, Mick Guzauski, Florian Lagatta and Daniel Lerner, engineers; Bob Ludwig, mastering engineer	Best Engineered Album, Non-Classical	Won

== Sales ==
Random Access Memories debuted at number one on the French Albums Chart with first-week sales of 195,013 copies (127,361 physical sales and 67,652 digital sales), earning Daft Punk their first number-one album in France. The next week, it sold 49,600 copies to remain at the top spot with a 75% sales decrease. It secured a third consecutive week atop the French chart, withstanding a 29% sales drop to 35,500 copies.

Random Access Memories debuted at number one on the UK Albums Chart with 165,091 copies sold in its first week, becoming Daft Punk's first UK number-one album and the second fastest-selling artist album of 2013 after One Direction's Midnight Memories. It remained at number one on the UK chart the following week, selling 52,801 copies. In its third week, it fell to number three on sales of 28,182 copies.

In the United States, Random Access Memories debuted at number one on the Billboard 200 with first-week sales of 339,000 copies, Daft Punk's first number-one album on the chart. It maintained the number one spot in its second week, selling 93,000 copies. In its third week, it sold an additional 62,000 copies and fell to number two on the Billboard 200. The vinyl LP was 2013's top-selling LP, with 49,000 US copies shifted. The album had sold 922,000 copies in the US as of January 2014. On 12 May 2023, it was certified double platinum by the Recording Industry Association of America (RIAA). Following its Album of the Year win at the 56th Annual Grammy Awards, Random Access Memories jumped from number 39 to number 10 on the Billboard 200 with a 300% sales increase, selling 30,000 copies that week.

Random Access Memories entered the Canadian Albums Chart at number one with 46,000 copies sold, the biggest one-week sales total in Canada of 2013. It remained at number one the next week, selling 17,000 copies. In Japan, it debuted at number three on the Oricon Weekly Albums Chart, selling 25,970 copies.

Random Access Memories debuted at number one in several countries across continental Europe, including Austria, Belgium, Czech Republic, Denmark (where it sold 5,392 copies in its first week), Finland, Germany, Ireland, Italy, Norway, Portugal, Spain and Switzerland. In Oceania, Random Access Memories debuted at number one in Australia and New Zealand; it was certified platinum by the Australian Recording Industry Association (ARIA) and gold by the Recording Industry Association of New Zealand (RIANZ) in its first week. As of 2014, Random Access Memories had sold 3.2 million copies worldwide. It received the RIAA certification of 2x Multi-Platinum on 12 May 2023.

== Track listing ==
All tracks are written by Thomas Bangalter and Guy-Manuel de Homem-Christo, additional writers where noted.

Random Access Memories track listing
No.	Title	Writer(s)	Length
1.	"Give Life Back to Music"	Paul Jackson, Jr.; Nile Rodgers	4:34
2.	"The Game of Love"		5:22
3.	"Giorgio by Moroder"	Giovanni Giorgio Moroder	9:04
4.	"Within"	Jason "Chilly Gonzales" Beck	3:48
5.	"Instant Crush" (featuring Julian Casablancas)	Julian Casablancas	5:37
6.	"Lose Yourself to Dance" (featuring Pharrell Williams)	Rodgers; Pharrell Williams	5:53
7.	"Touch" (featuring Paul Williams)	Christopher Paul Caswell; Paul Williams Jr.	8:19
8.	"Get Lucky" (featuring Pharrell Williams and Nile Rodgers)	Rodgers; Williams	6:09
9.	"Beyond"	Caswell; Williams Jr.	4:50
10.	"Motherboard"		5:41
11.	"Fragments of Time" (featuring Todd Edwards)	Todd Imperatrice	4:39
12.	"Doin' It Right" (featuring Panda Bear)	Noah Lennox	4:11
13.	"Contact"	Stéphane Quême; Garth Porter; Tony Mitchell; Daryl Braithwaite	6:23
Total length:			74:28

Japanese CD bonus track
No.	Title	Length
14.	"Horizon"	4:25
Total length:		78:50

Sample credits

- "Contact" contains a sample from "We Ride Tonight", written by Garth Porter, Tony Mitchell and Daryl Braithwaite and performed by the Sherbs, and an excerpt from the Apollo 17 mission, spoken by Eugene Cernan, courtesy of NASA.

== Personnel ==
Adapted from the liner notes.

=== Featured artists ===
- Daft Punk – vocals (tracks 1, 2, 4, 6–9, 12), modular synthesizer (tracks 1, 3, 7, 10, 12, 13),
  synthesizer (tracks 2, 5, 8, 9, 14), keyboards (tracks 3, 4, 5, 11), guitar (track 5), production, concept, art direction
- Panda Bear – vocals (track 12)
- Julian Casablancas – vocals, lead guitar and co-production (track 5)
- Todd Edwards – vocals and co-production (track 11)
- DJ Falcon – modular synthesizer and co-production (track 13)
- Chilly Gonzales – keyboards (track 1), piano (track 4)
- Giorgio Moroder – voice (track 3)
- Nile Rodgers – guitar (tracks 1, 6, 8)
- Paul Williams – vocals and lyrics (track 7), lyrics (track 9)
- Pharrell Williams – vocals (tracks 6, 8)

=== Additional musicians ===
- Greg Leisz – pedal steel guitar (tracks 1–3, 9–11, 14), lap steel guitar (tracks 7, 9)
- Chris Caswell – keyboards (tracks 1–4, 7–11, 14), orchestration, arrangements
- Paul Jackson, Jr. – guitar (tracks 1–3, 7–11, 14)
- Nathan East – bass (tracks 1–6, 8, 11, 14)
- James Genus – bass (tracks 3, 7, 9–11, 13)
- John "J.R." Robinson – drums (tracks 1–6, 14)
- Omar Hakim – drums (tracks 3, 7–9, 11, 13), percussion (track 10)
- Quinn – percussion (tracks 1, 3–5, 7, 10, 11), drums (track 7)
- Thomas Bloch – ondes Martenot (track 7), cristal baschet (track 10)

=== Orchestra ===
Tracks 3, 7, 9, & 10

- Conductor – Douglas Walter
- Contractor – Joseph Solido
- Violin – Assa Drori, Johana Krejci, Rita Weber, Kevin Connolly, Joel Pargman, Songa Lee, Irina Voloshina, Margaret Wooten, Mary K. Sloan, Nina Evtuhov, Miwako Watanabe, Samuel Fischer, Lisa Dondinger, Rafael Rishik, Cynthia Moussas, Sara Perkins, Neel Hammond, Olivia Tsui, Calabria McChesney, Carrie Kennedy, Lisa M. Sutton, Audrey Solomon
- Viola – Andrew Picken, Alma Fernandez, Rodney Wirtz, Carolyn Riley, Harry Shirinan, Jody Rubin, Roland Kato, Ray Tischer
- Cello – Christina Soule, Paula Hochalter, Vanessa F. Smith, Timothy Loo, Armen Ksajikian
- Double bass – Charles Berghofer, Don Ferrone, Drew Dembowski
- Flute – Greg Huckins, Steve Kajala, Sara Andon
- Oboe – Earl Dumler
- Clarinet – Marty Krystall, Gene Cipriano
- Bass clarinet – Gene Cipriano
- Bassoon – Judith Farmer
- English horn – David Kosoff
- French horn – Nathan Campbell, James Atkinson, Justin Hageman, Stephanie O’Keefe, Danielle Ondarza
- Trumpet – Gary Grant, Warren Luening, Charles Findley, Larry McGuire
- Trombone – Andrew Martin, Charles Morillas, Charles Loper, Bob McChesney
- Bass trombone – Craig Gosnell
- Percussion – Brian Kilgore, Mark Converse
- Booth – Chris Caswell
- Choir (track 7) – Shirley Koesnadi, Alissa M. Cremshaw, Elaina S. Crenshaw, Alexandra Gunn, Jeffery Gunn, Emma S. Gunn, Victor Pineshi, Mariah A. Britt, Joshua Britt, Alycia Grant, Chelsea T. DiBlasi, Jessica Rotter, conducted by Angie Jaree

=== Production ===
- Bob Ludwig – mastering
- Chab (Antoine Chabert) – mastering
- Paul Hahn – management
- Cédric Hervet – creative director, cover art
- Warren Fu – cover art, illustrations
- Mick Guzauski – recording, mixing engineer
- Peter Franco – recording engineer
- Florian Lagatta – recording engineer
- Daniel Lerner – digital audio engineer

== Charts ==
=== Weekly charts ===
2013 weekly chart performance for Random Access Memories
Chart (2013)	Peak position
Australian Albums (ARIA)	1
Australian Dance Albums (ARIA)	1
Austrian Albums (Ö3 Austria)	1
Belgian Albums (Ultratop Flanders)	1
Belgian Albums (Ultratop Wallonia)	1
Canadian Albums (Billboard)	1
Croatian Albums (HDU)	6
Czech Albums (ČNS IFPI)	1
Danish Albums (Hitlisten)	1
Dutch Albums (Album Top 100)	2
Finnish Albums (Suomen virallinen lista)	1
French Albums (SNEP)	1
German Albums (Offizielle Top 100)	1
Greek Albums (IFPI)	3
Hungarian Albums (MAHASZ)	1
Irish Albums (IRMA)	1
Italian Albums (FIMI)	1
Japanese Albums (Oricon)	3
Mexican Albums (Top 100 Mexico)	1
New Zealand Albums (RMNZ)	1
Norwegian Albums (VG-lista)	1
Polish Albums (ZPAV)	4
Portuguese Albums (AFP)	1
Scottish Albums (Official Charts)	1
South Korean Albums (Circle)	5
Spanish Albums (Promusicae)	1
Swedish Albums (Sverigetopplistan)	2
Swiss Albums (Schweizer Hitparade)	1
UK Albums (Official Charts)	1
US Billboard 200	1
US Top Dance Albums (Billboard)	1

2021 weekly chart performance for Random Access Memories
Chart (2021)	Peak position
Lithuanian Albums (AGATA)	24

2022 weekly chart performance for Random Access Memories
Chart (2022)	Peak position
Greek Albums (IFPI)	1

=== Year-end charts ===
2013 year-end chart performance for Random Access Memories
Chart (2013)	Position
Argentine Albums (CAPIF)	22
Australian Albums (ARIA)	5
Australian Dance Albums (ARIA)	1
Austrian Albums (Ö3 Austria)	17
Belgian Albums (Ultratop Flanders)	3
Belgian Albums (Ultratop Wallonia)	4
Canadian Albums (Billboard)	12
Danish Albums (Hitlisten)	16
Dutch Albums (Album Top 100)	11
French Albums (SNEP)	2
German Albums (Offizielle Top 100)	22
Hungarian Albums (MAHASZ)	66
Icelandic Albums (Tónlist)	14
Irish Albums (IRMA)	11
Italian Albums (FIMI)	17
Japanese Albums (Oricon)	76
Mexican Albums (Top 100 Mexico)	6
New Zealand Albums (RMNZ)	20
Polish Albums (ZPAV)	13
South Korean International Albums (Circle)	7
Spanish Albums (PROMUSICAE)	31
Swedish Albums (Sverigetopplistan)	18
Swiss Albums (Schweizer Hitparade)	2
UK Albums (OCC)	16
US Billboard 200	19
US Top Dance/Electronic Albums (Billboard)	1

2014 year-end chart performance for Random Access Memories
Chart (2014)	Position
Australian Albums (ARIA)	87
Australian Dance Albums (ARIA)	9
Belgian Albums (Ultratop Flanders)	22
Belgian Albums (Ultratop Wallonia)	11
Danish Albums (Hitlisten)	98
French Albums (SNEP)	12
Italian Albums (FIMI)	68
Mexican Albums (Top 100 Mexico)	30
South Korean International Albums (Circle)	29
Swedish Albums (Sverigetopplistan)	74
Swiss Albums (Schweizer Hitparade)	46
US Billboard 200	118
US Top Dance/Electronic Albums (Billboard)	2

2015 year-end chart performance for Random Access Memories
Chart (2015)	Position
Australian Dance Albums (ARIA)	28
Belgian Midprice Albums (Ultratop Flanders)	35
Belgian Midprice Albums (Ultratop Wallonia)	13
South Korean International Albums (Circle)	85

2016 year-end chart performance for Random Access Memories
Chart (2016)	Position
Australian Dance Albums (ARIA)	25
Belgian Midprice Albums (Ultratop Wallonia)	29

2017 year-end chart performance for Random Access Memories
Chart (2017)	Position
Australian Dance Albums (ARIA)	46
Belgian Midprice Albums (Ultratop Wallonia)	28
US Top Dance/Electronic Albums (Billboard)	17

2018 year-end chart performance for Random Access Memories
Chart (2018)	Position
Australian Vinyl Albums (ARIA)	77
Belgian Midprice Albums (Ultratop Wallonia)	39
US Top Dance/Electronic Albums (Billboard)	18

2019 year-end chart performance for Random Access Memories
Chart (2019)	Position
Australian Dance Albums (ARIA)	38
Australian Vinyl Albums (ARIA)	82
US Top Dance/Electronic Albums (Billboard)	22

2020 year-end chart performance for Random Access Memories
Chart (2020)	Position
Australian Dance Albums (ARIA)	36
US Top Dance/Electronic Albums (Billboard)	17

2021 year-end chart performance for Random Access Memories
Chart (2021)	Position
Australian Dance Albums (ARIA)	16
Belgian Albums (Ultratop Flanders)	173
Belgian Albums (Ultratop Wallonia)	98
US Top Dance/Electronic Albums (Billboard)	7

2022 year-end chart performance for Random Access Memories
Chart (2022)	Position
Australian Dance Albums (ARIA)	12
Belgian Albums (Ultratop Flanders)	105
Belgian Albums (Ultratop Wallonia)	120
US Top Dance/Electronic Albums (Billboard)	5

2023 year-end chart performance for Random Access Memories
Chart (2023)	Position
Australian Dance Albums (ARIA)	11
Belgian Albums (Ultratop Flanders)	124
Belgian Albums (Ultratop Wallonia)	107
US Dance/Electronic Albums (Billboard)	5

2024 year-end chart performance for Random Access Memories
Chart (2024)	Position
Australian Dance Albums (ARIA)	28
US Top Dance/Electronic Albums (Billboard)	13

2025 year-end chart performance for Random Access Memories
Chart (2025)	Position
Australian Dance Albums (ARIA)	36
US Top Dance/Electronic Albums (Billboard)	15

=== Decade-end charts ===
Decade-end chart performance for Random Access Memories
Chart (2010–2019)	Position
Australian Albums (ARIA)	82
UK Vinyl Albums (OCC)	62
US Billboard 200	99
US Top Dance/Electronic Albums (Billboard)	2

== Certifications and sales ==
Certifications and sales for Random Access Memories
Region	Certification	Certified units/sales
Australia (ARIA)	2× Platinum	140,000^{^}
Austria (IFPI Austria)	2× Platinum	30,000^{*}
Belgium (BRMA)	Platinum	30,000^{*}
Canada (Music Canada)	3× Platinum	240,000^{‡}
Denmark (IFPI Danmark)	2× Platinum	40,000^{‡}
Finland (Musiikkituottajat)	Gold	17,178
France (SNEP)	2× Diamond	1,000,000^{‡}
Germany (BVMI)	3× Gold	300,000^{‡}
Ireland (IRMA)	Platinum	15,000^{^}
Italy (FIMI)	3× Platinum	150,000^{‡}
Japan (RIAJ)	Gold	100,000^{^}
Mexico (AMPROFON)	4× Platinum+Gold	270,000^{^}
New Zealand (RMNZ)	3× Platinum	45,000^{^}
Poland (ZPAV)	2× Platinum	40,000^{*}
Portugal (AFP)	Platinum	15,000^{^}
South Korea	—	15,225
Spain (Promusicae)	Gold	20,000^{^}
Sweden (GLF)	Platinum	40,000^{‡}
Switzerland (IFPI Switzerland)	Platinum	20,000^{^}
United Kingdom (BPI)	2× Platinum	600,000^{‡}
United States (RIAA)	2× Platinum	2,000,000^{‡}
^{*} Sales figures based on certification alone.^{^} Shipments figures based on certification alone.^{‡} Sales+streaming figures based on certification alone.
