= Get Lucky (Daft Punk song) =

2013 single by Daft Punk featuring Pharrell Williams and Nile Rodgers

Single by Daft Punk featuring Pharrell Williams and Nile Rodgers

from the album Random Access Memories
- Released: 19 April 2013
- Recorded: 2011–2012
- Genre: Disco; funk; pop
- Length: 6:09 (album version); 4:07 (radio edit)
- Label: Daft Life; Columbia
- Songwriters: Thomas Bangalter; Guy-Manuel de Homem-Christo; Pharrell Williams; Nile Rodgers
- Producers: Daft Punk; Nile Rodgers

Daft Punk singles chronology
| "Derezzed" (2010) | "Get Lucky" (2013) | "Lose Yourself to Dance" (2013) |

Pharrell Williams singles chronology
| "Blurred Lines" (2013) | "Get Lucky" (2013) | "Feds Watching" (2013) |

Nile Rodgers singles chronology
| "Shady" (2012) | "Get Lucky" (2013) | "Lose Yourself to Dance" (2013) |

Audio video
- "Get Lucky" on YouTube

"Get Lucky" is a song by the French electronic music duo Daft Punk featuring American musician Pharrell Williams and American guitarist Nile Rodgers. Daft Punk released the song as the lead single from their fourth studio album, Random Access Memories, on 19 April 2013. Before its release as a single, it was featured in television advertisements broadcast during Saturday Night Live (SNL), after which Rodgers and Williams announced their involvement in the track. "Get Lucky" is a house-inspired disco, funk, and pop track with lyrics that, according to Williams, are about the good fortune of connecting with someone, as well as sexual chemistry. Upon release, it received widespread acclaim from music critics, who praised Williams's vocals and Rodgers's guitar riffs.

"Get Lucky" reached number one in several countries, including Daft Punk's native France, where the Syndicat National de l'Édition Phonographique (SNEP) certified it diamond. The song peaked at number two on the US Billboard Hot 100 for five consecutive weeks, giving Daft Punk their first top-10 hit in the United States. In the UK, the single topped the UK Singles Chart for four weeks and was the second best-selling single of 2013 with 1,308,007 copies sold. It won multiple awards, including Record of the Year and Best Pop Duo/Group Performance at the 56th Annual Grammy Awards. Daft Punk performed "Get Lucky" at the awards, joined by Rodgers, Williams and American singer Stevie Wonder.

== Background ==
Daft Punk first met Nile Rodgers at a listening party in New York City for the duo's 1997 debut album Homework, and became friends thereafter. However, Rodgers noted that a series of near misses and scheduling conflicts had delayed their chance of collaborating. The duo eventually invited him to the Random Access Memories sessions at Electric Lady Studios in New York City.

As a member of production team the Neptunes, Pharrell Williams had helped remix Daft Punk's 2001 song "Harder, Better, Faster, Stronger". Daft Punk then co-wrote and produced the 2010 single "Hypnotize U" by Williams's band, N.E.R.D. Later, Williams ran into Daft Punk at a party hosted by American singer Madonna and said he would work with the duo in any capacity, and at a subsequent meeting in Paris, Williams shared some of his material that had been inspired by Rodgers' music, with whom Daft Punk revealed they had recently been writing and recording.

== Production ==
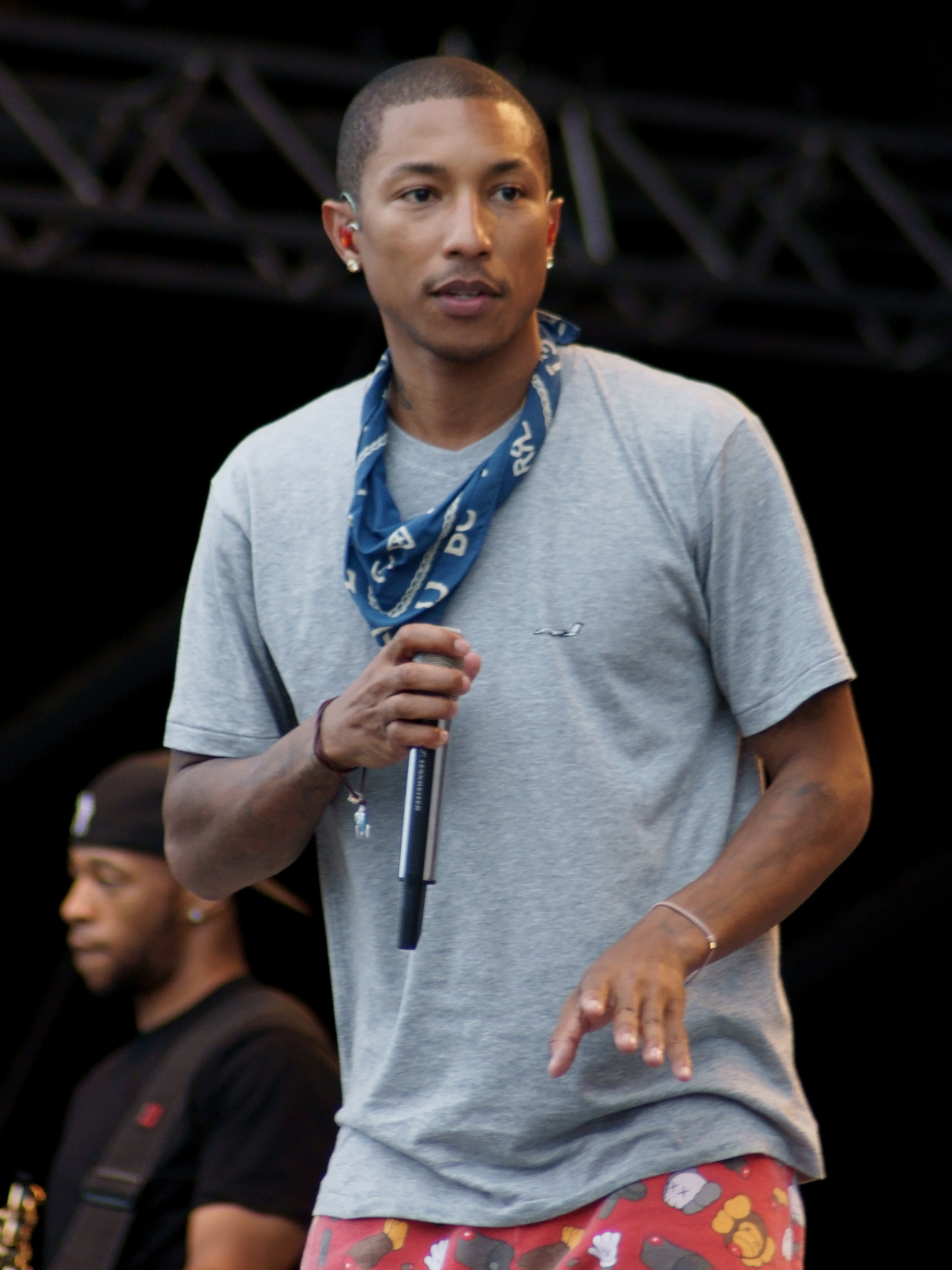
Pharrell Williams performed vocals for "Get Lucky".

"Get Lucky" was completed in approximately 18 months. Prior to Rodgers's involvement, the song existed in a rough form and centered around a Wurlitzer electronic piano. After listening to Daft Punk's demo of what would become "Get Lucky", Rodgers asked that all of the elements except the drum track be muted so that he could create a suitable guitar part; he recalled that he experimented until the duo were visibly pleased. Once Rodgers finished, Daft Punk had Nathan East re-record the bass part to fit Rodgers's performance. Rodgers further elaborated: "Everybody else wound up re-playing to me." Mixer and engineer Mick Guzauski recalled that the rhythm guitar fit easily into the production: "I experimented with balancing and other positioning, and working other stuff around it. He didn't have to be processed – Nile just sounded great the way he is." The song as it appears on the album also features a synthesizer and vocals by Daft Punk, keyboards by Chris Caswell and additional guitar performed by Paul Jackson Jr.

Williams noted that the duo adopted a perfectionist approach when recording the vocals for "Get Lucky", as he was asked to perform several takes and multiple instances of specific phrases. He also said that when he returned to the United States after recording his vocals, he had "forgotten everything" regarding the composition of "Get Lucky". He attributed it to jet lag, but jokingly wondered if Daft Punk had tampered with his memory. The duo responded, saying that Williams's lyrics and performance had arisen spontaneously, and was likely the reason he had trouble recalling the song.

In promotion of the 10th anniversary edition of the album, a video series Memory Tapes was released throughout 2023. In Williams's episode, he revealed that he did not expect his vocals to be on the finished versions of "Get Lucky" and "Lose Yourself to Dance". The episode contains footage of Williams's reaction upon listening to both of the completed songs for the first time.

== Composition ==
"Get Lucky"
"Get Lucky" features vocals by Pharrell Williams and vocoders performed by Daft Punk.

Music critics described "Get Lucky" as a house-inspired disco, funk, and pop track. It is composed in the key of F♯ minor, in the B dorian mode and follows the chord progression of Bm^{7}–D–F♯m^{7}–E. It runs at common time with a tempo of 116 BPM.

In an article for Slate, Owen Pallett states that the song can be heard in two different keys: "Most of the time it sounds as if it's in the minor mode of [F♯] Aeolian [...] essentially a form of [F♯] minor", which appears as the third chord of the progression on the line "We're up all night for good fun". The first chord of the progression is not F♯ minor, but B minor; the song "slides back to it each time" on the line "I'm up all night to get some". Pallett continues, "when the chord cycle comes back to the beginning [...] the ear is tricked for a moment into thinking that the song is in a different key, a musical Tilt-a-Whirl". British journalist Caitlin Moran speculated that the song's catchiness comes from combination of minor chords and regular disco-type upbeats throughout, with the former creating an unresolved feeling.

Friend and occasional collaborator Chilly Gonzales mentioned that Daft Punk had previously used that chord progression in "Around the World" and that the verse, pre-chorus and chorus of "Get Lucky" are largely defined by the melodic phrasing of the vocal. He also noted the resemblance of the upward-moving sustained notes in the pre-chorus to those in the title phrase of the song "Can't Help Falling in Love". Jake Cohen wrote for Consequence that the rising pattern complemented the sense of "ascending 'to the stars'". Pallett further described that in the bridge, Daft Punk "overlay the hook from the pre-chorus with the hook from the chorus, getting them both going simultaneously". Jason Lipshutz of Billboard mentioned that the song has "an effectively simple hook and clipped robo-breakdown to create a warm, winning throwback".

Tim Jonze for The Guardian said the lyrics are an "ode to joyless sex, hard-won after a war of attrition". He also noted the lyrics "She's up all night 'til the sun / I'm up all night to get some / She's up all night for good fun / I'm up all night to get lucky" are about "sexual politics". Cohen described the chorus as the "easy-to-sing celebration of hedonistic good times" and commended the vocoder outro. Williams mentioned that the title "Get Lucky" does not refer only to sexual acts, but also to good fortune of meeting and immediately connecting with someone. Rodgers noted that the titular phrase plays off a guitar line he had contributed, and thus the song may have ended up with a completely different title had Rodgers not been involved. Williams also remarked that the music evoked the sense of being on an exotic island during a "peachy color[ed]" sunrise.

== Promotion ==
"Get Lucky" was first publicly revealed in March 2013 via two 15-second television advertisements on Saturday Night Live (SNL) Rodgers announced his contribution shortly afterward, and noted that various fan remixes of the clips appeared online since it aired. The third trailer, which was shown at the Coachella Valley Music and Arts Festival, officially announced Williams's involvement and features Daft Punk, Rodgers, and Williams performing together. The promotional web series The Collaborators featured excerpts of "Get Lucky", and had the Williams-focused episode in which the song was first referred to by name. The song was leaked and broadcast on various radio stations days before it was released as a single. One day before the song's release, the single's cover artwork was revealed on Amazon, featuring a band playing in front of a setting sun.

Daft Punk released the song as the lead single from their fourth and final studio album, Random Access Memories, on 19 April 2013. A trailer for the official "Get Lucky" remix was released via the Columbia Records YouTube channel on 25 June 2013. Rodgers later stated that video footage for "Lose Yourself to Dance" had been shot simultaneously with footage for "Get Lucky". The Daft Punk remix was later released on Spotify and, as of 27 June 2013, was streamed 64 million times. Rodgers stated in an interview with The Guardian that a different video for the song was shot in March 2013, which is distinct from the Coachella trailer. A 12" vinyl single was released on 16 July 2013, featuring a ten-minute remix by Daft Punk, the album version and the radio edit.

== Reception ==
=== Critical response ===
"Get Lucky" received universal acclaim. Michael Cragg from The Guardian said the song "eschews the crunching electronics of their last album and the vocoder-lead [sic] future-disco of Discovery", and it was the "best thing Pharrell Williams has been involved with for a long time". Pitchfork listed "Get Lucky" as a Best New Track, stating that the song's "real elegance lies in the hands of Nile Rodgers"; one of its contributors, Mark Richardson, opined the song was a "deserved hit". Lewis Corner from Digital Spy gave the single five out five stars and said although Daft Punk's "creative methods may be unorthodox, the final result is a legal rush we can all enjoy". Thomas Smith of NME said the song is "impossibly good" and called it an "old-school jam session that's been spun into a super-sleek slice of pop magic". Chris Mincher of The A.V. Club stated the song "has run up the charts with little more than a simple, breezy funk groove". The staff of Rolling Stone said the song has a "bright guitar shimmer, robot come-ons, falsetto soul and a beat that keeps you up having good fun until you see the sun".

Steve Lampiris for The Line of Best Fit said "Get Lucky" is the "breeziest thing Daft Punk have ever made. The itchy slink of Nile Rodgers' guitar suggests a wonderful sunset that never ends". For AllMusic, Heather Phares praised the song as "so suave that it couldn't help but be an instant classic, albeit a somewhat nostalgic one". Slate's Geeta Dayal described the track as a "breezy, infectious disco hit [that] seemed to be a good omen". Benji Taylor of Renowned for Sound mentioned the song is "driven by Nile Rodgers' irresistible funk fuelled guitar licks, and feature[s] vocals by Williams that would not have sounded out of place on Off the Wall or Thriller". Tatiana Cirisano of Billboard stated it has a "dreamy, retro-meets-futurism magic and a perfectly ambiguous message". Miles Raymer for the Chicago Reader opined it is a "quintessential summer jam, bouncy but not oppressively eager to get you to dance, with a Pharrell vocal hook that's basically impossible to get out of your head once it's in there and a guitar riff from the legendary Nile Rodgers that's nearly as hard to shake".

Abby Johnston for The Austin Chronicle thought the track "refuses to tire, propelled forward by a sparkling Seventies guitar riff and Williams' falsetto". Aaron Payne of musicOMH called the track a "real dancefloor filler" and said it has the "groove that Daft Punk are searching for elsewhere on the record, but that's because of Nile Rodgers' guitar; the man is a human groove. Pharrell supplies stylish, modern hooks to go over Rodgers' guitar, and Daft Punk's production and beats add the remaining crucial elements." Eric Henderson of Slant Magazine said the song is a "model of reservation next to the likes of 'Aerodynamic' or even 'Technologic'". Dan Weiss of Paste criticized the song, saying that it "is no miracle; it's not brought off by Pharrell's uncomplicated voice or Nile Rodgers' studied grooves". Robin Murray for Clash opined the song was "such a safe bet – and it feels it" and that "from the crisp, pared down Nile Rodgers guitar to the bubbling synths, it feels ready-made, arriving with a nagging sense that you've heard it some place before".

=== Accolades ===
"Get Lucky" was nominated for Best Song of the Summer at the 2013 MTV Video Music Awards. and Best Song at the 2013 MTV Europe Music Awards. The song was nominated for Top Streaming Song (Audio) and Top Dance/Electronic Song at the 2014 Billboard Music Awards. It was also nominated for Choice Music Single: Group and Choice Summer Song at the 2013 Teen Choice Awards. It was ranked by Rolling Stone and The Guardian as the best track of 2013.

On 26 January 2014, "Get Lucky" reached number three in Triple J's Hottest 100 of 2013. The Village Voice's Pazz & Jop annual critics' poll ranked "Get Lucky" as the number one single of 2013. It won Best Foreign Song at both the 2013 Sweden Gaffa Awards and Denmark Gaffa Awards. The song received awards for both Best Pop Duo/Group Performance and Record of the Year at the 56th Annual Grammy Awards. The song won Song of the Year at the 2014 BMI London Awards. It was listed at number 465 on Rolling Stone's "500 Greatest Songs of All Time" in 2021.

== Commercial performance ==
In France, "Get Lucky" debuted at number one on the French Singles Chart on 27 April 2013, and became Daft Punk's first chart-topping single in their home country since "One More Time" in 2000. The song sold 38,887 copies in three days, making "Get Lucky" the best-selling digital single in a one-week period. It stayed on the chart for a total of 62 weeks. The Syndicat National de l'Édition Phonographique (SNEP) certified it diamond. In the United Kingdom, "Get Lucky" debuted at number three on the UK Singles Chart on 21 April 2013, sold more than 50,000 copies 48 hours after its release and became Daft Punk's first top-10 hit in the United Kingdom since "One More Time" in 2000. The song then peaked at number one the following week, sold over 155,000 copies, and became Daft Punk's first and only number one single in the UK. It remained in the top position during the following week and sold over 163,000. "Get Lucky" remained at the top of the chart for another three consecutive weeks, selling over 100,000 copies weekly. By late May 2013, over 600,000 copies of the song were sold in four weeks, and sales had exceeded those of Macklemore and Ryan Lewis's "Thrift Shop", which made "Get Lucky" the country's best-selling single of the year at that point. According to the Official Charts Company, the single became Britain's second best-selling single of 2013 with sales of 1,308,007 copies.

In the United States, the song debuted at number 19 on the US Billboard Hot 100 on 24 April 2013, selling 113,000 downloads, which gave Daft Punk their first top 40 hit on the chart. On 22 May 2013, it rose from number 15 to number 10, and became Daft Punk's first top-10 hit in the US. A few weeks later, "Get Lucky" peaked at number two for five consecutive weeks, and was runner-up to Robin Thicke's "Blurred Lines", which also features Williams. This made Williams the first artist in four years to have songs peak at both number one and two simultaneously on the Hot 100. Chris Molanphy of Slate claimed that the single did not reach number one because "Blurred Lines" had digital sales, radio, online streaming and video. The song debuted at number five on the Billboard Dance/Electronic Songs chart for the week ending 4 May 2013. By the week of 1 June, it rose to number one, "Get Lucky" also reached the number one position on the Hot Dance Club Songs chart, the first Daft Punk song to do so since "Face to Face" in 2004. As of April 2014, it has sold over 3,475,000 copies in the US. It received the RIAA certification of 8x Multi-Platinum on 12 May 2023.

The song broke records with the highest number of plays of any song in a single day on Spotify. "Get Lucky" peaked at number one on singles charts of Australia, Austria, both the Belgium Flanders and Wallonia charts, Denmark, Finland, Germany, Hungary, Ireland, Israel, Italy, Norway, Scotland, Slovakia, Slovenia, South Africa, Spain, Sweden, and Switzerland.

== Live performances ==
Upon its official release, Williams performed "Get Lucky" live for the first time at an HTC One launch party in Brooklyn. Daft Punk were scheduled to appear on 6 August episode of The Colbert Report to promote Random Access Memories, but were unable to do so because of contractual obligations regarding their scheduled appearance at the 2013 MTV Video Music Awards. According to Stephen Colbert, Daft Punk were unaware of any exclusivity agreement and were stopped by MTV executives the morning before taping. Colbert nevertheless performed a pre-recorded elaborate dance number to "Get Lucky" featuring appearances from Hugh Laurie, Jeff Bridges, Jimmy Fallon, The Rockettes, Bryan Cranston, Jon Stewart, Matt Damon, Charlie Rose and Henry Kissinger. On 26 January 2014, American singer Stevie Wonder joined Rodgers, Williams and Daft Punk onstage to perform the song during the 56th Annual Grammy Awards, as a medley with Rodgers' "Le Freak" and Wonder's "Another Star". In June 2017, Williams performed the song with American-British singer Marcus Mumford at Ariana Grande's One Love Manchester benefit concert.

== Formats and track listings ==
Digital download
| No. | Title | Features | Length |
|---|---|---|---|
| 1. | "Get Lucky" (radio edit) | Pharrell Williams | 4:07 |

CD single
| No. | Title | Features | Length |
|---|---|---|---|
| 1. | "Get Lucky" (album version) | Pharrell Williams | 6:08 |
| 2. | "Get Lucky" (radio edit) | Pharrell Williams | 4:07 |
| Total length: | | | 10:15 |

Digital download – remix
| No. | Title | Features | Length |
|---|---|---|---|
| 1. | "Get Lucky" (Daft Punk remix) | Pharrell Williams | 10:33 |

12" Single
| No. | Title | Features | Length |
|---|---|---|---|
| 1. | "Get Lucky" (Daft Punk remix) | Pharrell Williams | 10:31 |
| 2. | "Get Lucky" (album version) | Pharrell Williams | 6:08 |
| 3. | "Get Lucky" (radio edit) | Pharrell Williams | 4:07 |
| Total length: | | | 20:46 |

== Credits and personnel ==
Credits adapted from Random Access Memories liner notes.

- Daft Punk – production, vocals, synthesizer
- Pharrell Williams – vocals
- Nile Rodgers – guitar
- Paul Jackson, Jr. – guitar
- Chris Caswell – keyboards
- Nathan East – bass
- Omar Hakim – drums

== Charts ==
=== Weekly charts ===
Weekly chart performance for "Get Lucky"
| Chart (2013–2014) | Peak position |
|---|---|
| Australia (ARIA) | 1 |
| Austria (Ö3 Austria Top 40) | 1 |
| Belgium (Ultratop 50 Flanders) | 1 |
| Belgium (Ultratop 50 Wallonia) | 1 |
| Canada Hot 100 (Billboard) | 2 |
| CIS Airplay (TopHit) | 1 |
| Czech Republic Airplay (ČNS IFPI) | 3 |
| Czech Republic Singles Digital (ČNS IFPI) | 1 |
| Denmark (Tracklisten) | 1 |
| Euro Digital Song Sales (Billboard) | 1 |
| Finland (Suomen virallinen lista) | 2 |
| France (SNEP) | 1 |
| Germany (GfK) | 1 |
| Hungary (Dance Top 40) | 1 |
| Hungary (Rádiós Top 40) | 1 |
| Hungary (Single Top 40) | 1 |
| Ireland (IRMA) | 1 |
| Israel International Airplay (Media Forest) | 1 |
| Italy (FIMI) | 1 |
| Japan Hot 100 (Billboard) | 6 |
| Japan Adult Contemporary (Billboard) | 1 |
| Luxembourg Digital Song Sales (Billboard) | 1 |
| Mexico Airplay (Monitor Latino) | 8 |
| Netherlands (Dutch Top 40) | 2 |
| Netherlands (Single Top 100) | 2 |
| New Zealand (Recorded Music NZ) | 2 |
| Norway (VG-lista) | 2 |
| Poland Airplay (ZPAV) | 2 |
| Poland Dance (ZPAV) | 1 |
| Russia Airplay (TopHit) | 1 |
| Scottish Singles Sales (Official Charts) | 1 |
| Slovakia Airplay (ČNS IFPI) | 1 |
| Slovakia Singles Digital (ČNS IFPI) | 1 |
| Slovenia Airplay (SloTop50) | 1 |
| South Africa Airplay (EMA) | 1 |
| Spain (Promusicae) | 1 |
| Sweden (Sverigetopplistan) | 2 |
| Switzerland (Schweizer Hitparade) | 1 |
| Ukraine Airplay (TopHit) | 12 |
| UK Singles (Official Charts) | 1 |
| UK Dance (Official Charts) | 1 |
| US Billboard Hot 100 | 2 |
| US Adult Alternative Airplay (Billboard) | 29 |
| US Adult Contemporary (Billboard) | 18 |
| US Adult Pop Airplay (Billboard) | 8 |
| US Alternative Airplay (Billboard) | 5 |
| US Dance Club Songs (Billboard) | 1 |
| US Dance Airplay (Billboard) | 1 |
| US Hot Dance/Electronic Songs (Billboard) | 1 |
| US Latin Pop Airplay (Billboard) | 6 |
| US Pop Airplay (Billboard) | 2 |
| US R&B/Hip-Hop Airplay (Billboard) | 37 |
| US Rhythmic Airplay (Billboard) | 2 |

2022–2023 weekly chart performance
| Chart (2022–2023) | Peak position |
|---|---|
| CIS Airplay (TopHit) | 123 |
| Global 200 (Billboard) | 92 |
| Kazakhstan Airplay (TopHit) | 35 |
| Lithuania Airplay (TopHit) | 156 |
| Russia Airplay (TopHit) | 177 |
| Slovakia Singles Digital (ČNS IFPI) | 87 |

2024–2026 weekly chart performance
| Chart (2024–2026) | Peak position |
|---|---|
| Belarus Airplay (TopHit) | 189 |
| Brazil Airplay (Crowley) | 160 |
| CIS Airplay (TopHit) | 141 |
| Estonia Airplay (TopHit) | 154 |
| Kazakhstan Airplay (TopHit) | 52 |
| Moldova Airplay (TopHit) | 91 |
| Russia Airplay (TopHit) | 176 |

=== Year-end charts ===
2013 year-end chart performance for "Get Lucky"
| Chart (2013) | Position |
|---|---|
| Australia (ARIA) | 7 |
| Austria (Ö3 Austria Top 40) | 13 |
| Belgium (Ultratop Flanders) | 2 |
| Belgium (Ultratop Wallonia) | 3 |
| Canada (Canadian Hot 100) | 6 |
| Denmark (Tracklisten) | 4 |
| France (SNEP) | 1 |
| Germany (Media Control AG) | 4 |
| Hungary (Dance Top 40) | 4 |
| Hungary (Rádiós Top 40) | 6 |
| Ireland (IRMA) | 4 |
| Israel (Media Forest) | 1 |
| Italy (FIMI) | 1 |
| Italy Airplay (EarOne) | 2 |
| Japan (Japan Hot 100) | 12 |
| Netherlands (Dutch Top 40) | 5 |
| Netherlands (Mega Single Top 100) | 3 |
| New Zealand (Recorded Music NZ) | 9 |
| Russia Airplay (TopHit) | 3 |
| Slovenia (SloTop50) | 2 |
| Spain (PROMUSICAE) | 2 |
| Sweden (Sverigetopplistan) | 14 |
| Switzerland (Schweizer Hitparade) | 3 |
| Ukraine Airplay (TopHit) | 28 |
| UK Singles (Official Charts Company) | 2 |
| US Billboard Hot 100 | 14 |
| US Adult Top 40 (Billboard) | 36 |
| US Alternative Songs (Billboard) | 26 |
| US Dance Club Songs (Billboard) | 4 |
| US Dance/Mix Show Airplay (Billboard) | 7 |
| US Hot Dance/Electronic Songs (Billboard) | 2 |
| US Mainstream Top 40 (Billboard) | 18 |
| US Rock Airplay (Billboard) | 26 |
| US Rhythmic (Billboard) | 6 |

2014 year-end chart performance for "Get Lucky"
| Chart (2014) | Position |
|---|---|
| Belgium (Ultratop Flanders) | 99 |
| Belgium Urban (Ultratop) | 17 |
| Brazil (Crowley) | 76 |
| France (SNEP) | 28 |
| Hungary (Dance Top 40) | 20 |
| Hungary (Single Top 40) | 78 |
| Italy (FIMI) | 79 |
| Netherlands (Single Top 100) | 93 |
| Russia Airplay (TopHit) | 72 |
| Slovenia (SloTop50) | 22 |
| US Hot Dance/Electronic Songs (Billboard) | 13 |

2021 year-end chart performance for "Get Lucky"
| Chart (2021) | Position |
|---|---|
| US Hot Dance/Electronic Songs (Billboard) | 77 |

Year-end chart performance
| Chart (2025) | Position |
|---|---|
| Argentina Anglo Airplay (Monitor Latino) | 47 |
| Chile Airplay (Monitor Latino) | 19 |

=== Decade-end charts ===
Decade-end chart performance for "Get Lucky"
| Chart (2010–2019) | Position |
|---|---|
| Australia (ARIA) | 90 |
| UK Singles (Official Charts Company) | 36 |
| US Hot Dance/Electronic Songs (Billboard) | 13 |

=== All-time charts ===
All-time chart performance for "Get Lucky"
| Chart (2013–2020) | Position |
|---|---|
| UK Singles (Official Charts Company) | 45 |

== Certifications and sales ==
Certifications and sales for "Get Lucky"
| Region | Certification | Certified units/sales |
|---|---|---|
| Australia (ARIA) | 6× Platinum | 420,000^{^} |
| Austria (IFPI Austria) | Platinum | 30,000^{*} |
| Belgium (BRMA) | 2× Platinum | 60,000^{*} |
| Canada (Music Canada) | Diamond | 800,000^{‡} |
| Denmark (IFPI Danmark) | Platinum | 30,000^{^} |
| Finland (Musiikkituottajat) | Gold | 53,429 |
| France (SNEP) | Diamond | 411,000 |
| Germany (BVMI) | 5× Gold | 750,000^{‡} |
| Italy (FIMI) | 5× Platinum | 150,000^{‡} |
| Mexico (AMPROFON) | 3× Diamond+3× Platinum+Gold | 1,110,000^{‡} |
| New Zealand (RMNZ) | 6× Platinum | 180,000^{‡} |
| Norway (IFPI Norway) | 2× Platinum | 20,000^{*} |
| Portugal (AFP) | 2× Platinum | 40,000^{‡} |
| Spain (Promusicae) | Gold | 20,000^{*} |
| Sweden (GLF) | 2× Platinum | 80,000^{‡} |
| Switzerland (IFPI Switzerland) | 3× Platinum | 90,000^{^} |
| United Kingdom (BPI) | 5× Platinum | 3,000,000^{‡} |
| United States (RIAA) | 8× Platinum | 8,000,000^{‡} |
Streaming
| Denmark (IFPI Danmark) | 4× Platinum | 10,400,000^{†} |
^{*} Sales figures based on certification alone.^{^} Shipments figures based on certification alone.^{‡} Sales+streaming figures based on certification alone.^{†} Streaming-only figures based on certification alone.

== See also ==
- List of number-one dance singles of 2013 (U.S.)
- List of number-one singles of 2013 (South Africa)
