= Chris Caswell =

American musician

- Birth name: Christopher Paul Caswell
- Born: Rochester, New York, U.S.
- Genres: Jazz; folk; pop; soft rock
- Occupations: Musician; songwriter; arranger; producer
- Website: chriscaswell.com

Christopher Paul "Kazz" Caswell is an American musician, record producer, composer, songwriter, and arranger. He is a frequent collaborator with Paul Williams and has worked on several productions by The Muppets.

== Career ==
Born in Rochester, Caswell moved to Los Angeles and has worked in music for over forty years, largely working in children's entertainment. Caswell is a frequent collaborator of Paul Williams, often acting as his music director, and has worked with Williams for over 37 years. Caswell has worked on several film and television series from The Muppets, often alongside Williams. He was nominated for a Grammy Award due to his contributions in the soundtrack to The Muppet Christmas Carol.

Caswell is a multi-instrumentalist that has also worked with artists ranging from Smokey Robinson, Willie Nelson, Bonnie Raitt, Chris Mann, Natasha Bedingfield, Bill Withers, and Jason Mraz.

Caswell met with the electronic music duo Daft Punk around the same time as their work on the soundtrack to Tron: Legacy, with Caswell recommending engineers for the duo to work with. Caswell worked on the orchestration and arrangement alongside session musicians for their 2013 album Random Access Memories. Caswell introduced the duo to Paul Williams, who would go on to compose "Touch" and "Beyond" from the album alongside Caswell. The album won Album of the Year and Best Dance/Electronica Album, as well as the lead single "Get Lucky" winning Record of the Year and Best Pop Duo/Group Performance at the 56th Annual Grammy Awards. Caswell performed in the Beatles tribute with Ringo Starr and Paul McCartney, and also performed alongside Daft Punk, Stevie Wonder and album collaborators Nile Rodgers, Pharrell Williams, Omar Hakim, Nathan East, and Paul Jackson Jr. at the same Grammy ceremony.

== Discography ==
=== Notable work ===
- A Chipmunk Christmas (1981) - Score, arrangement, orchestration
  - Songwriting on "Crash Cup Christmas" and "The Spirit of Christmas"
- The Muppet Christmas Carol (1992) - Partial score
  - Songwriting on "Fozziwigs Party"
- A Muppets Christmas: Letters to Santa (2008) - Score & all songs
- Iron Man 2 (2010) - Arrangement on "Make Way For Tomorrow Today"
- The Muppets (2011) - Arrangement on "Man or Muppet"
- Random Access Memories by Daft Punk - Arrangement, orchestration, keyboards
  - Songwriting on "Touch" and "Beyond"
- Muppets Most Wanted (2014) - Orchestration
- "I Feel It Coming" (ft. Daft Punk) by The Weeknd (2016) - keyboards
