= List of songs recorded by Daft Punk =

Songs recorded by Daft Punk

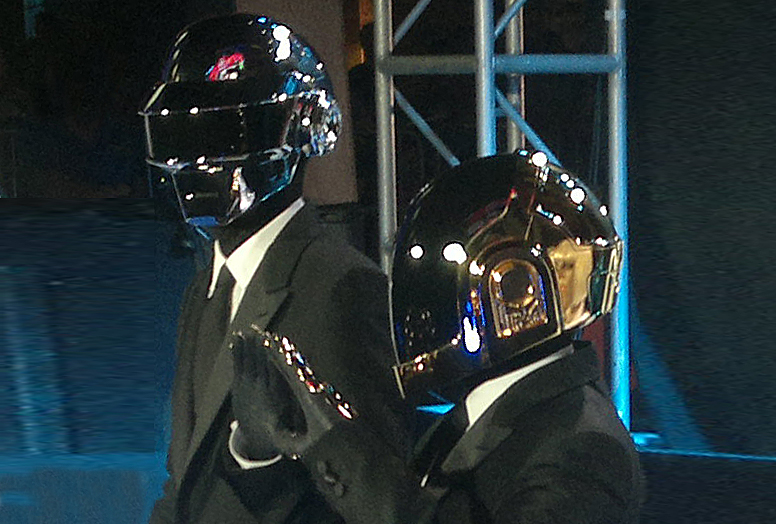
Thomas Bangalter (left) and Guy-Manuel de Homem-Christo (right)

Daft Punk were a French electronic music duo that recorded over 90 songs between 1994 and 2021. The duo has been influential in the dance and French house genres of music. Beginning in 1992 as Darlin' with Laurent Brancowitz, the group disbanded in 1993, and Bangalter and de Homem-Christo formed Daft Punk. The pair's first single, "The New Wave", was released in 1994. Their next single, "Da Funk", was their first commercial success, and is now seen as a house music classic. After the success of "Da Funk", Daft Punk released their first studio album, Homework, in 1997. The album's songs are heavily inspired by funk and dance music, and features "thick, rumbling bass and vocoders". Homework brought worldwide attention to French house music.

Their follow-up, the concept album Discovery, was released in 2001. The album's sound is different from its predecessor, being noticeably influenced by disco music and is characterised as more polished; Discovery was supported by the Franco-Japanese animated film Interstella 5555: The 5tory of the 5ecret 5tar 5ystem. Later that year, the group released their first live album, Alive 1997. The album contains a forty-five minute excerpt from a live show in 1997. The duo's next album, Human After All, was released in 2005. Made in only six weeks, the album's songs have been described as repetitive and minimalist, and is less produced than Homework and Discovery. Songs from the album would later be used for the group's second live album, the critically acclaimed Alive 2007.

In 2010, the group composed the film score for Disney's Tron: Legacy; the soundtrack album was released later that year. The album's songs have been described as "soaring and ominous" and take inspiration from modern classical music. During this time, the duo recorded a song called "Computerized" with American rapper Jay-Z; the song remains officially unreleased. The band released their fourth studio album, Random Access Memories, in 2013. The album deviated from the duo's previous works by featuring live instrumentation and an array of guest musicians, including Pharrell Williams, Nile Rodgers, Julian Casablancas, and Giorgio Moroder on tracks such as "Lose Yourself to Dance", "Instant Crush", and "Giorgio by Moroder", respectively. Backed by the lead single, "Get Lucky", the album was a major critical and commercial success, topping multiple year-end lists and earning the group multiple Grammy Awards. The song "Horizon" was released as bonus track on the Japanese edition of Random Access Memories. Since 2013, the duo has collaborated with multiple artists, such as The Weeknd, being a featured artist on his songs "Starboy" and "I Feel It Coming" from his 2016 album Starboy. The duo announced their breakup in February 2021.

== Songs ==
Key
†	Indicates single release
‡	Indicates songs not solely written by Daft Punk

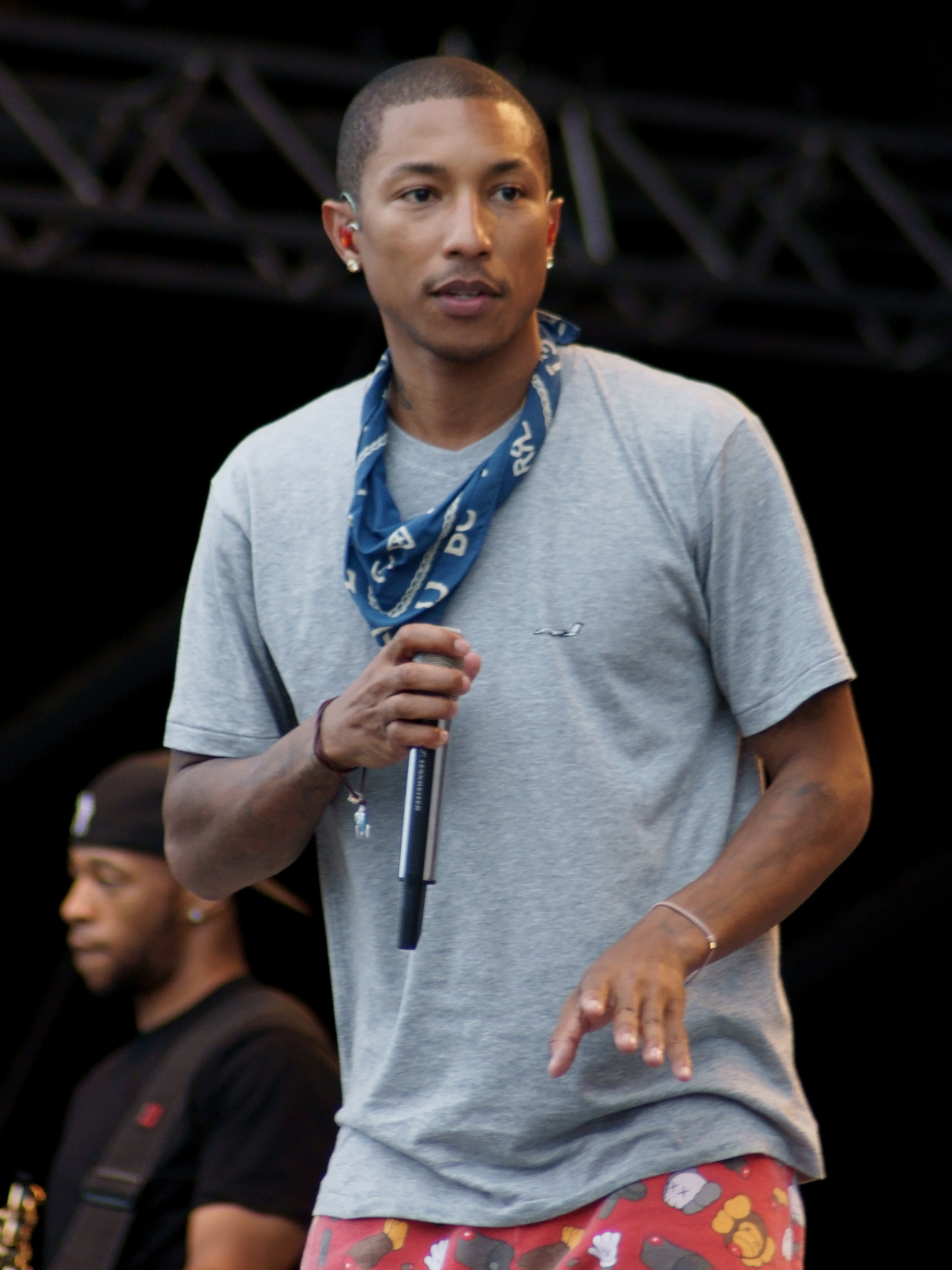
Pharrell Williams sang lead vocals on "Get Lucky" and "Lose Yourself to Dance" from Random Access Memories in 2013.

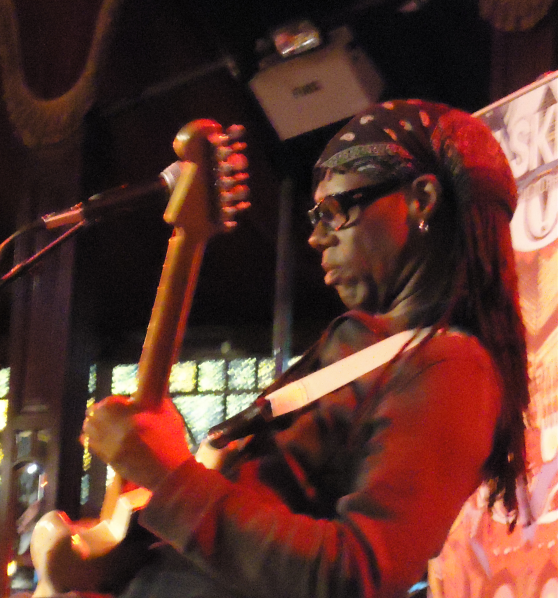
Nile Rodgers collaborated with Daft Punk for Random Access Memories in 2013.

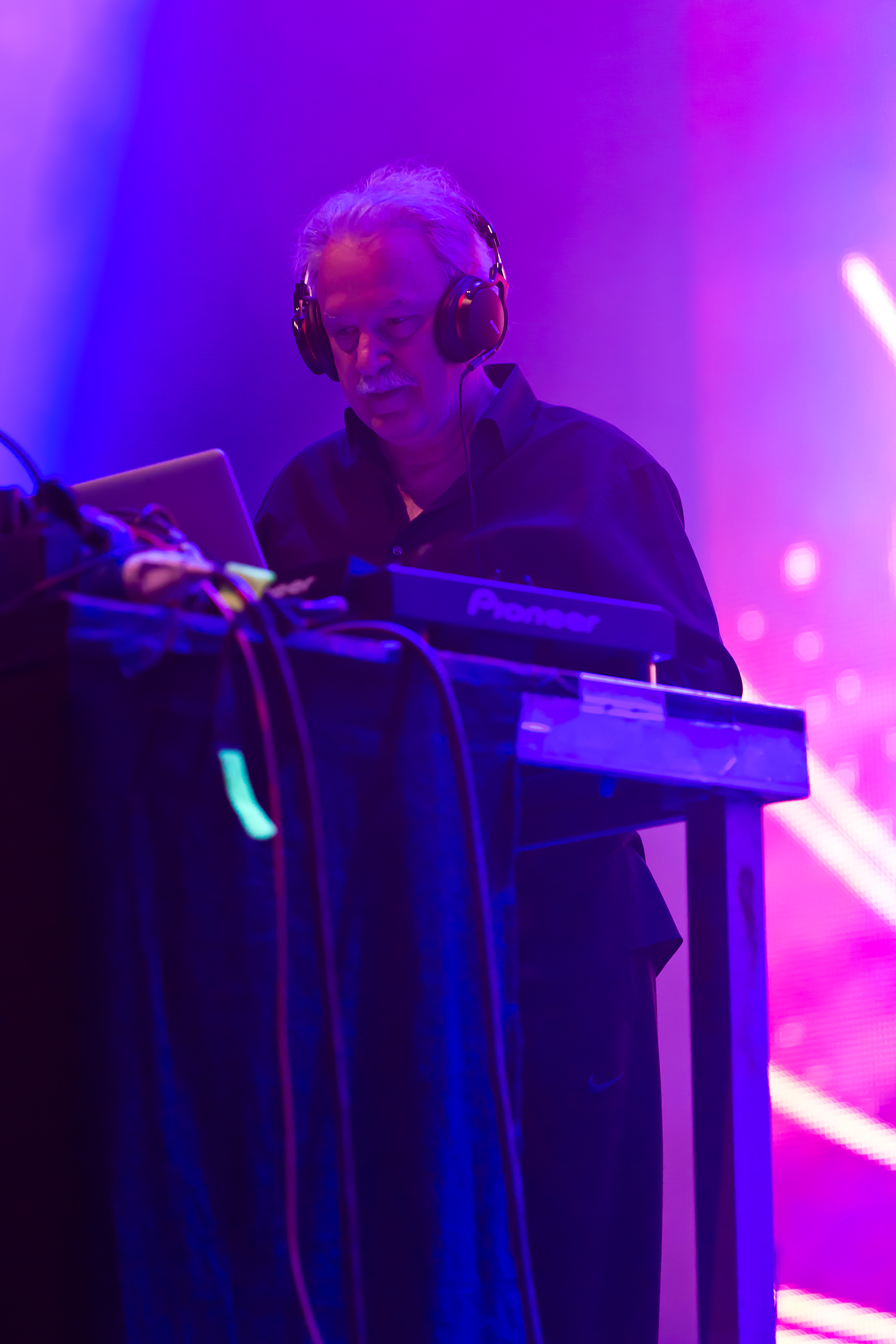
The song "Giorgio by Moroder" features a monologue by Giorgio Moroder.

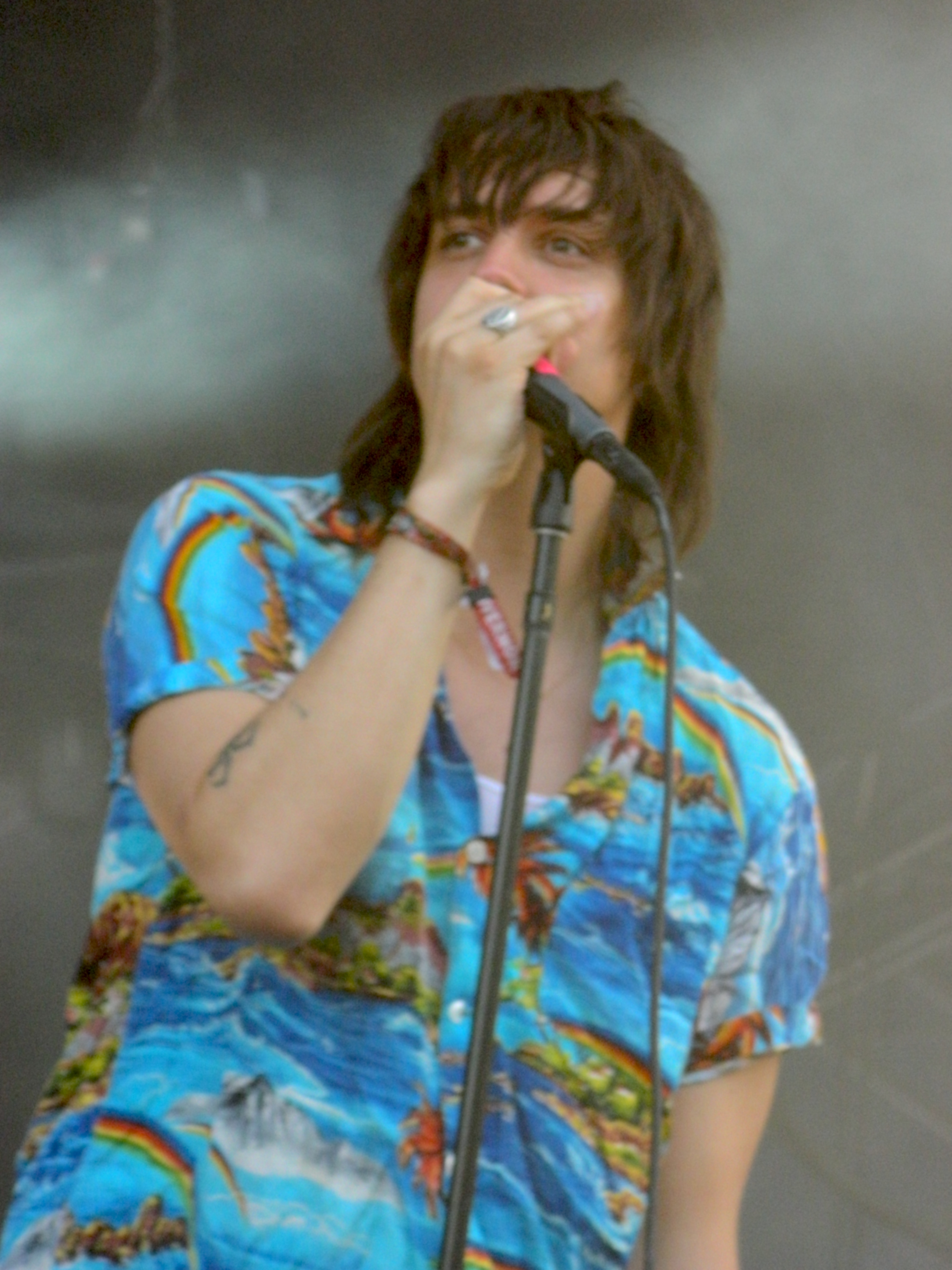
Daft Punk collaborated with Julian Casablancas on the songs "Instant Crush" and "Infinity Repeating."

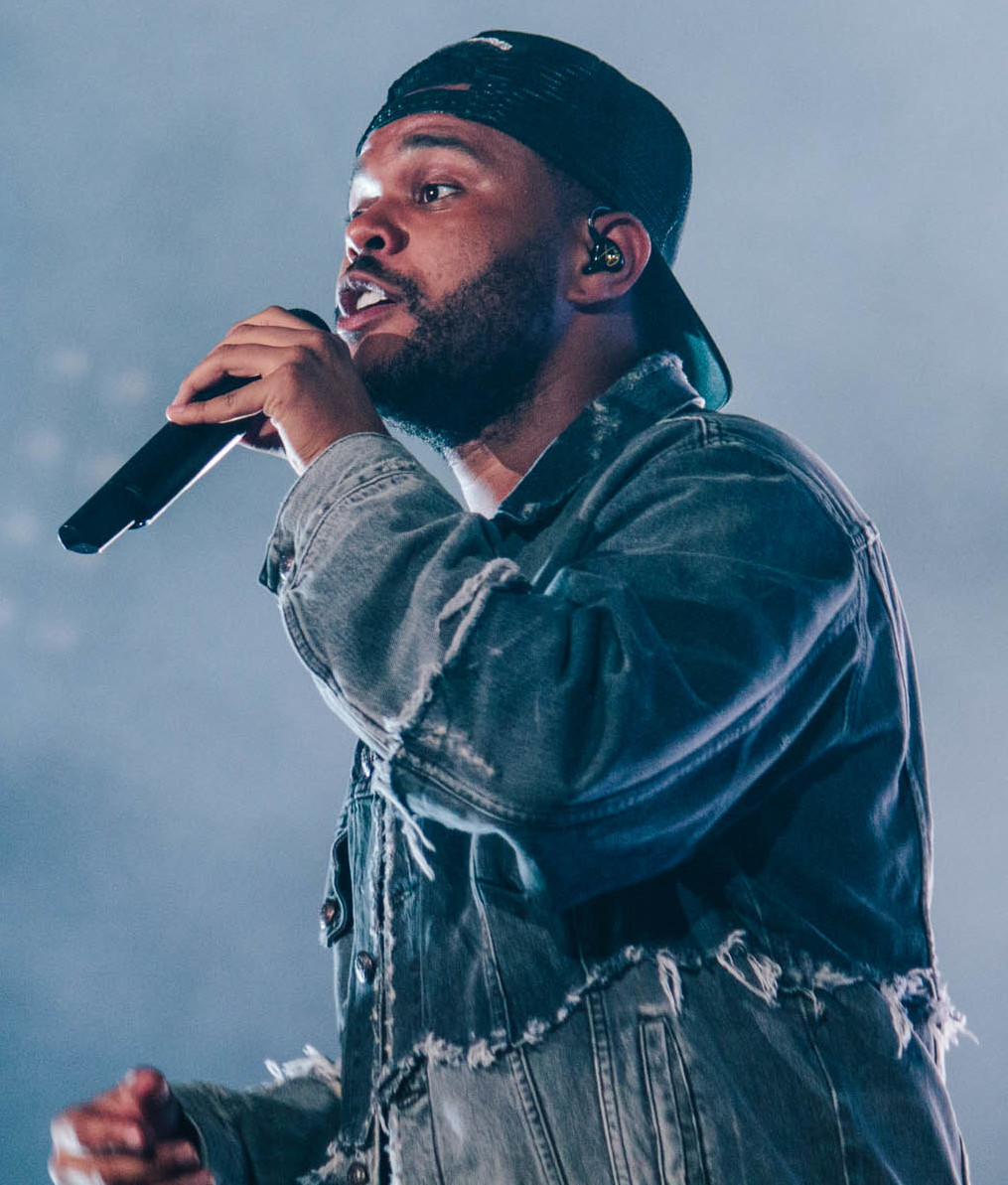
Daft Punk collaborated with the Weeknd on his songs "Starboy" and "I Feel It Coming" from his album Starboy in 2016.

Name of song, writers, original release, and year of release
Song	Writers	Original release	Year	Ref.
"Adagio for Tron"	Daft Punk	Tron: Legacy (soundtrack)	2010	
"Aerodynamic" †	Daft Punk	Discovery	2001	
"Aerodynamite"	Daft Punk	Non-album single B-side to "Aerodynamic"	2001	
"Alive" (Note: "Alive" is a final mix of "The New Wave". "The New Wave" single includes several mixes of the title track with the last track explicitly titled "Alive (New Wave Final Mix)".)	Daft Punk	Homework	1994	
"Arena"	Daft Punk	Tron: Legacy (soundtrack)	2010	
"Armory"	Daft Punk	Tron: Legacy (soundtrack)	2010	
"Around the World" †	Daft Punk	Homework	1997	
"Arrival"	Daft Punk	Tron: Legacy (soundtrack)	2010	
"Assault"	Daft Punk	Non-album single B-side to "The New Wave"	1994	
"ß Wax" (featuring DJ Kevin)	Daft Punk; DJ Kevin	Two Years Together (compilation)	1995	
"Beyond"	Daft Punk; Christopher Paul Caswell; Paul Williams Jr. ‡	Random Access Memories	2013	
"The Brainwasher"	Daft Punk	Human After All	2005	
"Burnin'" †	Daft Punk	Homework	1997	
"Castor" (Note: Bonus track on the special edition of Tron: Legacy.)	Daft Punk	Tron: Legacy (soundtrack)	2010	
"C.L.U."	Daft Punk	Tron: Legacy (soundtrack)	2010	
"Computerized" (featuring Jay-Z)	—N/a	Unreleased		
"Contact"	Daft Punk; Stéphane Quême; Garth Porter; Tony Mitchell; Daryl Braithwaite ‡	Random Access Memories	2013	
"Crescendolls"	Daft Punk; Dwight Brewster; Aleta Jennings ‡	Discovery	2001	
"Da Funk" †	Daft Punk	Homework	1995	
"Daftendirekt"	Daft Punk	Homework	1997	
"Derezzed" †	Daft Punk	Tron: Legacy (soundtrack)	2010	
"Digital Love" †	Daft Punk; Carlos Sosa; George Duke ‡	Discovery	2001	
"Disc Wars"	Daft Punk	Tron: Legacy (soundtrack)	2010	
"Doin' It Right" † (featuring Panda Bear)	Daft Punk; Noah Lennox ‡	Random Access Memories	2013	
"Drive Unreleased 1994"	Daft Punk	Soma Records 20 Years (compilation)	2011	
"Emotion"	Daft Punk	Human After All	2005	
"ENCOM, Part I"	Daft Punk	Tron: Legacy (soundtrack)	2010	
"ENCOM, Part II"	Daft Punk	Tron: Legacy (soundtrack)	2010	
"End of Line"	Daft Punk	Tron: Legacy (soundtrack)	2010	
"Face to Face" † (featuring Todd Edwards)	Daft Punk; Todd Edwards ‡	Discovery	2001	
"Fall"	Daft Punk	Tron: Legacy (soundtrack)	2010	
"Father and Son" (Note: Bonus track on the iTunes version of Tron: Legacy.)	Daft Punk	Tron: Legacy (soundtrack)	2010	
"Finale"	Daft Punk	Tron: Legacy (soundtrack)	2010	
"Flynn Lives"	Daft Punk	Tron: Legacy (soundtrack)	2010	
"Fragments of Time" (featuring Todd Edwards)	Daft Punk; Todd Edwards ‡	Random Access Memories	2013	
"Fresh"	Daft Punk	Homework	1997	
"Funk Ad"	Daft Punk	Homework	1997	
"The Game Has Changed"	Daft Punk	Tron: Legacy (soundtrack)	2010	
"The Game of Love"	Daft Punk	Random Access Memories	2013	
"Get Lucky" † (featuring Pharrell Williams & Nile Rodgers)	Daft Punk; Pharrell Williams; Nile Rodgers ‡	Random Access Memories	2013	
"Giorgio by Moroder"	Daft Punk; Giorgio Moroder ‡	Random Access Memories	2013	
"Give Life Back to Music" †	Daft Punk; Paul Jackson Jr. Nile Rodgers ‡	Random Access Memories	2013	
"The Grid" (featuring Jeff Bridges)	Daft Punk	Tron: Legacy (soundtrack)	2010	
"Harder, Better, Faster, Stronger" †	Daft Punk; Edwin Birdsong ‡	Discovery	2001	
"High Fidelity"	Daft Punk	Homework	1997	
"High Life"	Daft Punk	Discovery	2001	
"Horizon" (Note: Bonus track on the Japanese edition of Random Access Memories.)	Daft Punk	Random Access Memories (Japanese & 10th Anniversary Edition)	2013	
"Horizon Ouverture"	Daft Punk	Random Access Memories (10th Anniversary Edition)	2023	
"Human After All" †	Daft Punk	Human After All	2005	
"I Feel It Coming" † (The Weeknd featuring Daft Punk)	Abel Tesfaye; Daft Punk; Martin McKinney; Henry Walter; Eric Chedeville ‡	Starboy	2016	
"Indo Silver Club" †	Daft Punk	Homework	1996	
"Indo Silver Club (Part One)" †	Daft Punk	Non-album single	1996	
"Infinity Repeating (2013 Demo)" † (featuring Julian Casablancas & The Voidz)	Daft Punk; Julian Casablancas ‡	Random Access Memories (10th Anniversary Edition)	2023	
"Instant Crush" † (featuring Julian Casablancas)	Daft Punk; Julian Casablancas ‡	Random Access Memories	2013	
"Lose Yourself to Dance" † (featuring Pharrell Williams)	Daft Punk; Pharrell Williams; Nile Rodgers ‡	Random Access Memories	2013	
"Make Love"	Daft Punk	Human After All	2005	
"Motherboard"	Daft Punk	Random Access Memories	2013	
"Musique"	Daft Punk	Non-album single B-side to "Da Funk"	1996	
"The New Wave" †	Daft Punk	Non-album single	1994	
"Nightvision"	Daft Punk	Discovery	2001	
"Nocturne"	Daft Punk	Tron: Legacy (soundtrack)	2010	
"Oh Yeah"	Daft Punk	Homework	1997	
"On/Off"	Daft Punk	Human After All	2005	
"One More Time" † (featuring Romanthony)	Daft Punk; Anthony Moore ‡	Discovery	2000	
"Outlands"	Daft Punk	Tron: Legacy (soundtrack)	2010	
"Outlands, Part II"	Daft Punk	Tron: Legacy (soundtrack)	2010	
"Ouverture"	Daft Punk	Daft Club	2003	
"Overture"	Daft Punk	Tron: Legacy (soundtrack)	2010	
"Phoenix"	Daft Punk	Homework	1997	
"Prime (2012 Unfinished)"	Daft Punk	Random Access Memories (10th Anniversary Edition)	2023	
"The Prime Time of Your Life" †	Daft Punk	Human After All	2005	
"Recognizer"	Daft Punk	Tron: Legacy (soundtrack)	2010	
"Rectifier"	Daft Punk	Tron: Legacy (soundtrack)	2010	
"Reflections"	Daft Punk	Tron: Legacy (soundtrack)	2010	
"Revolution 909" †	Daft Punk	Homework	1997	
"Rinzler"	Daft Punk	Tron: Legacy (soundtrack)	2010	
"Robot Rock" †	Daft Punk; Kae Williams ‡	Human After All	2005	
"Rock'n Roll"	Daft Punk	Homework	1997	
"Rollin' & Scratchin'"	Daft Punk	Homework	1995	
"Round One"	Daft Punk	Tron: Legacy (soundtrack)	2010	
"Sea of Simulation" (Note: Bonus track on the vinyl edition of Tron: Legacy.)	Daft Punk	Tron: Legacy (soundtrack)	2010	
"Short Circuit"	Daft Punk	Discovery	2001	
"Solar Sailer"	Daft Punk	Tron: Legacy (soundtrack)	2010	
"Something About Us" †	Daft Punk	Discovery	2001	
"The Son of Flynn"	Daft Punk	Tron: Legacy (soundtrack)	2010	
"Starboy" † (The Weeknd featuring Daft Punk)	Abel Tesfaye; Daft Punk; Martin McKinney; Henry Walter; Jason Quenneville ‡	Starboy	2016	
"Steam Machine"	Daft Punk	Human After All	2005	
"Sunrise Prelude"	Daft Punk	Tron: Legacy (soundtrack)	2010	
"Superheroes"	Daft Punk; Barry Manilow; Marty Panzer ‡	Discovery	2001	
"Teachers"	Daft Punk	Homework	1997	
"Technologic" †	Daft Punk	Human After All	2005	
"Television Rules the Nation"	Daft Punk	Human After All	2005	
"Too Long" (featuring Romanthony)	Daft Punk; Anthony Moore ‡	Discovery	2001	
"Touch" (featuring Paul Williams Jr.)	Daft Punk; Christopher Paul Caswell; Paul Williams Jr. ‡	Random Access Memories	2013	
"Tron Legacy (End Titles)"	Daft Punk	Tron: Legacy (soundtrack)	2010	
"Veridis Quo"	Daft Punk	Discovery	2001	
"Voyager"	Daft Punk	Discovery	2001	
"WDPK 83.7 FM"	Daft Punk	Homework	1997	
"Within"	Daft Punk; Jason "Chilly Gonzales" Beck ‡	Random Access Memories	2013	

== See also ==
- Daft Punk discography
