= Homework (Remixes) =

Remix album by Daft Punk
- Released: 22 February 2022
- Length: 77:13 (CD); 67:50 (LP); 107:53 (digital)
- Label: Warner Music France
- Producer: Various

Daft Punk chronology
Random Access Memories (2013)	Homework (Remixes) (2022)	Random Access Memories (10th Anniversary Edition) (2023)

Homework (Remixes) is a remix album by French electronic music duo Daft Punk, released by Warner Music France on 22 February 2022. The release coincided with the 25th anniversary of Daft Punk's album Homework. It comprises remixes of tracks from Homework by artists including DJ Sneak, Masters at Work, Todd Terry, Motorbass, Slam and Ian Pooley. As a standalone album, it peaked at number 17 on the Billboard Dance/Electronic Albums chart.

== Release ==
On 22 February 2022, a year after they announced their breakup, Daft Punk updated their social media channels with cryptic posts leading to a new Twitch account. At 2:22pm UTC, a one-time only stream began of Daft Punk's full Daftendirektour performance at the Mayan Theater. At the same time, a 25th-anniversary edition of Homework released digitally featuring the original album and 15 remixes, nine of which were previously unavailable on digital platforms. This was the first of several yearly celebratory announcements and events related to the anniversary of the duo's split, later being called "Daft Punk Day".

Homework (Remixes) was released as a standalone album featuring the 15 remixes. It was released worldwide on vinyl and CD on 25 November 2022. Homework (Remixes) charted in multiple countries and reached number 17 on the Billboard Dance/Electronic Albums chart.

== Track listing ==
Homework (Remixes)
No.	Title	Length
1.	"Around the World" (I:Cube remix)	6:18
2.	"Revolution 909" (Roger Sanchez & Junior Sanchez remix)	8:56
3.	"Around the World" (Tee's Frozen Sun mix)	7:57
4.	"Around the World" (Mellow mix)	7:51
5.	"Burnin'" (DJ Sneak main mix)	9:10
6.	"Around the World" (KenLou remix)	7:50
7.	"Burnin'" (Ian Pooley Cut Up mix)	5:20
8.	"Around the World" (Motorbass Vice mix)	6:37
9.	"Around the World" (M.A.W. remix)	9:23
10.	"Burnin'" (Slam mix)	6:47
11.	"Around the World" (Original Lead On mix)	7:30
12.	"Burnin'" (DJ Sneak Mongowarrier mix)	10:23
13.	"Around the World" (RAW dub)	6:54
14.	"Teachers" (extended mix)	5:53
15.	"Revolution 909" (Revolution A capella)	1:04
Total length:		107:53

== Charts ==
Chart performance for Homework (Remixes)
Chart (2022)	Peak position
French Albums (SNEP)	28
US Top Dance Albums (Billboard)	17
