= D.A.F.T.: A Story About Dogs, Androids, Firemen and Tomatoes =

Video by Daft Punk
- Released: 28 March 2000
- Genre: House
- Length: 1 hour
- Label: Virgin
- Directors: Michel Gondry; Roman Coppola; Seb Janiak; Spike Jonze; Daft Punk
- Producer: Daft Punk

Daft Punk chronology
D.A.F.T.: A Story About Dogs, Androids, Firemen and Tomatoes (2000)	Interstella 5555 (2003)

Professional ratings
Review scores
Source	Rating
Allmovie	3/5 stars
The A.V. Club	Favorable

D.A.F.T.: A Story About Dogs, Androids, Firemen and Tomatoes is a video collection by French electronic music duo Daft Punk that was released on March 28, 2000. It features music videos of six tracks from their album Homework (1997). Though its title derives from the appearance of dogs ("Da Funk" and "Fresh"), androids ("Around the World"), firemen ("Burnin'"), and tomatoes ("Revolution 909") in the videos, there is no actual cohesive plot connecting any of the episodes.

The video features four singles and an album track from their critically acclaimed debut album, Homework. Each of the music videos features a "making of" documentary, except for the album track "Rollin' & Scratchin'", whose music video is a live performance in Los Angeles, California.

== Video listing ==
- "Da Funk"

Audio commentary with Spike Jonze
The Making of "Da Funk" (Featuring Armand Van Helden Remix)
The Making of the Dog's Head (Featuring "On Da Rocks" by Thomas Bangalter)

- "Around the World"

Audio commentary with Michel Gondry
In the classroom with Michel Gondry
The Making of "Around the World" (Featuring Masters At Work Remix)

- "Burnin'"

Audio commentary with Seb Janiak
The Making of "Burnin'" (Featuring Ian Pooley "Cut Up" Mix)

- "Revolution 909"

Audio commentary with Roman Coppola
The Making of "Revolution 909" (Featuring Roger Sanchez Remix)

- "Fresh"

The Rehearsal of The "Fresh" Shot With Daft Punk
The Making of "Fresh"

- "Rollin' & Scratchin'" (Live in L.A.)
