= You're Sorry =

Single by Todd Edwards
- Released: January 25, 2019
- Recorded: 2019
- Length: 3:32
- Label: Defected
- Songwriter(s): Todd Edwards
- Producer(s): Todd Edwards

Todd Edwards singles chronology
"It Is Wrong" (2018)	"You're Sorry" (2019)

"You're Sorry" is a single produced and recorded by American house musician Todd Edwards. The track became his first number one on Billboard's Dance Club Songs Chart in its April 27, 2019 issue.

== Track listing ==
=== Single ===
Digital download
No.	Title	Length
1.	"You're Sorry" (Original)	3:21
2.	"You're Sorry" (Earsling Dub)	3:30

=== Remixes ===
Digital download
No.	Title	Length
1.	"You're Sorry" (Extended Mix)	5:56
2.	"You're Sorry" (Earsling Extended Dub)	5:49

== Charts ==
=== Weekly charts ===
Chart (2019)	Peak position
US Dance Club Songs (Billboard)	1

=== Year-end charts ===
Chart (2019)	Position
US Dance Club Songs (Billboard)	24

== See also ==
- List of Billboard number-one dance songs of 2019
