= Random Access Memories (10th Anniversary Edition) =

2023 compilation album by Daft Punk

Compilation album by Daft Punk
- Released: 12 May 2023
- Recorded: 2008–2013
- Genres: Disco; funk; electronic; soft rock; progressive pop
- Length: 110:46
- Labels: Columbia; Legacy
- Producers: Thomas Bangalter; Guy-Manuel de Homem-Christo; Julian Casablancas; Todd Edwards; DJ Falcon

Daft Punk chronology
Homework (Remixes) (2022)	Random Access Memories (10th Anniversary Edition) (2023)	Random Access Memories (Drumless Edition) (2023)

Singles from Random Access Memories (10th Anniversary Edition)
- 1. "The Writing of Fragments of Time" Released: 22 March 2023; 2. "GLBTM (Studio Outtakes)" Released: 20 April 2023; 3. "Infinity Repeating (2013 Demo)" Released: 12 May 2023

Professional ratings
Review scores
Source	Rating
Clash	9/10
Pitchfork	7.7/10

Random Access Memories (10th Anniversary Edition) is the third compilation album by French electronic music duo Daft Punk. It is an anniversary reissue of the duo's final studio album Random Access Memories, containing an extra disc with 35 minutes of bonus content, including unreleased demos and outtakes. The reissue was released on 12 May 2023.

== Promotion and release ==
On 22 February 2021, Daft Punk announced they had disbanded. Exactly two years later, on 22 February 2023, the duo announced a 10th anniversary edition of Random Access Memories would release, containing a bonus disc of demos and outtakes. 22 February was retroactively titled "Daft Punk Day", on which a new release and/or celebratory event is announced.

Daft Punk member Thomas Bangalter, during the promotion of his solo project Mythologies, said the duo had wanted to not "spoil the narrative" while they were active, but felt more comfortable revealing parts of their creative process now that "the story has ended".

The reissue includes the version of "Touch" used in the video announcing Daft Punk's disbandment. A Dolby Atmos version of the reissue was also released the same day as the reissue, featuring the original 13 album tracks and “The Writing of Fragments of Time” remixed in the format.

The first single from the reissue, "The Writing of Fragments of Time", featuring Todd Edwards, was released on 22 March, along with a music video directed by Daft Punk's creative director, Cédric Hervet. "GLBTM (Studio Outtakes)" was released on 20 April, featuring previously unused studio recordings by Chilly Gonzales and other session musicians for "Give Life Back to Music".

Another single, "Infinity Repeating (2013 Demo)", features Julian Casablancas and the Voidz. The song and an accompanying music video directed by Warren Fu premiered on 11 May at the Centre Pompidou in Paris, France. Casablancas discussed the song in interviews in 2014. The music video, the song, and the structuring of the bonus disc of the reissue are all based on an infinity loop. Daft Punk called the track their "last song ever" in its press release. A four-part video series focusing on the making of the music video was released in December.

The week before the reissue's release, coordinates and the date of 11 May 2023 appeared in Spotify visualizers for specific songs off the original album, teasing a global event happening in ten cities: Berlin, Buenos Aires, London, Mexico City, New York City, Paris, Santa Monica, São Paulo, Sydney, and Tokyo. Later that week, it was revealed that Snapchat had partnered with Daft Punk's creative team to promote the reissue using augmented reality filters and lenses. Worldwide users could use the app to get early access to the track "Horizon", with attendees at the ten cities getting to participate in a geolocated scavenger hunt. Participants at the locations could use the Snapchat filter to find Monoliths playing snippets of the "Infinity Repeating" music video.

The release of the reissue resulted in the album reappearing at the top of the Billboard Dance/Electronic Albums chart and within the top 10 on the Billboard 200.

=== Memory Tapes ===
In promotion of the 10th anniversary reissue, the band released a video series throughout the year called Memory Tapes. The series' guests include Julian Casablancas, Chilly Gonzales, Panda Bear, DJ Falcon, Todd Edwards, Pharrell Williams, Nile Rodgers, Paul Williams and Chris Caswell. The videos were shot at Gang Studios in Paris and Henson Studios in Los Angeles and feature behind-the-scenes footage of the recording of Random Access Memories.

Made up of eight episodes, the series features many of the album's collaborators reflecting on the duo's status, music, and split. Julian Casablancas discusses the creation of "Instant Crush" and "Infinity Repeating," saying he thought the latter was a fitting song to "end Daft Punk on forever," while also joking that the idea was "dramatic," not believing the duo would stay permanently split. Chilly Gonzales called the duo's work on the album "Stanley Kubrick levels of planning" when discussing his piano solo on "Within."

Collaborators DJ Falcon and Todd Edwards spoke on the duo's split as well, with Falcon specifically praising the choice to end Daft Punk with the song and video for "Infinity Repeating". Edwards expressed regret that Daft Punk did not tour Random Access Memories, but stated he was not shocked when they split, saying the two "were already going in different directions, musically".

Pharrell Williams revealed in his episode that he did not expect the finished versions of "Get Lucky" or "Lose Yourself to Dance" to feature his vocals, assuming both songs would be sung by other artists. Williams said he was so focused during the writing and recording sessions that he forgot what the material had sounded like, due to the length of time between meetings and the lack of access to the material. His episode contains footage of Williams' reaction to hearing both finished tracks for the first time.

Nile Rodgers described the experience of working with the duo as life-changing, saying "life was one way before Random Access Memories, and completely different after." Rodgers called the album's impact a learning experience and spoke about how the album led to him collaborating with younger artists of different cultures. The final episode of Memory Tapes features Chris Caswell and Paul Williams. The two discuss first meeting Daft Punk, the importance of Phantom of the Paradise to the duo's history, and end by thanking them for making an album that encourages listeners to "explore," stating "there's so much out there."

== Track listing ==
Random Access Memories track listing
No.	Title	Writer(s)	Length
1.	"Give Life Back to Music"	Thomas Bangalter; Guy-Manuel de Homem-Christo; Paul Jackson Jr.; Nile Rodgers	4:34
2.	"The Game of Love"	Bangalter; de Homem-Christo	5:22
3.	"Giorgio by Moroder"	Bangalter; de Homem-Christo; Giovanni Giorgio Moroder	9:04
4.	"Within"	Bangalter; Jason "Chilly Gonzales" Beck; de Homem-Christo	3:48
5.	"Instant Crush" (with Julian Casablancas)	Bangalter; Julian Casablancas; de Homem-Christo	5:37
6.	"Lose Yourself to Dance" (with Pharrell Williams)	Bangalter; de Homem-Christo; Rodgers; Pharrell Williams	5:53
7.	"Touch" (with Paul Williams)	Bangalter; Christopher Paul Caswell; de Homem-Christo; Paul Williams Jr.	8:19
8.	"Get Lucky" (with Pharrell Williams and Nile Rodgers)	Bangalter; de Homem-Christo; Rodgers; Pharrell Williams	6:09
9.	"Beyond"	Bangalter; Caswell; de Homem-Christo; Paul Williams Jr.	4:50
10.	"Motherboard"	Bangalter; de Homem-Christo	5:41
11.	"Fragments of Time" (with Todd Edwards)	Bangalter; de Homem-Christo; Todd Imperatrice	4:39
12.	"Doin' It Right" (with Panda Bear)	Bangalter; de Homem-Christo; Noah Lennox	4:11
13.	"Contact"	Bangalter; de Homem-Christo; Stéphane Quême; Garth Porter; Tony Mitchell; Daryl Braithwaite	6:23
Total length:			74:28

10th anniversary edition bonus disc
No.	Title	Writer(s)	Length
14.	"Horizon Ouverture"	Bangalter; de Homem-Christo	2:08
15.	"Horizon (Japan CD)"	Bangalter; de Homem-Christo	4:25
16.	"GLBTM (Studio Outtakes)"	Bangalter; de Homem-Christo; Jackson Jr.; Rodgers	6:22
17.	"Infinity Repeating (2013 Demo)" (with Julian Casablancas + The Voidz)	Bangalter; Casablancas; de Homem-Christo	4:00
18.	"GL (Early Take)" (with Pharrell Williams and Nile Rodgers)	Bangalter; de Homem-Christo; Rodgers; Pharrell Williams	0:33
19.	"Prime (2012 Unfinished)"	Bangalter; de Homem-Christo	4:46
20.	"LYTD (Vocoder Tests)" (with Pharrell Williams)	Bangalter; de Homem-Christo; Rodgers; Pharrell Williams	2:08
21.	"The Writing of Fragments of Time" (with Todd Edwards)	Bangalter; de Homem-Christo; Imperatrice	8:17
22.	"Touch (2021 Epilogue)" (with Paul Williams)	Bangalter; Caswell; de Homem-Christo; Paul Williams Jr.	3:00
Total length:			36:18

Sample credits

- "Contact" contains a sample from "We Ride Tonight", as performed by the Sherbs, and an excerpt from the Apollo 17 mission, spoken by Eugene Cernan, courtesy of NASA.

== Personnel ==
Adapted from the liner notes. The bonus disc, other than "Horizon", does not have individual performer credits.

=== Reissue supervised by ===
- Thomas Bangalter
- Guy-Manuel de Homem-Christo
- Florian Lagatta
- Cédric Hervet

=== Featured artists ===
- Daft Punk – vocals (tracks 1, 2, 4, 6–9, 12), modular synthesizer (tracks 1, 3, 7, 10, 12, 13), synthesizer (tracks 2, 5, 8, 9, 15), keyboards (tracks 3, 4, 5, 11), guitar (track 5), production, concept, art direction
- Panda Bear – vocals (track 12)
- Julian Casablancas – vocals (track 5, 17), lead guitar (track 5) and co-production (track 5, 17)
- Todd Edwards – vocals and co-production (track 11)
- DJ Falcon – modular synthesizer and co-production (track 13)
- Chilly Gonzales – keyboards (track 1), piano (track 4)
- Giorgio Moroder – voice (track 3)
- Nile Rodgers – guitar (tracks 1, 6, 8)
- The Voidz – additional instrumentation (track 17)
- Paul Williams – vocals and lyrics (track 7), lyrics (track 9)
- Pharrell Williams – vocals (tracks 6, 8)

=== Additional musicians ===
- Greg Leisz – pedal steel guitar (tracks 1–3, 9–11, 15), lap steel guitar (tracks 7, 9)
- Chris Caswell – keyboards (tracks 1–4, 7–11, 15), orchestration, arrangements
- Paul Jackson Jr. – guitar (tracks 1–3, 7–11, 15)
- Nathan East – bass (tracks 1–6, 8, 11, 15)
- James Genus – bass (tracks 3, 7, 9–11, 13)
- John "J.R." Robinson – drums (tracks 1,2, 4–6, 15)
- Omar Hakim – drums (tracks 3, 7–9, 11, 13), percussion (track 10)
- Quinn – percussion (tracks 1, 3–5, 7, 10, 11), drums (track 7)
- Thomas Bloch – ondes Martenot (track 7), cristal baschet (track 10)

=== Orchestra ===
- Conductor – Douglas Walter
- Contractor – Joseph Solido
- Violin – Assa Dori, Johana Krejci, Rita Weber, Kevin Connolly, Joel Pargman, Song Lee, Irina Voloshina, Margaret Wooten, Mary K. Sloan, Nina Evtuhov, Miwako Watanabe, Samuel Fischer, Lisa Dondinger, Rafael Rishik, Cynthia Moussas, Sara Perkins, Neel Hammond, Olivia Tsui, Calabria McChesney, Carrie Kennedy, Lisa Sutton, Audrey Solomon
- Viola – Andrew Picken, Alma Fernandez, Rodney Wirtz, Carolyn Riley, Harry Shirinan, Jody Rubin, Roland Kato, Ray Tischer
- Cello – Christina Soule, Paula Hochalter, Vanessa F. Smith, Timothy Loo, Armen Ksajikian
- Double bass – Charles Berghofer, Don Ferrone, Drew Dembowski
- Flute – Greg Huckins, Steve Kajala, Sara Andon
- Oboe – Earl Dumler
- Clarinet – Marty Krystall, Gene Cipriano
- Bass clarinet – Gene Cipriano
- Bassoon – Judith Farmer
- English horn – David Kosoff
- French horn – Nathan Campbell, James Atkinson, Justin Hageman, Stephanie O’Keefe, Danielle Ondarza
- Trumpet – Gary Grant, Warren Luening, Charles Findley, Larry McGuire
- Trombone – Andrew Martin, Charles Morillas, Charles Looper, Bob McChesny
- Bass trombone – Craig Gosnell
- Percussion – Brian Kilgore, Mark Converse
- Booth – Chris Caswell
- Choir (track 7, 14, 22) – Shirley Koesnadi, Alissa M. Cremshaw, Elaina S. Crenshaw, Alexandra Gunn, Jeffery Gunn, Emma S. Gunn, Victor Pineshi, Mariah A. Britt, Joshua Britt, Alycia Grant, Chelsea T. DiBlasi, Jessica Rotter, conducted by Angie Jaree

=== Production ===
- Bob Ludwig – mastering
- Chab (Antoine Chabert) – mastering (album and reissue)
- Cédric Hervet – creative director, cover art
- Warren Fu – cover art, illustrations
- Mick Guzauski – recording, mixing engineer
- Peter Franco – recording engineer
- Florian Lagatta – recording engineer, mastering (reissue)
- Daniel Lerner – digital audio engineer

== Random Access Memories (Drumless Edition) ==
Random Access Memories (Drumless Edition)

Remix album by Daft Punk
- Released: 17 November 2023
- Recorded: 2008–2013
- Genres: Disco; funk; electronic; soft rock; progressive pop
- Length: 74:33
- Labels: Columbia; Legacy
- Producers: Thomas Bangalter; Guy-Manuel de Homem-Christo; Julian Casablancas; Todd Edwards; DJ Falcon

Daft Punk chronology
Random Access Memories (10th Anniversary Edition) (2023)	Random Access Memories (Drumless Edition) (2023)

Singles from Random Access Memories (10th Anniversary Edition)
- 1. "Within (Drumless Edition)" Released: 28 September 2023; 2. "Motherboard (Drumless Edition)" Released: 2023

Professional ratings
Review scores
Source	Rating
Pitchfork	5.4/10

On 28 September 2023, Daft Punk announced another anniversary reissue, a remix album called Random Access Memories (Drumless Edition). It was released on 17 November 2023 and includes the original 13 album tracks without any drum or percussive elements. "Within (Drumless Edition)" and "Motherboard (Drumless Edition)" were released as promotional singles. As with the 10th anniversary reissue, a Dolby Atmos version of the reissue was also released the same day.

Reception to the drumless edition was mixed, with outlets, critics, and fans unsure of the specific purpose of the release, with some speculation it was for DJs and producers to make their own mixes using the album.

== Charts ==
Weekly chart performance for Random Access Memories: 10th Anniversary Edition
Chart (2023)	Peak position
Australian Albums (ARIA)	14
Japanese Albums (Oricon)	20
Japanese Combined Albums (Oricon)	50
New Zealand Albums (RMNZ)	11
Spanish Albums (Promusicae)	8
Swedish Physical Albums (Sverigetopplistan)	4
