= Infinity Repeating (2013 Demo) =

Single by Daft Punk and Julian Casablancas + The Voidz

from the album Random Access Memories (10th Anniversary Edition)
- Released: 12 May 2023
- Recorded: 2010–2012
- Genre: Soft rock; R&B; dance-rock
- Length: 4:00
- Label: Columbia; Legacy
- Songwriters: Thomas Bangalter; Guy-Manuel de Homem-Christo; Julian Casablancas
- Producers: Daft Punk; Julian Casablancas

Daft Punk singles chronology
"GLBTM (Studio Outtakes)" (2023)	"Infinity Repeating (2013 Demo)" (2023)	"Within (Drumless Edition)" (2023)

Music video
- "Infinity Repeating" (2013 Demo) on YouTube

"Infinity Repeating" is a demo written, produced, and performed by French electronic music duo Daft Punk and American musician Julian Casablancas, along with Casablancas' band The Voidz handling additional instrumentation. Included as part of the 10th anniversary edition of Random Access Memories, it was released the same day as the reissue on 12 May 2023. It is considered by Daft Punk to be their "last song ever".

== Production ==
Daft Punk first met Casablancas in 2010 during their work on the soundtrack to Tron: Legacy through their mutual friend Warren Fu. While working on tracks for Random Access Memories, Casablancas heard the instrumental demo for "Infinity Repeating," which Daft Punk said they had no intentions to finish. After Casablancas expressed a desire to write to the song, he recorded vocals thinking that another collaborator like Stevie Wonder might sing in his place.

The song was not included on the original release of the album, but Casablancas revealed the song's existence in several interviews. Casablancas called the song "weird" and "not one tenth as pop-u-licious" as "Instant Crush," his other collaboration with the duo. When describing it, Casablancas said the song was "like four half-steps up, moving as that on cycle, on repeat," saying he thought it was more bizarre than any song that had released on the finished album.

== Release and promotion ==
Backstage after finishing a concert from the Voidz in 2014, Casablancas met with Thomas Bangalter and urged him to release the song. In 2020, Casablancas expressed he had tried to collaborate with Daft Punk again, but that they were not working on music as a duo at the time. On 22 February 2021, Daft Punk announced they had split. Exactly two years later, on 22 February 2023, Daft Punk announced a 10th anniversary edition of Random Access Memories would be released later that year. The track was confirmed to be included in the weeks after the reissue's announcement.

The week before the reissue's release, coordinates and the date of 11 May 2023 appeared in Spotify visualizers for specific songs off the original album, teasing a global event happening in ten cities: Berlin, Buenos Aires, London, Mexico City, New York City, Paris, Santa Monica, São Paulo, Sydney, and Tokyo. Attendees at the ten cities were able to participate in a geolocated scavenger hunt, using Snapchat to reveal Monoliths playing portions of the music video for "Infinity Repeating," along with snippets of the song.

In promotion of the reissue, Daft Punk released an eight-part video series called Memory Tapes, featuring many of the album's collaborators discussing the duo's work, legacy, and split. Casablancas discussed the song and "Instant Crush" in the first episode of the series, saying "Infinity Repeating" was a fitting song to "end Daft Punk on forever," while also joking that the idea was "dramatic" as he did not believe in the permanence of the split.

== Music video ==
Daft Punk approached regular collaborator Warren Fu about directing a video to the song. They gave him creative freedom and recommended using animation as the duo were officially split and thought it would not be right for them to appear in the video themselves. The video for the song premiered on 11 May 2023 at the Centre Pompidou in Paris, France. The video was produced by Partizan in association with Daft Life and features work from dozens of animators from Picnic Studios, H5 Studio, and Light Studios.

The music video and the song are both based on an infinity loop. After showing a circle slowly develop into an animated walk cycle of a humanoid, the humanoid becomes more advanced, self-destructs, and returns to the starting image of a circle. The video contains many references to Daft Punk's previous work. Fu called the project "especially dear" to him, saying: “Like a lot of the robots’ music, I wanted to create something simple and hypnotic on the surface, that reveals more upon repeat listens and viewings.” A four-part video series on the making of the video was released by Partizan and Daft Life in December 2023. The series contains interviews with the animators from the three studios, as well as with director Warren Fu.

The video won the UK Music Video Award for "Best Animation in a Video" at the 2023 ceremonies. The video competed in the music video competition at 2024 SXSW Film & TV Festival. At the 28th Annual Webby Awards, the video won the People's Voice Award for Animation in a General Video.

Collaborator DJ Falcon in an episode of Memory Tapes specifically praised the thematic choice to end Daft Punk with the song and the imagery of the video. He called the duo sampling their favorite artists and ending by working with them a closed loop, stating "there's nothing you can add to this; this is it."
