= Fragments of Time =

2013 song by Daft Punk featuring Todd Edwards

Song by Daft Punk featuring Todd Edwards

from the album Random Access Memories
- Released: 17 May 2013
- Genre: Soft rock; soul
- Length: 4:39
- Label: Columbia
- Songwriters: Thomas Bangalter; Guy-Manuel de Homem-Christo; Todd Imperatrice
- Producers: Daft Punk; Todd Edwards

Audio video
- "Fragments of Time" on YouTube

"Fragments of Time" is a song by the French electronic music duo Daft Punk featuring American musician Todd Edwards. It is the eleventh track on the duo's 2013 album Random Access Memories. The song charted in France and the United States due to digital downloads of the album.

== Background ==
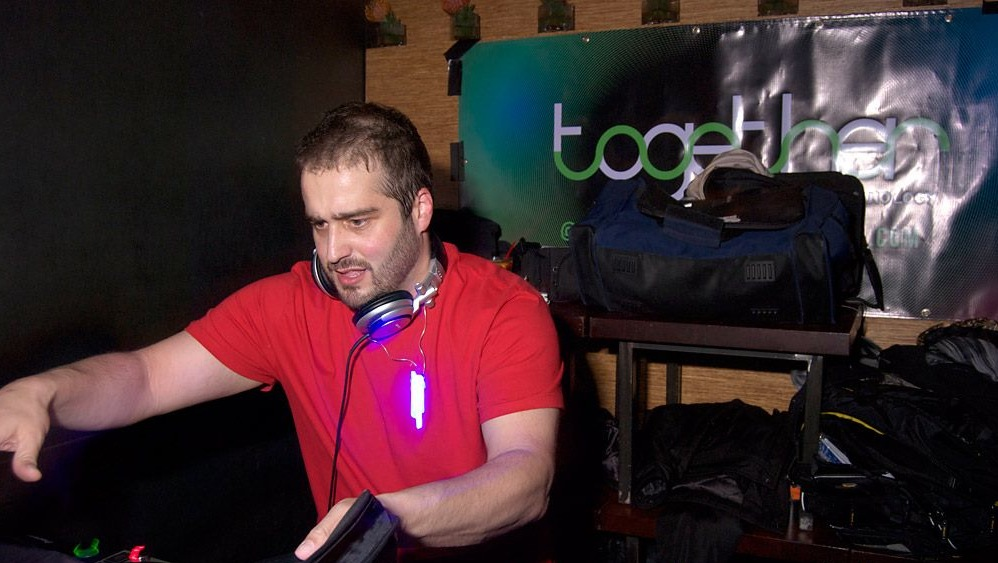
Todd Edwards performed vocals on "Fragments of Time"

Edwards had previously collaborated with Daft Punk to create the song "Face to Face" on the 2001 album Discovery. When he visited the sessions of Random Access Memories in California, the duo were seeking a "west coast vibe" for the album. At the studio, Edwards was asked to implement his signature "cut-up" method of music production for a portion of "Fragments of Time", which ultimately served as the chorus section. Edwards initially thought his production section would be used as an eight-bar break rather than the chorus. Daft Punk was especially grateful to Edwards for his cut-up effects, as the duo felt the song had been lacking in electronic elements. Edwards also recalled that the microphone he sang on for his contribution to the album is "more than my car is worth" and had previously been used by Frank Sinatra.

Much like the rest of the album, "Fragments of Time" incorporates session musicians for most of the instrumentation. Paul Jackson Jr. played rhythm guitar for the song as Chris Caswell and Daft Punk were responsible for the keyboards. Nathan East and James Genus performed on bass while Omar Hakim played drums and Quinn provided percussion. In addition to the lead synthesizer played by Daft Punk, the song includes pedal steel guitar work by Greg Leisz. Daft Punk sought to use the pedal steel in a way that bordered between electronic and acoustic.

== Composition ==
"Fragments of Time" is performed in common time and at a tempo of 130 beats per minute. It is in the key of C Major, and the vocal ranges from G_{3} to A_{4}. Edwards commented that the lyrics were inspired by his desire to capture the moments he experienced during his visit to the duo's studio sessions in California; in particular he desired to stay in the area and to reminisce. More specifically he sings about "the gold and the silver dream", and creating "these random memories". William Goodman of Fuse wrote that "Fragments of Time" is "a total Hall & Oates nod and it's on a road to paradise". Ryan Schreiber of Pitchfork compared the song to the "80s country pop" of Sheena Easton.

== "The Writing of Fragments of Time" ==
"The Writing of Fragments of Time"

Single by Daft Punk featuring Todd Edwards

from the album Random Access Memories (10th Anniversary Edition)
- B-side: "Fragments of Time"
- Released: 22 March 2023
- Genre: Soft rock; soul
- Length: 8:17
- Label: Columbia
- Songwriters: Thomas Bangalter; Guy-Manuel de Homem-Christo; Todd Imperatrice
- Producers: Daft Punk; Todd Edwards

Daft Punk singles chronology
"I Feel It Coming" (2016)	"The Writing of Fragments of Time" (2023)	"GLBTM (Studio Outtakes)" (2023)

Todd Edwards singles chronology
"Thinkin' I'm in Love" (2021)	"The Writing of Fragments of Time" (2023)	"Reckless" (2023)

Music video
- "The Writing of Fragments of Time" (RAM 10th Anniversary) on YouTube

On 22 February 2023, two years after Daft Punk announced their disbandment as a duo, a 10th anniversary edition of Random Access Memories was announced. The anniversary reissue, releasing on 12 May, includes 35 minutes of previously unreleased demos and studio outtakes. One of the bonus tracks, called "The Writing of Fragments of Time" was released on 22 March as the first single from the reissue. The documentary-styled track contains spoken discussions and sung improvisations between Thomas Bangalter and Todd Edwards, as they work on the lyrics and melody of the song. These outtakes were edited and compiled excerpts from a studio session recorded on 29 February 2012. Bangalter and Edwards did not know that the engineers were recording the session at the time. The single was accompanied by a music video directed by Daft Punk's creative director Cédric Hervet.

In an interview with Zane Lowe of Apple Music 1 following the premiere of the track, Edwards said "You’ll hear me laughing because Thomas [Bangalter] came up with some really damn witty lines in it." He also expressed that he was not shocked by the duo's breakup and expressed hope that younger producers would be more willing to follow Daft Punk's example and take risks in the industry.

== Personnel ==
- Daft Punk – synthesizers, keyboards, production, songwriting
- Todd Edwards – vocals, co-production, songwriting
- Paul Jackson Jr. – guitar
- Chris Caswell – keyboards
- Nathan East – bass
- James Genus – bass
- Omar Hakim – drums
- Quinn – percussion

== Chart positions ==
Chart (2013)	Peak position
France (SNEP)	100
Italy (FIMI)	123
UK Streaming (Official Streaming Chart)	30
US Hot Dance/Electronic Songs (Billboard)	28
