= Homework (Daft Punk album) =

1997 studio album by Daft Punk

Studio album by Daft Punk
- Released: 20 January 1997
- Recorded: 1994–1996
- Studio: Daft House (Paris)
- Genres: French house; techno; disco; Chicago house; electropop
- Length: 73:53
- Labels: Virgin; Soma
- Producers: Thomas Bangalter; Guy-Manuel de Homem-Christo

Daft Punk chronology
Homework (1997)	Discovery (2001)

Singles from Homework
- 1. "Da Funk" Released: 8 May 1995; 2. "Indo Silver Club" Released: 26 February 1996; 3. "Around the World" Released: 7 April 1997; 4. "Burnin'" Released: 8 September 1997; 5. "Revolution 909" Released: 16 February 1998

Homework is the debut studio album by the French electronic music duo Daft Punk, released on 20 January 1997 by Virgin Records and Soma Quality Recordings. It was released in the US on 25 March 1997.

Daft Punk received attention from major labels after releasing several popular singles on Soma Quality Recordings, and signed to Virgin in 1996. They initially planned to release the music as separate singles, but decided they had enough material for an album. The title Homework references the album having been recorded in a home studio.

Homework charted in 14 countries, reaching number 3 on the French Albums Chart, number 150 on the US Billboard 200 and number 8 on the UK Albums Chart. "Da Funk" and "Around the World" became U.S. Billboard Hot Dance/Club Play number-one singles, and "Around the World" reached number 61 on the Billboard Hot 100. By February 2001, Homework had sold more than two million copies worldwide and received several gold and platinum certifications. It was influential on dance music and brought worldwide attention to French house.

== Background and recording ==
In 1993, Daft Punk, comprising Thomas Bangalter and Guy-Manuel de Homem-Christo, presented a demo of their music to the DJ Stuart Macmillan at a rave at Disneyland Paris. The contents of the cassette, including the track "Alive", were released on the single "The New Wave" on 11 April 1994, by Soma Quality Recordings, a Scottish techno and house label co-founded in 1991 by MacMillan's band Slam. In 1995, Daft Punk released "Da Funk" and "Rollin' & Scratchin'" on Soma.

We've got much more control than money. You can't get everything. We live in a society where money is what people want, so they can't get the control. We chose. Control is freedom. People say we're control freaks, but control is controlling your destiny without controlling other people.

— Thomas Bangalter

The popularity of the singles led to a bidding war among record labels. Daft Punk signed to Virgin Records in 1996. Richard Brown of Soma said: "We were obviously sad to lose them to Virgin but they had the chance to go big, which they wanted, and it's not very often that a band has that chance after two singles. We're happy for them." Virgin re-released "Da Funk" with the B-side "Musique" in 1996, a year before releasing Homework. Bangalter later said that the B-side "was never intended to be on the album, and in fact, 'Da Funk' as a single has sold more units than Homework, so more people own it anyways [sic] than they would if it had been on the album. It is basically used to make the single a double-feature."

The album was mixed and recorded in Daft Punk's studio, Daft House in Paris. The name Homework came from "the fact that we made the record at home, very cheaply, very quickly, and spontaneously, trying to do cool stuff". It was mastered by Nilesh Patel at the London studio the Exchange.

Bangalter said that "to be free, we had to be in control. To be in control, we had to finance what we were doing ourselves. The main idea was to be free." Daft Punk discussed their method with Spike Jonze, the director of the "Da Funk" music video, who said: "They were doing everything based on how they wanted to do it. As opposed to, 'oh we got signed to this record company, we gotta use their plan.' They wanted to make sure they never had to do anything that would make them feel bummed on making music." Although Virgin Records holds exclusive distribution rights over their material, Daft Punk owns their master recordings through their Daft Trax label.

== Music ==
Daft Punk produced the tracks included in Homework without a plan to release an album. According to Bangalter, "We did so many tracks over a period of five months that we realized that we had a good album." They set the order of the tracks to cover the four sides of a two-disc vinyl LP. Homem-Christo said, "There was no intended theme because all the tracks were recorded before we arranged the sequence of the album. The idea was to make the songs better by arranging them the way we did; to make it more even as an album."

"Alive"
"Alive", first single released from Homework, is the final version recorded of "The New Wave", which was the first song made by Daft Punk.

"Around the World" (LP version)
LP version of "Around the World", third single released from the album. The song carries influences of Gershon Kingsley's hit "Popcorn" while playing over "a post-disco boogie bassline", which serves as the base for a "single, naggingly insistent hook".

"Daftendirekt" is an excerpt of a live performance recorded in Ghent, Belgium. It served as the introduction to Daft Punk's live shows and was used to begin the album. The performance took place at the first I Love Techno, an event co-produced by Fuse and On the Rox on 10 November 1995. Homework's following track, "WDPK 83.7 FM", is a tribute to FM radio in the United States. The next track, "Revolution 909" is a reflection on the French government's stance on dance music.

"Da Funk" carries elements of funk and acid music. According to Andrew Asch of the Boca Raton News, the song's composition "relies on a bouncy funk guitar to communicate its message of dumb fun". It contains a sample of "Bounce, Rock, Skate, Roll", written by Gregory Bufford, Jerome Bell, and Vaughan Mason, and performed by Vaughan Mason & Crew. Bangalter expressed that "Da Funk"'s theme involved the introduction of a simple, unusual element that becomes acceptable and moving over time. Sal Cinquemani of Slant Magazine complimented the song as "unrelenting", and Bob Gajarsky of Consumable Online called it "a beautiful meeting of Chic (circa 'Good Times', sans vocals) and the 90s form of electronica".

"Phoenix" combines elements of gospel music and house music. It contains a sample of "Don't Go Breaking My Heart", written by Elton John and Bernie Taupin, and performed by Elton John and Kiki Dee. The following track, "Fresh" contains a sample of "If You Leave Me Now", written by Peter Cetera, and performed by Viola Wills. Daft Punk considered "Fresh" breezy and light with a comical structure. "Around the World" carries influences of Gershon Kingsley's hit "Popcorn". Chris Power of BBC Music named it "one of the decade's catchiest singles". He stated that it was "a perfect example of Daft Punk's sound at its most accessible: a post-disco boogie bassline, a minimalist sprinkling of synthetic keyboard melody and a single, naggingly insistent hook". "Teachers" is a riff on the Parris Mitchell song "Ghetto Shout Out!!", released in 1995 on Dance Mania. The track is a tribute to several of Daft Punk's house music influences, including future collaborators Romanthony, DJ Sneak and Todd Edwards. "Oh Yeah" features DJ Deelat and DJ Crabbe. "Indo Silver Club" features a sample of "Hot Shot" by Karen Young. "Alive" is the final version of "The New Wave", released as Daft Punk's first single. The final track, "Funk Ad", is a reversed clip of "Da Funk".

== Packaging ==
The artwork for the front cover and inner sleeve was conceived by Daft Punk and photographed by artist and film producer Nicolas Hidiroglou. He met the duo through a connection at Virgin Records, and recalled that it took a week to complete the artwork. Homem-Christo had previously designed the Daft Punk wordmark, which was the basis for the front image of the logo embroidered onto the back of a satin jacket. Variations of the logo would continue to be the front cover image for all of Daft Punk's studio albums until Random Access Memories in 2013.

To create the inner gatefold photo, various items representing track titles were arranged by Bangalter on a table at his home. He noted that many of the pieces reflect Daft Punk's influences, including: a DJ Funk audio cassette; a card with a logo of The Beach Boys; a Kiss tour poster; and a 1970s compilation record featuring Barry Manilow. Other mementos include a token from the Rex Club, the venue in Paris where Daft Punk first performed as DJs. The wall behind the table contains a photo of Homem-Christo singing as part of the duo's first band Darlin', as well as the Darlin' logo next to a portrait of Homem-Christo as a small child.

The black and white image of the duo in the liner notes was photographed by Phillppe Lévy. It was shot during an event in Wisconsin called Even Furthur in 1996, featuring Daft Punk's first live performance in the United States. Additional artwork and the album layout were done by Serge Nicholas.

== Release ==
Homework was released in the US on 25 March 1997. The first single, "Alive", was included as a B-side on the single "The New Wave", released in April 1994. The next single, "Da Funk", was initially released in 1995 by Soma and was rereleased by Virgin Records in January 1997. It was Daft Punk's first number-one single on the Billboard Hot Dance/Club Play chart, and reached number seven on British and French charts. The third single, "Around the World", was Daft Punk's second number-one single on the Billboard Hot Dance/Club Play chart, and reached number 11 in Australia, number five in the United Kingdom and number 61 on the Billboard Hot 100.

The fourth single, "Burnin'", was released in September 1997 and reached number 30 in the UK. The final single, "Revolution 909", was released in February 1998 and reached number 47 in the UK and number 12 on the Billboard Hot Dance/Club Play chart. Prior to its inclusion on Homework, "Indo Silver Club" was released as a single on the Soma Quality Recordings label in two parts. The single lacked an artist credit in the packaging and was thought to have been created by the nonexistent producers Indo Silver Club.

In 1999, Daft Punk released a video collection featuring music videos of tracks and singles from the album under the name of D.A.F.T.: A Story About Dogs, Androids, Firemen and Tomatoes. Although its title derives from the appearances of dogs ("Da Funk" and "Fresh"), androids ("Around the World"), firemen ("Burnin'"), and tomatoes ("Revolution 909") in the videos, a cohesive plot does not connect its episodes.

=== Sales ===
Daft Punk wanted the majority of pressings to be on vinyl, so only 50,000 albums were initially printed in CD format. After its release, production was accelerated to meet demand. Homework was distributed in 35 countries, reaching number 150 on the Billboard 200. It charted on the Australian Albums Chart on 27 April 1997; it remained there for eight weeks and reached number 37. In France, it reached number three and stayed on the chart for 82 weeks. By October 1997, Homework had sold 220,000 copies worldwide. In 1999, it was certified gold in France for selling more than 100,000 copies. On 11 July 2001, it was certified gold in the US for sales of 500,000 copies. According to Virgin Records, two million copies had been sold by February 2001. By September 2007, 605,000 copies had been sold in the US.

== Critical reception ==
Professional ratings
Review scores
Source	Rating
AllMusic	5/5 stars
Encyclopedia of Popular Music	4/5 stars
Entertainment Weekly	B+
The Guardian	4/5 stars
Los Angeles Times	2.5/4 stars
Muzik	10/10
NME	7/10
Pitchfork	7.6/10 (1997); 9.2/10 (2018)
Q	4/5 stars
Slant Magazine	3.5/5 stars

David Browne, writing in Entertainment Weekly, described the "playful, hip-hopping ambient techno" and said Homework was "ideal disco for androids". Darren Gawle of Drop-D Magazine wrote that "Homework is the work of a couple of DJs who sound amateurish at best". Robert Christgau of The Village Voice identified "Da Funk" as a "choice cut", indicating "a good song on an album that isn't worth your time or money". Sal Cinquemani of Slant Magazine wrote that "while a few tracks are more daft than deft", "Da Funk" had inspired acts such as the Avalanches. Sean Cooper of AllMusic called the album "an almost certain classic".

In 2003, Pitchfork named Homework the 65th-greatest album of the 1990s. In the 2004 Rolling Stone Album Guide, Douglas Wolk awarded Homework three out of five, writing that "the duo's essential, career-defining insight is that the problem with disco the first time around was not that it was stupid but that it was not stupid enough". In the 2005 book 1001 Albums You Must Hear Before You Die, Alex Rayner wrote that Homework tied established club styles to the "burgeoning eclecticism" of big beat, and demonstrated that "there was more to dance music than pills and keyboard presets". Ian Mathers of Stylus Magazine wrote: "There's a core of unimpeachably classic work on Homework, hidden among the merely good, and when you've got such a classic debut hidden in the outlines of the epic slouch of their debut, it's hard not to get frustrated."

In 2009, Brian Linder of IGN said Homework was "groundbreaking achievement", praising the combination of house, techno, acid and punk. Reviewing it in 2010 for BBC Music, Chris Power compared Homework's "less-is-more" use of compression as "a sonic tribute" to the FM radio stations that "fed Daft Punk's youthful obsessions". In 2011, Hua Hsu of eMusic praised the "feeling of discovery and exploration" as a result of "years of careful study of the finest house, techno, electro and hip-hop records". That October, NME named "Around the World" the 21st-best track of the preceding 15 years. In 2012, Clash described Homework as an entry point of accessibility for a "burgeoning movement on the cusp of splitting the mainstream seam".

In 2012, Rolling Stone named Homework the greatest EDM album of all time, describing it as "pure synapse-tweaking brilliance". In a second review for Pitchfork, in 2018, Larry Fitzmaurice awarded it 9.2 out of 10, writing: "Homework remains singular within Daft Punk's catalog, the record also set the stage for the duo's career to this very day—a massively successful and still-going ascent to pop iconography, built on the magic trick-esque ability to twist the shapes of dance music's past to resemble something seemingly futuristic." Homework's success brought worldwide attention to French house music. According to Scott Woods of The Village Voice, the album revived house music and departed from the Eurodance formula, and "[tore] the lid off the [creative] sewer".

== 25th Anniversary Edition ==
On 22 February 2022, one year after their breakup, Daft Punk updated their social media channels with cryptic posts leading fans to a newly created Twitch account. At 2:22pm UTC, a one-time only stream began of the duo's full Daftendirektour performance at the Mayan Theater. At the same time, Daft Punk released an expanded 25th-anniversary edition of Homework. It includes remixes from DJ Sneak, Masters at Work, Todd Terry, Motorbass, Slam and Ian Pooley. The remixes were also simultaneously released as a separate remix album, Homework (Remixes), with a physical release on 25 November 2022.

== Track listing ==
All music is composed by Thomas Bangalter and Guy-Manuel de Homem-Christo.

No.	Title	Length
1.	"Daftendirekt"	2:45
2.	"WDPK 83.7 FM"	0:28
3.	"Revolution 909"	5:26
4.	"Da Funk"	5:30
5.	"Phoenix"	4:57
6.	"Fresh"	4:03
7.	"Around the World"	7:10
8.	"Rollin' & Scratchin'"	7:28
9.	"Teachers"	2:53
10.	"High Fidelity"	6:03
11.	"Rock'n Roll"	7:33
12.	"Oh Yeah"	2:03
13.	"Burnin'"	6:53
14.	"Indo Silver Club"	4:35
15.	"Alive"	5:15
16.	"Funk Ad"	0:51
Total length:		73:53

== Personnel ==
Personnel taken from Homework liner notes.

Daft Punk

- Thomas Bangalter – performance, production, sleeve concept, art direction
- Guy-Manuel de Homem-Christo – performance, production, sleeve concept, art direction

Additional personnel

- Nilesh "Nilz" Patel – mastering
- Nicclas Hidiroglou – cover, satin & vintage central photograph
- Philippe Lévy – black and white live photograph
- Serge Nicclas – album layout & additional artwork

== Charts ==
=== Weekly charts ===
Chart (1997)	Peak position
Australian Albums (ARIA)	37
Austrian Albums (Ö3 Austria)	34
Belgian Albums (Ultratop Flanders)	7
Belgian Albums (Ultratop Wallonia)	9
Canadian Albums (Billboard)	15
Dutch Albums (Album Top 100)	25
Finnish Albums (Suomen virallinen lista)	34
French Albums (SNEP)	3
German Albums (Offizielle Top 100)	48
Italian Albums (FIMI)	19
New Zealand Albums (RMNZ)	8
Norwegian Albums (VG-lista)	40
Scottish Albums (Official Charts)	6
Swedish Albums (Sverigetopplistan)	16
UK Albums (Official Charts)	8
US Billboard 200	150
US Heatseekers Albums (Billboard)	5

Chart (2002)	Peak position
Irish Albums (IRMA)	54

Chart (2013)	Peak position
US Top Catalog Albums (Billboard)	42

Chart (2021)	Peak position
Croatian International Albums (HDU)	21
German Albums (Offizielle Top 100)	44
Swiss Albums (Schweizer Hitparade)	43
UK Dance Albums (Official Charts)	6
US Top Dance Albums (Billboard)	9

Chart (2022)	Peak position
Swiss Albums (Schweizer Hitparade)	33
UK Independent Albums (Official Charts)	8

Chart (2024)	Peak position
Argentine Albums (CAPIF)	3

=== Year-end charts ===
Chart (1997)	Position
Belgian Albums (Ultratop Flanders)	38
Belgian Albums (Ultratop Wallonia)	38
Canadian Albums (Nielsen Soundscan)	43
Dutch Albums (Album Top 100)	95
European Albums (Music & Media)	68
French Albums (SNEP)	24
New Zealand Albums (RMNZ)	22

== Certifications and sales ==
Region	Certification	Certified units/sales
Belgium (BRMA)	Platinum	50,000^{*}
Canada (Music Canada)	2× Platinum	200,000^{^}
France (SNEP)	Platinum	500,000
Netherlands (NVPI)	Gold	50,000^{^}
New Zealand (RMNZ)	Platinum	15,000^{^}
United Kingdom (BPI)	Platinum	345,009
United States (RIAA)	Gold	674,000
^{*} Sales figures based on certification alone.^{^} Shipments figures based on certification alone.
