= Give Life Back to Music =

2014 single by Daft Punk

Single by Daft Punk

from the album Random Access Memories
- Released: 31 January 2014
- Recorded: 2011–2012
- Genre: Disco; funk
- Length: 4:35
- Label: Columbia
- Songwriters: Thomas Bangalter; Guy-Manuel de Homem-Christo; Paul Jackson Jr.; Nile Rodgers
- Producer: Daft Punk

Daft Punk singles chronology
"Instant Crush" (2013)	"Give Life Back to Music" (2014)	"Starboy" (2016)

Audio video
- "Give Life Back to Music" on YouTube

"Give Life Back to Music" is a song by the French electronic music duo Daft Punk from their fourth studio album, Random Access Memories (2013). It is the opening track on the duo's album. The song features lyrics performed by Daft Punk using vocoders. "Give Life Back to Music" also features album collaborators Nile Rodgers on guitar and Chilly Gonzales on keyboards.

The song includes guitar work by Paul Jackson Jr. and additional keyboards by Chris Caswell, with drums by John "J.R." Robinson and bass by Nathan East. The song was distributed to radio stations on 31 January 2014 as the album's fifth overall single and the final single from the album in 2014. Before this, it charted in France, Sweden, Switzerland, the United States, and the United Kingdom.

== Background ==
Nile Rodgers commented that a collaboration was "something we've [Daft Punk and Rodgers] talked about for a long time. We've respected each other endlessly." He had first met with the duo at a "Daft-Punk-listening party" in New York City several years ago and noted that a series of near misses and scheduling conflicts had delayed their chance of collaborating ever since then. Daft Punk later visited Rodgers' home for an informal jam session, which led to an official collaboration. The duo eventually invited Rodgers to the Random Access Memories sessions at Electric Lady Studios in New York City, which was coincidentally the studio where the first Chic single had been recorded, and also located in the neighborhood where Rodgers grew up. He expressed that working with Daft Punk "[felt] like [...] working with contemporaries" and that they motivated each other to excel when collaborating on the album. He remarked that the duo's style has evolved whilst simultaneously exploring music's past, expressing that "they went back to go forward."

Most of the vocal sessions for the album took place in Paris, whereas the rhythm sections were recorded in the United States. Sound effects were newly recorded with the help of film experts from Warner Bros. When asked which of the two Daft Punk members performed the robotic vocals on the album, Bangalter expressed that it did not matter. The duo produced most of the vocoder tracks in their own private studio in Paris, with later processing done by Mick Guzauski at Capitol Studios. Giorgio Moroder elaborated that Daft Punk would take "a week or so" to find an adequate vocoder sound, and an additional few days to record the lyrics.

Gonzales, who played keyboards for "Give Life Back to Music", stated in an interview that his contribution to the album was recorded in a one-day session: "I played for hours and they’re gonna grab what they grab and turn it into whatever." He explained that Daft Punk prompted him at the piano in the same manner that a film director coaches an actor, and Gonzales left the Los Angeles studio without knowledge of what the final product would sound like. He later elaborated on the filmmaking analogy by saying that his presence on the album was the equivalent of a cameo appearance rather than a lead role, and that "it requires a great film director such as Daft Punk to use the person properly." Gonzales previously recorded a cover version of Daft Punk's song "Too Long" that appeared on the 2003 album Daft Club.

In June 2013, an unofficial remix of "Give Life Back to Music" was released by producer Nicolas Jaar and musician Dave Harrington of the band Darkside, as part of their remix album Daftside. Jaar had previously released remixes of tracks by Grizzly Bear and Brian Eno.

== "GLBTM (Studio Outtakes)" ==
"GLBTM (Studio Outtakes)"

Single by Daft Punk

from the album Random Access Memories (10th Anniversary Edition)
- Released: April 20, 2023
- Genre: Disco
- Length: 6:21
- Label: Columbia
- Songwriters: Thomas Bangalter; Guy-Manuel de Homem-Christo; Paul Jackson Jr.; Nile Rodgers
- Producer: Daft Punk

Daft Punk singles chronology
"The Writing of Fragments of Time" (2023)	"GLBTM (Studio Outtakes)" (2023)	"Infinity Repeating (2013 Demo)" (2023)

Audio video
- "GLBTM" (Studio Outtakes) on YouTube

On 22 February 2023, exactly two years after their split, Daft Punk announced a 10th anniversary edition of Random Access Memories. The reissue includes an early version of "Give Life Back to Music" called "GLBTM (Studio Outtakes)," which was released as the second single from the release. The track features studio recordings by Gonzales and other studio musicians. The official press release described the song as a look at "multiple versions of what the song could have evolved into."

== Composition ==
"Give Life Back To Music"
"Give Life Back to Music" is the first song on the album and features Nile Rodgers on guitar, using live instruments during the recording process.

"Give Life Back to Music" features guitar work by Nile Rodgers and Paul Jackson Jr., drums by John "J.R." Robinson, and lyrics performed by Daft Punk using vocoders. The song reflects the duo's goal to create a light yet polished and elegant record. Pedal steel guitar work on the record was performed by Greg Leisz. Daft Punk sought to use the instrument in a way that bordered between electronic and acoustic. As stated by NME, the album begins with "a stupendously vast rock intro that obliterates any trace of Human After All's brittle techno". Regarding the lyrical content, Thomas Bangalter felt that the song's message is open to interpretation and that "The way it’s sung [...] it’s an optimistic statement. And it's got a certain innocence that the ‘70s were filled with. No cynicism of any kind." Guy-Manuel de Homem Christo nevertheless acknowledged that listeners could interpret the lyrics as being pretentious, and that he personally felt that mainstream music has lost depth in recent years.

== Personnel ==
- Daft Punk – production, vocals, modular synthesizer
- Chilly Gonzales – keyboards
- Paul Jackson Jr. – guitar
- Nile Rodgers – guitar
- Greg Leisz – pedal steel guitar
- Chris Caswell – keyboards
- Nathan East – bass
- John "JR" Robinson – drums
- Quinn – percussion

== Charts ==
=== Weekly ===
Chart (2013–14)	Peak position
Belgium (Ultratip Bubbling Under Flanders)	2
Belgium Dance (Ultratop Flanders)	16
Belgium (Ultratip Bubbling Under Wallonia)	12
Belgium Dance (Ultratop Wallonia)	26
Denmark Bit Track (Tracklisten)	12
France (SNEP)	23
Italy (FIMI)	77
Japan Hot 100 (Billboard)	77
Japan (Hot Overseas)	15
South Korea (Gaon International Chart)	2
Sweden (Sverigetopplistan)	26
Switzerland (Schweizer Hitparade)	58
US Bubbling Under Hot 100 (Billboard)	13
US Hot Dance/Electronic Songs (Billboard)	18
US Dance Club Songs (Billboard)	9

=== Year-end ===
Chart (2013)	Position
South Korea (Gaon International Chart)	151
US Dance/Electronic Songs (Billboard)	51

== Release history ==
Country	Date	Radio format	Label
Italy	31 January 2014	Contemporary hit radio	Sony
United States	4 February 2014	Contemporary hit radio	Columbia
