= Revolution 909 =

1998 single by Daft Punk

Single by Daft Punk

from the album Homework
- Released: 16 February 1998
- Genre: French house; deep house
- Length: 5:24 (album version); 3:45 (radio edit)
- Label: Virgin
- Songwriters: Thomas Bangalter; Guy-Manuel de Homem-Christo
- Producer: Daft Punk

Daft Punk singles chronology
"Burnin'" (1997)	"Revolution 909" (1998)	"One More Time" (2000)

Music video
- "Revolution 909" on YouTube

"Revolution 909" is an instrumental track from the French electronic music duo Daft Punk's debut album, Homework (1997). The song was released by Virgin Records as the fifth and final single from the album on 16 February 1998. The music video for the track was directed by Roman Coppola.

== Theme ==
The opening skit in "Revolution 909" is said to be a reflection on the French government and its stance against rave parties. When asked on the motivations of the stance, Bangalter said:

I don't think it's the music they're after, it's the parties... I don't know. They pretend it's drugs, but I don't think it's the only thing. There's drugs everywhere, but they probably wouldn't have a problem if the same thing was going on at a rock concert, because that's what they understand. They don't understand this music which is really violent and repetitive, which is house; they consider it dumb and stupid.

== Critical reception ==
Alan Jones from Music Week "With Air flying high, France's last big thing, Daft Punk, return with "Revolution 909", another endearing and idiosyncratic piece of disco funk, complete with phasing and other effects, including one which makes it sound like it's being played in a bedroom next door. Remixed to perfection by Roger Sanchez, it has a fat and irresistibly bouncy sound that is likely to earn it a place in the Top 10." Andy Beevers from Record Mirror gave it four out of five, adding, "This stomping flange- and filter-fest has been one of the club favourites from the Homework LP."

== Music video ==
The accompanying music video for the track shows a rave taking place in an alley. Police officers suddenly arrive to break up the party. While several people are rounded up, a young woman who looks to be captured notices a stain on an officer's shirt. This triggers a flashback beginning with a tomato seed being planted, then sprouting, then harvested and then packaged. The packages are eventually transported to a grocery store where a lady selects the tomatoes to take home with her. As she is preparing tomato sauce, subtitles accurately instruct the viewer on the recipe for making the sauce for spaghetti. The lady places the prepared meal into a tupperware container. The officer from earlier in the video appears with the meal in his squad car. He spills the tomato sauce onto his shirt while eating it and creates the stain. This brings the flashback to the beginning of the video. When the officer looks down at his stained shirt and is distracted, the young woman gains the opportunity to flee. Someone appears on a platform above and pulls her to safety.

The music video is featured in D.A.F.T., a collection of videos from Homework. It is also available on the limited edition CD and DVD of Musique Vol. 1 1993–2005. Roman Coppola's audio commentary for "Revolution 909" in D.A.F.T. mentions friends of his who saw the video and noticed a person resembling Thomas Bangalter. He would not confirm if it was Bangalter or not. Coppola also refers to the video as the "tomato video". He stated that he used the tomato setting because he had always wanted to produce an instructional video.

== Track listing ==
12" Maxi-single (VISA 8228)
No.	Title	Length
1.	"Revolution 909"	5:24
2.	"Revolution 909" (Roger and Junior's Revolutionary War mix)	8:55
3.	"Revolution 909" (a cappella)	1:03
Total length:		15:22

CD-Maxi (Virgin 8948212)
No.	Title	Length
1.	"Revolution 909" (radio edit)	3:45
2.	"Revolution 909" (Roger & Junior's Revolutionary War mix)	8:55
3.	"Revolution 909" (a cappella)	1:03
4.	"Revolution 909"	5:24
Total length:		19:07

== Charts ==
Chart performance for "Revolution 909"
Chart (1998)	Peak position
Australia (ARIA)	162
Belgium (Ultratop 50 Flanders)	50
France (SNEP)	50
UK Singles (Official Charts)	47
US Dance Club Songs (Billboard)	12
