= Todd Edwards =

American musician

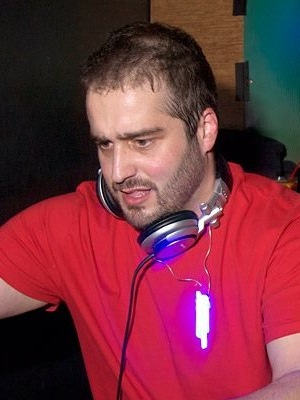
- Edwards in 2012

Background information
- Born: Todd Edward Imperatrice; December 9, 1972 (age 53); Bloomfield, New Jersey, U.S.
- Genres: Garage house; speed garage; UK garage
- Occupations: Record producer; DJ; singer; songwriter
- Instruments: Digital audio workstation; turntable; MIDI keyboard
- Years active: 1992–2007; 2013–present
- Labels: Nervous; i!; Defected
- Website: toddedwardsmusic.com

Todd Edward Imperatrice (born December 9, 1972), known professionally as Todd Edwards, is an American garage house record producer, DJ, and singer. Nicknamed "Todd the God" and known by various aliases throughout his career, he has been credited as a significant influence on electronic music. He inspired the French house duo Daft Punk and played a role in the creation of the UK garage genre.

Edwards began his career producing primarily for New York's Nervous Records in the 1990s, including under aliases such as the Messenger and the Sample Choir. Beginning with his 1993 single "Guide My Soul", Edwards helped pioneer the speed garage genre. His 1994 single "Saved My Life" became a club hit in the UK.

Edwards has remixed hundreds of artists, including Wildchild, St Germain, Benjamin Diamond, Justice, Klaxons and Dimitri from Paris. Edwards has collaborated with Daft Punk on two successful songs, co-producing and contributing vocals on the songs "Face to Face" (2001) and "Fragments of Time" (2013); the former reached number one on the Billboard Dance Club Songs chart in 2004, while the latter won him a Grammy Award for its inclusion on Random Access Memories, which won Album of the Year at the 2014 show.

== Early life and education ==
Todd Edward Imperatrice was born on December 9, 1972, in Bloomfield, New Jersey. His father worked as a carpet salesman, while his mother became a receptionist at Lincoln Technical Institute when he was in seventh grade. His father would exercise in the house in the morning to Neil Diamond albums. Imperatrice was into science fiction, enjoying things like Star Wars and The Six Million Dollar Man. He has an older sister who influenced his listening habits by playing disco music. The first record he bought was Peter Brown’s "Dance With Me".

== Music career ==
=== 1992–2007: Early career and successes ===
Edwards began his music career in 1992. He became known for his use of vocal reconstruction techniques, which involve chopping, layering, and rearranging vocal samples to create complex collages over four-on-the-floor beats. This approach was inspired by producer Marc "MK" Kinchen. In 1995, his manager was approached by French producer St Germain, who requested Edwards to remix his song "Alabama Blues". Edwards's two remixes of the track led to his breakthrough and became some of his most famous works.

In the late 1990s, Edwards connected with the electronic duo Daft Punk, who attempted to collaborate with him on their album Homework. Although a collaboration didn't materialize due to their then-unknown status, they acknowledged him in their song "Teachers" on the album. In 1999, he reconnected with Daft Punk, resulting in the creation of the song "Face to Face," where he co-produced and performed the vocals. The song was included in the 2001 album Discovery and later released as a promotional single two years later, reaching number 1 on the Billboard Dance Club Songs chart in 2004.

On January 1, 2003, EZ booked Edwards to play at the nightclub at Time & Envy in Romford, England, during EZ's 4by4 sets. Edwards, who had previously declined to play in the United Kingdom despite his music's popularity there, later explained that he had never really DJ'd in a club before. His set was captured on camera, and DJ Mag noted that it has been "constantly regurgitated by various music platforms on social media," including a misunderstanding between Edwards and the MC when the MC asked for a rewind during the set.

=== 2007–2010: Retiring from music ===
After working with Daft Punk on "Face to Face," Edwards became burnt out on music and quit the scene entirely. During this period, Edwards experienced depression and felt he had no coping mechanisms, as mental health wasn't widely discussed. He described himself as a workaholic with depressive mood swings and went through an existential crisis. He took a nine-to-five job in customer service with Verizon in order to make money, a role he later described as making him feel like he was "dying a little inside each day." However, at the height of the Great Recession, he quit the job and decided to return to music. Edwards later described his manager as a "very negative reinforcement type of guy" during this time, saying that the manager would re-release one of Edwards's tracks every time Edwards released a new one, seemingly out of spite. The manager also kept Edwards from connecting with his fans. Seeking support, Edwards reached out to EZ and Pedro Winter, Daft Punk's manager at the time. Upon learning that Edwards didn't own his catalogue, they urged him to buy it back.

=== 2010–present: Return and resurgence ===
After deciding to return to music, Edwards sent an email to Thomas Bangalter of Daft Punk to congratulate him and Guy-Manuel de Homem-Christo on their 2010 album Tron: Legacy. Bangalter responded by asking if they could work with him again, mentioning that Edwards was one of their favorites. Edwards collaborated with Daft Punk and co-wrote the song "Fragments of Time," which was featured on their 2013 album Random Access Memories, later stating that the collaborating was "life-changing". In 2019, Edwards achieved his first number-one spot on Billboard's Dance Club Songs chart with his single "You're Sorry."

In April 2020, London-based house label Defected Records announced that they had acquired Edwards's catalogue, most of which had previously been available exclusively on physical mediums such as vinyl and CDs. In May 2021, Edwards and Defected Records announced that his back catalogue would be available digitally for the first time, with remastered releases, remixes, and previously unreleased songs. Speaking about the remasters, he said that it had "been almost a decade since [he] got back the music catalog" and that Defected was the perfect label to share his music with both an old and new audience.

On March 22, 2023, a bonus track from the 10th anniversary edition of Random Access Memories titled "The Writing of Fragments of Time" was released. The single is an eight-minute track consisting of multiple spoken discussions and sung improvisations between Thomas Bangalter and Todd Edwards as they work on the lyrics and melody of the song. That same year, Edwards was featured in a documentary released by Daft Punk titled Memory Tapes.

== Artistry ==
"Alabama Blues (Todd Edwards Dub Mix)"
The ending segment of his dub remix of "Alabama Blues", showing his sampling technique.

Edwards's style of music production features four-on-the-floor swing beats and is characterized by vocal samples cut into tiny fragments and reassembled. Writing for The Wire, Simon Reynolds described his style as "cross-hatching brief snatches of vocals into a melodic-percussive honeycomb of blissful hiccups." His earlier records were heavily inspired by other house music producers such as Todd Terry, Masters at Work and MK.

Over time, Edwards began developing his own style, with his techniques of chopping samples becoming an early characteristic of speed garage and later 2-step garage. In separate interviews about his favorite tracks, he included songs by Roy Davis Jr., TJR, Armand van Helden, and other artists from the US and UK garage scenes.

Edwards's remix of St Germain's "Alabama Blues" was included in Pitchfork's list of the top 30 best house tracks of the 1990s. Ben Cardew described Edwards's technique as a refinement of MK's style, calling it a "buoyantly rhythmic and geometrically patterned mosaic," which served as an inspiration for Daft Punk. The remixes have also been featured on The Guardian's list of the best UK garage tracks, ranking at number 16, and on Rolling Stone's top 200 Greatest Dance Songs of All Time, ranking at number 138.

== Personal life ==
Edwards currently resides in Los Angeles, where he relocated in 2013 following his work on Random Access Memories. He has two rabbits named Anubis and Q-Tip. Edwards began a romantic relationship with singer-songwriter Michael Horgan, also known as Mystic Aytch, after the two attended Daft Punk's Grammy party in 2014. Horgan released his debut single "Herbology" with Edwards in 2023. In February 2025, he announced their engagement on Instagram before a show in Paris.

Todd Edwards became a committed Christian in the 1990s after he had negative experiences with religion during his youth. His faith is subtly reflected in his music, as many of his compositions include hidden messages and vocal samples containing religious phrases, often layered within his signature production style. In a 2021 interview with The Guardian, Edwards revealed that he had been experiencing a crisis of faith, admitting "Me and God are seeing other people right now, that’s what I say. I just try to practice the good things from Christianity. [...] I have to confess: sorry, I’m struggling with it." In a 2025 interview for Buds Digest, Edwards expressed that he identified as a "deconstructed Christian"; further, he required therapy to help him accept himself.

== Discography ==
- Prima Edizione (1999)
- Full On (Volume 1) (2001)
- Full On (Volume 2) (2003)
- Odyssey (2006)
- Full On (Volume 3) (2007)
