= Burnin' (instrumental) =

1997 song by Daft Punk

Single by Daft Punk

from the album Homework
- Released: 8 September 1997
- Genre: Chicago house
- Length: 6:53 (album version); 3:48 (edit version)
- Label: Virgin
- Songwriters: Thomas Bangalter; Guy-Manuel de Homem-Christo
- Producer: Daft Punk

Daft Punk singles chronology
"Around the World" (1997)	"Burnin'" (1997)	"Revolution 909" (1998)

Music video
- "Burnin'" on YouTube

"Burnin'" is an instrumental track from French electronic music duo Daft Punk's debut album, Homework (1997). It was the fourth single released from the album on 8 September 1997. The music video for the track was directed by French photographer and video director Seb Janiak.

== Critical reception ==
British magazine Music Week rated the song three out of five, adding, "A more minimal, scratchy groove than Da Funk or Around The World, the duo's third single for Virgin is nevertheless funky, and the Towering Inferno-style video should help exposure."

The song later had a remix entitled "Extravaganza", created by Korean band BanYa for the dance video game Pump It Up. Elements of "Burnin'" were combined with the song "Too Long" in Daft Punk's live album Alive 2007.

== Music video ==
The music video for "Burnin'" pays tribute to Chicago house producers that Daft Punk found inspiration in. The party scene in the video features DJ Sneak, Roger Sanchez, Derrick Carter, Roy Davis Jr., Paul Johnson, Robert Armani and DJ Hyperactive. Thomas Bangalter and Guy-Manuel de Homem-Christo of Daft Punk also make brief cameo appearances in the video as people at the party; Bangalter wears sunglasses and a long-haired, dark wig, while de Homem-Chisto appears in a purple suit, sunglasses and blonde wig. The video was shot in Chicago using an office building at One South Wacker Drive as the setting.

The video begins with a boy playing with a toy fire truck in a suburb while his father cooks steak on a barbecue. The scene oscillates from this setting to a party scene within a skyscraper, in which a fire spreads while nobody at the party seems to notice. A team of firefighters eventually alert the party attendants of the fire and escort them from the building. It is suggested that the boy and his fire truck are somehow connected to the firefighter rescue and evacuation in the video.

== Track listing ==
12" maxi (Virgin VISA 8197)

Side A
No.	Title	Length
1.	"Burnin'" (Ian Pooley "Cut Up" Mix)	5:20
2.	"Burnin'" (Slam Mix)	6:48
3.	"Burnin'" (Original Mix)	6:53

Side B
No.	Title	Length
4.	"Burnin'" (DJ Sneak "Mongowarrior" Mix)	10:22
5.	"Burnin'" (DJ Sneak Main Mix)	9:10
Total length:		38:33

CD maxi (Virgin 7243 8 94551 2 0)

No.	Title	Length
1.	"Burnin'" (Edit Version)	3:48
2.	"Burnin'" (Ian Pooley "Cut Up" Mix)	5:20
3.	"Burnin'" (Slam Mix)	6:48
4.	"Burnin'" (Original Mix)	6:53
Total length:		22:49

== Charts ==
Weekly chart performance for "Burnin'"
Chart (1997)	Peak position
Australia (ARIA)	151
Belgium (Ultratip Bubbling Under Flanders)	6
Belgium (Ultratop 50 Wallonia)	38
Canada (RPM Dance)	12
Finland (Suomen virallinen lista)	20
France (SNEP)	29
Italy (FIMI)	7
UK Singles (Official Charts)	30
