= Around the World (Daft Punk song) =

1997 single by Daft Punk

Single by Daft Punk

from the album Homework
- Released: 7 April 1997
- Genre: French house; funk; disco; dance
- Length: 7:09 (album version); 4:01 (radio edit)
- Label: Virgin
- Songwriters: Thomas Bangalter; Guy-Manuel de Homem-Christo
- Producer: Daft Punk

Daft Punk singles chronology
"Indo Silver Club" (1996)	"Around the World" (1997)	"Burnin'" (1997)

Audio sample
- Daft Punk – "Around the World" (LP version): file; help

Music video
- "Around the World" on YouTube

"Around the World" is a song by French electronic music duo Daft Punk. The song was written and released on April 1997 by Virgin as the second single from their debut studio album, Homework (1997). The song became a major club hit globally and reached number one on the dance charts in Canada, Spain, the United Kingdom, and the United States. It also peaked at number one in Iceland and Italy. The song's lyrics solely consist of the words "around the world", repeated on loop for a total of 144 times in the album version. The music video was directed by Michel Gondry, produced by Midi Minuit and choreographed by Blanca Li. In 2011, NME placed it at number 21 on its list "150 Best Tracks of the Past 15 Years", and in 2025, Billboard magazine ranked it among "The 100 Best Dance Songs of All Time".

== Composition ==
The key hook is a steady bassline and a robotic voice singing "around the world" in continuous chains. Daft Punk recalled that the song "was like making a Chic record with a talk box and just playing the bass on the synthesizer". The phrase occurs 144 times in the album version and 80 times in the radio edit. It is composed in the key of E minor and a tempo of 121.3 BPM.

Upon analysis of the song, Michel Gondry noted its distinctive structure: "I realized how genius and simple the music was. Only five different instruments, with very few patterns, each to create numerous possibilities of figures. Always using the repetition, and stopping just before it's too much." He also noted the similarity between the bassline of "Around the World" and that of the Chic song "Good Times". In 2017, computer scientist Colin Morris analyzed 15,000 Billboard Hot 100 hits for repetitiveness, based on compression algorithms. "Around the World" was found to be the most repetitive of the songs analyzed.

A cover version of "Around the World" was released in 2006 as "Around the World Again" by Nicky Van She and Dangerous Dan. A remix of the will.i.am song "I Got It from My Mama" included a sample from "Around the World", but Daft Punk did not approve use of the sample, and subsequently refused will.i.am permission to release the remix. A music video was produced with the sample included, however. A song titled "Around the World" was released by rapper P.M. that contains a sample of Daft Punk's. Señor Coconut released a cover of "Around the World" on his 2008 album, Atom™ presents: Around the World with Señor Coconut and his Orchestra.

"Around the World" was featured in one episode of the first season of the MTV animated series Daria. It was also used in the video games Dance Central 3, NBA 2K13 and the trailers for Ubisoft E3 2007 Rayman Raving Rabbids 2.

== Critical reception ==
In a retrospective review, Rayna Khaitan from Albumism noted "all its axon-activating joy". She added further, "Indulgently repetitious, echoing the phrase “around the world” precisely 144 times like some soothing vocoded mantra, the song rallies the collective as together we teetered toward the turn of the millennium." Larry Flick from Billboard magazine wrote that with this "tasty slice of disco/funk, dynamic electronica outfit Daft Punk looks well positioned to build upon the momentum generated by its recent breakthrough hit, 'Da Funk'". He noted that the group "does an exemplary job of communicating a hum-along chorus without the aid of a vocalist, opting instead for a stream of caustic key-boards and blippy sound effects". Another American music magazine, Blender put "Around the World" at 172nd place on their list of "500 Greatest Songs Since You Were Born" in 2007. They wrote,

This bubblegum robo-disco mantra was the song that made LCD Soundsystem's James Murphy fantasize about Daft Punk playing at his house. "I liked how wimpy 'Around the World' was," he explains. "It was really everything I hated, and I couldn't resist it. What a fucking track." Recorded in a bedroom, and boosted by director Michel Gondry's freaky-dancing video clip, "Around the World" made Paris hip again and left house music hooked on retro."

A writer from Complex stated that "its simplicity made it one of the most catchy", and also noted the "unforgettable" music video, "with all kinds of creatures frolicking around a colorful stage." Andy Beevers from Music Week's RM rated "Around the World" five out of five, picking it as Tune of the Week. He added that it "brings together the punchiest of boogie basslines, trademark crunchy beats, chirpy synths and the vocodored up title line that is repeated ad nauseum [sic] just in case you should forget which tune you're listening to."

Tomorrowland included "Around the World" in their official list of "The Ibiza 500" in 2020. In March 2025, Billboard magazine ranked it number 78 in their list of "The 100 Best Dance Songs of All Time".

=== Accolades ===
Year	Publisher	Country	Accolade	Rank
2005	Blender	United States	"500 Greatest Songs Since You Were Born"	172
2005	Stylus Magazine	United States	"Top 50 Bassline of All Time"	25
2007	Treblezine	United States	"Top 100 Singles of the '90s"	37
2011	MTV Dance	United Kingdom	"The 100 Biggest 90's Dance Anthems of All Time"	7
2011	NME	United Kingdom	"150 Best Tracks of the Past 15 Years"	21
2012	NME	United Kingdom	"100 Best Songs of the 1990s"	37
2012	Porcys	Poland	"100 Singli 1990-1999"	11
2013	Complex	United States	"The 15 Best Songs from the Electronica Era"	*
2013	Max	Australia	"1000 Greatest Songs of All Time"	365
2013	Vibe	United States	"Before EDM: 30 Dance Tracks from the '90s That Changed the Game"	1
2015	Robert Dimery	United States	"1,001 Songs You Must Hear Before You Die, and 10,001 You Must Download (2015 Update)"	*
2017	Billboard	United States	"The 100 Greatest Pop Songs of 1997"	8
2017	BuzzFeed	United States	"The 101 Greatest Dance Songs of the '90s"	29
2018	Max	Australia	"1000 Greatest Songs of All Time"	517
2019	Rolling Stone	United States	"50 Best Songs of the Nineties"	27
2022	Pitchfork	United States	"The 30 Best House Tracks of the ’90s"	*
2022	Pitchfork	United States	"The 250 Best Songs of the 1990s"	11
2024	Esquire	United States	"The 50 Best Songs of the '90s"	5
2024	Sveriges Radio P3	Sweden	"P300 – Världens 300 bästa låtar"	283
2025	Billboard	United States	"The 100 Best Dance Songs of All Time"	78

(*) indicates the list is unordered.

== Music video ==
Michel Gondry's music video for the song features five groups of characters on a platform representing a vinyl record: four robots walking around in a circle, four tall athletes (as described by Gondry) wearing tracksuits with small prosthetic heads walking up and down stairs, four women dressed like synchronized swimmers (described by Gondry as "disco girls") moving up and down another set of stairs, four skeletons dancing in the center of the platform, and four mummies dancing in time with the song's drum pattern.

This is meant to be a visual representation of the song; each group of characters represents a different instrument. According to Gondry's notes, the robots represent the vocals, the physicality and small-minded rapidity of the athletes symbolizes the ascending/descending bass guitar, the femininity of the disco girls represents the high-pitched keyboard, the skeletons dance to the guitar, and the mummies represent the drum machine.

"Around the World" was Gondry's first attempt at bringing organized dancing to his music videos. "I was sick to see choreography being mistreated in videos like filler with fast cutting and fast editing, really shallow. I don't think choreography should be shot in close-ups." The sequence initially developed by Gondry was further expanded and streamlined by choreographer Blanca Li. The costumes for the video were designed by Florence Fontaine, the mother of Gondry's son. The flashing lights were operated by Gondry's brother, Olivier "Twist" Gondry. As he stated, "It all came down to a family affair."

Elements of the music video appear in the video for the LCD Soundsystem song "Daft Punk Is Playing at My House". The overall design has also been replicated for the Freemasons' "Rain Down Love" video. As part of the Daft Punk Experience game mode in the video game Fortnite, the music video is represented in an interactive arena with Lego objects and figures.

== Track listings ==
12-inch single (V25D-38608)
No.	Title	Music	Length
1.	"Around the World" (radio edit)		4:01
2.	"Around the World" (Tee's Frozen Sun mix)		7:56
3.	"Around the World" (Motorbass Vice mix)	Philippe Zdar (later of Cassius) and Étienne de Crécy	6:39
4.	"Around the World"		7:07
Total length:			25:43

Maxi-CD single (8941172)
No.	Title	Music	Length
1.	"Around the World" (radio edit)		4:01
2.	"Around the World"		7:07
3.	"Teachers" (extended mix)		5:51
4.	"Around the World" (Motorbass Vice mix)	Philippe Zdar (later of Cassius) and Étienne de Crécy	6:39
Total length:			23:38

== Charts ==
=== Original version ===
==== Weekly charts ====
Chart (1997)	Peak position
Australia (ARIA)	11
Austria (Ö3 Austria Top 40)	15
Belgium (Ultratop 50 Flanders)	15
Belgium (Ultratop 50 Wallonia)	4
Canada Top Singles (RPM)	24
Canada Dance/Urban (RPM)	1
Europe (Eurochart Hot 100)	5
Finland (Suomen virallinen lista)	9
France (SNEP)	5
Germany (GfK)	16
Iceland (Íslenski Listinn Topp 40)	1
Ireland (IRMA)	8
Israel (Israeli Singles Chart)	22
Italy (FIMI)	1
Netherlands (Dutch Top 40)	21
Netherlands (Single Top 100)	28
Norway (VG-lista)	20
Scottish Singles Sales (Official Charts)	7
Sweden (Sverigetopplistan)	20
Switzerland (Schweizer Hitparade)	14
UK Singles (Official Charts)	5
UK Dance (Official Charts)	1
US Billboard Hot 100	61
US Dance Club Songs (Billboard)	1
US Dance Singles Sales (Billboard)	12

Chart (2021)	Peak position
US Hot Dance/Electronic Songs (Billboard)	12

=== Alive 2007 version ===
Chart (2007)	Peak position
Switzerland (Schweizer Hitparade)	47

==== Year-end charts ====
Chart (1997)	Position
Australia (ARIA)	70
Belgium (Ultratop 50 Flanders)	85
Belgium (Ultratop 50 Wallonia)	55
Canada Dance/Urban (RPM)	23
Europe (Eurochart Hot 100)	48
France (SNEP)	40
Germany (Media Control)	88
Iceland (Íslenski Listinn Topp 40)	15
UK Singles (OCC)	151
US Dance Club Play (Billboard)	19

== Certifications ==
Region	Certification	Certified units/sales
Australia (ARIA)	Gold	35,000^{^}
Denmark (IFPI Danmark)	Gold	45,000^{‡}
France (SNEP)	Silver	125,000^{*}
Italy (FIMI)	Gold	25,000^{‡}
New Zealand (RMNZ)	2× Platinum	60,000^{‡}
United Kingdom (BPI)	Platinum	478,000
^{*} Sales figures based on certification alone.^{^} Shipments figures based on certification alone.^{‡} Sales+streaming figures based on certification alone.

== Release history ==
Region	Date	Format(s)	Label(s)	Ref.
Netherlands	7 April 1997	CD	Virgin	
United Kingdom	14 April 1997	12-inch vinyl; CD; cassette	Virgin	
United States	12 August 1997	Rhythmic contemporary radio	Virgin	
United States	18 August 1997	Alternative radio	Virgin	
United States	14 October 1997	Contemporary hit radio	Virgin	
