= Tron: Catalyst =

2025 video game

- Developer: Bithell Games
- Publishers: Devolver Digital; Big Fan Games
- Director: Mike Bithell
- Producers: Emma Park; Rachael Rose
- Designers: Victoria Torres; Wesley Arthur; Bryn Findlay-Dykes; Nat Clayton; Julia Brown
- Programmers: Alex Darby; Hannah Rose; Sam Febvre; Ev Amitay
- Artist: Nick Atherton
- Writer: Mike Bithell
- Composer: Dan le Sac
- Series: Tron
- Engine: Unity
- Platforms: PC; PlayStation 5; Xbox Series X/S; Nintendo Switch
- Release: WW: June 17, 2025
- Genres: Action-adventure, visual novel, puzzle
- Mode: Single-player

Tron: Catalyst is a 2025 action-adventure game developed and published by Bithell Games based on the Tron franchise. The game serves as the sequel to Tron: Identity (2023). Players control Exo, a program who gains time-looping abilities after trying to deliver a mysterious package when it suddenly explodes. She then embarks on a quest to find out the cause of the explosion and her abilities.

Like Tron: Identity, Tron: Catalyst received mixed reception, with many critics praising the story, soundtrack and atmosphere, but criticized the game's repetitive combat and clunky, shallow mechanics.

== Gameplay ==
Tron: Catalyst is a top-down action-adventure game. The game takes place in the Arq Grid, a digital sanctuary created by Kevin Flynn. Players control Exo, a courier program working in the grid's capital city, who is suddenly upended by a near-death experience when a mysterious package she is delivering explodes, leaving her with a unique ability known as "the Glitch", which allows her to trigger system-level time loops. This leads to a formation of many factions, as she is then pursued by Conn, an agent of the authoritarian faction Core, who learns of Exo's abilities, and views them as the key element that will allow him to move up in Core.

Players team up with allies like Query, a former detective, as they hunt for answers on why Exo has this ability and to find out the true culprit who's responsible for the explosion. When exploring the grid, players navigate on foot or via Light Cycles, which are used for both travel and specific combat sequences. In other combat sequences, players use Exo's Identity Disc, which has mechanics such as parrying, dodging, and "Disc kicks". Players can also steal enemies' code to copy their fighting styles. In terms of progression, players collect Data Shards to upgrade Exo’s code base and unlock new abilities.

== Development and release ==
Bithell Games founder Mike Bithell said that Tron: Catalyst, rather than it being an open-world game, is composed of multiple "big levels". He states, "It's meant to be a game about playing with those relationships and exploring how characters can kind of be influenced and have their minds changed."

The official trailer was released on October 14, 2024, and the release date trailer was released on February 24, 2025. Bithell Games released Tron: Catalyst on PC, PlayStation 5, Xbox Series X/S, and Nintendo Switch on June 17, 2025.

== Reception ==
Reception

Aggregate scores
Aggregator	Score
Metacritic	(PC) 69/100 (NS) 65/100 (PS5) 65/100 (XSXS) 67/100
OpenCritic	35% recommend

Review scores
Publication	Score
Eurogamer	4/5 stars
IGN	7/10
Push Square	7/10
XboxEra	8/10

Tron: Catalyst received "mixed or average" reviews from critics, according to the review aggregation website Metacritic. Fellow review aggregator OpenCritic assessed that the game received fair approval, being recommended by 35% of critics. IGN said it is "a nice, restrained palate cleanser" but they "wanted it to be a bit more" and that "it could’ve been something special." Eurogamer says the game is "a sleek and polished labour of love that revels in its license and building on it in interesting ways." They also stated that although it is a budget release, "there's nothing thrifty about its vision for the continuing adventures of these aggy, angry little computer people."

Push Square speaking about the combat sequences, said that despite the fact that they "don't mix up their approaches in any meaningful way," the sequences "stays fun all the way through the 10 hours it'll take to wrap up the story." XboxEra says that while it doesn't "reinvent the wheel, nor hit the heights of the legendary Tron 2.0", it "perfectly captures the essence of the TRON audiovisual experience, without overstaying its welcome", and also reignites the hype for the third film in the franchise Tron: Ares, which came out later that year.
