= Tron (franchise) =

Disney media franchise

- Official franchise logo
- Created by: Steven Lisberger; Bonnie MacBird
- Original work: Tron (1982)
- Owner: The Walt Disney Company
- Years: 1982–present

Films and television
- Film: Tron (1982) Tron: Legacy (2010) Tron: Ares (2025)
- Short film: Tron: The Next Day (2011)
- Animated series: Tron: Uprising (2012–2013)

Games
- Video games: List of video games

Audio
- Soundtracks: Tron (1982); Tron: Legacy (2010); Tron: Legacy Reconfigured (2011); Tron: Uprising (2013); Tron: Ares (2025)

Miscellaneous
- Theme park attractions: ElecTRONica; Tron Lightcycle Power Run

Tron is an American science fiction media franchise created by Steven Lisberger and Bonnie MacBird, first introduced with the 1982 film Tron. The series primarily takes place within "the Grid", a series of digital virtual realities where computer programs exist as sentient entities. Many of these programs resemble their human creators, known as Users, and are often forced to compete in lethal gladiatorial contests. The title refers to the central character Tron, a self-governing security program designed to defend the Grid's system in the original film.

Produced and distributed by Walt Disney Pictures, the franchise currently comprises three feature films: Tron (1982), Tron: Legacy (2010), and Tron: Ares (2025). The series has expanded into multiple forms of media, including novels, comic books, video games, soundtrack albums, and theme park attractions. It also inspired the animated television series Tron: Uprising, which aired on Disney XD from 2012 to 2013.

The Tron films are frequently cited for their innovative achievements in visual effects, sound design, and electronic music. Despite mixed reviews from critics, the Tron franchise attained cult status, with the original film receiving particular recognition for its distinctive visual style and pioneering use of early computer-generated imagery. The films have collectively grossed $600 million at the worldwide box office.

== Premise ==
Each Tron film introduces a distinct digital virtual reality, all of which are collectively known as "the Grid". In all of these systems, programs exist as sentient entities, many of which resemble their human creators, known as Users, and are frequently compelled to participate in deadly gladiatorial contests. Each program carries an identity disc, which functions as a record of its experiences within the Grid and can also be used as a weapon. The Grid features a variety of distinct elements, including vehicles, weapons, and ships, such as light cycles and recognizers. Programs may be destroyed through "deresolution", which means the program is deleted by dissolving into pixels.

=== ENCOM Mainframe ===
Depicted in the original Tron and Tron: Ares, the ENCOM Mainframe was created as the operating system of ENCOM International. The Game Grid is where programs were sent to fight in gladiatorial games.

=== Grid ===
Depicted in Tron: Legacy and Tron: Uprising, the Grid was created by Kevin Flynn after his experience within the original 1982 ENCOM Mainframe. Flynn created the second system on a private server located beneath his arcade. Intended to be a virtual utopia with an intricate city design, the Grid is vastly more complex in existence and function. The Grid spontaneously gave rise to a unique class of self-generating programs called Isomorphic Algorithms, or ISOs. The Grid features a dark atmosphere and translucent shades of blue, green, teal, and white.

=== Dillinger Grid ===
Depicted in Tron: Ares, the Dillinger Grid was created by Dillinger Systems and is bathed in shades of red, black, and gray.

== Films ==
Film	U.S. release date	Director(s)	Screenwriter(s)	Story by	Producer(s)
Tron	July 9, 1982	Steven Lisberger	Steven Lisberger	Bonnie MacBird & Steven Lisberger	Donald Kushner
Tron: Legacy	December 17, 2010	Joseph Kosinski	Adam Horowitz & Edward Kitsis	Adam Horowitz, Edward Kitsis, Lee Sternthal & Brian Klugman	Sean Bailey, Jeffrey Silver & Steven Lisberger
Tron: Ares	October 10, 2025	Joachim Rønning	Jesse Wigutow	David Digilio & Jesse Wigutow	Sean Bailey, Jeffrey Silver, Justin Springer, Jared Leto, Emma Ludbrook & Steven Lisberger

Tron story chronology
- Tron (1982)
- Tron: Betrayal (2010)
- Tron: Evolution (2010)
- Tron: Uprising (2012-2013)
- Tron: Legacy (2010)
- Tron: Identity (2023)
- Tron: Catalyst (2025)
- Tron: Ares (2025)

=== Tron (1982) ===
Kevin Flynn, a genius software programmer and video game developer, seeks to expose Ed Dillinger, an executive at his former employer ENCOM, for stealing his game designs. While attempting to retrieve evidence of the theft from the company's computer system, Flynn is digitized and transported into the Grid, a virtual environment governed by the authoritarian Master Control Program (MCP). Within this digital realm, he joins forces with Tron—a security program created by Flynn's colleague Alan Bradley—to challenge the MCP's domination and restore freedom to the system. After destroying the MCP, Flynn returns to the real world with proof of Dillinger's plagiarism and is reinstated as ENCOM's new CEO.

Tron was written and directed by Steven Lisberger, with a story by Lisberger and Bonnie MacBird, and features music composed by Wendy Carlos. The film stars Jeff Bridges as Kevin Flynn, Bruce Boxleitner as Alan Bradley and Tron, Cindy Morgan, Dan Shor, and David Warner as all three main antagonists: the program Sark, his User Ed Dillinger, and the voice of the Master Control Program (MCP).

=== Tron: Legacy (2010) ===
Set 27 years after the events of the first film, the story follows Sam Flynn, the adult son of Kevin Flynn, who has become the largest shareholder of ENCOM following his father's mysterious disappearance in 1989. While investigating his father's abandoned arcade and office, Sam discovers a concealed computer terminal and is unexpectedly transported into the Grid. Within the Grid, Sam reunites with his long-lost father, who has been trapped there for over two decades after being betrayed by his digital counterpart, Clu. Together with warrior Quorra, an Isomorphic Algorithm and the last of her kind, they embark on a mission to prevent Clu from invading the real world. The film concludes with Kevin sacrificing himself to reintegrate with Clu, destroying them both and allowing Sam and Quorra to escape back to reality.

Tron: Legacy was directed by Joseph Kosinski in his feature film directorial debut, produced by Lisberger, written by Adam Horowitz and Edward Kitsis, and features original music by Daft Punk. Jeff Bridges and Bruce Boxleitner reprise their roles as Kevin Flynn and Alan Bradley, respectively, while also appearing in digitally de-aged forms as their program counterparts, Clu and Tron. The film also stars Garrett Hedlund as Sam Flynn, Olivia Wilde as Quorra, James Frain, Beau Garrett, and Michael Sheen.

=== Tron: Ares (2025) ===
Set fifteen years after the events of the second film, ENCOM and rival corporation Dillinger Systems—led by Julian Dillinger, grandson of Ed Dillinger—compete to bring digital constructs into the physical world. A sophisticated program named Ares is sent by Julian Dillinger from the digital realm into reality on a dangerous mission, marking humanity's first contact with artificial intelligences from the Grid. Ares, however, betrays Dillinger's command and aligns with Eve Kim, the new CEO of ENCOM who took over after Sam Flynn left the company for personal reasons, and together attempt to locate Kevin Flynn's Permanence Code, a key line of coding enabling digital beings to exist in the real world permanently.

Tron: Ares was directed by Joachim Rønning, written by Jesse Wigutow, and features original music by Nine Inch Nails. The film stars Jared Leto as Ares, Greta Lee as Eve Kim, Evan Peters as Julian Dillinger, Jodie Turner-Smith, Hasan Minhaj, Arturo Castro, Gillian Anderson, and Jeff Bridges reprising his role as Kevin Flynn.

== Short film ==
Film	U.S. release date	Director(s)	Screenwriter(s)	Producer(s)
Tron: The Next Day	April 5, 2011	Kurt Mattila	Kurt Mattila & Robert Auten	Brian Hall & Christina Hwang

=== Tron: The Next Day (2011) ===
The short film titled Tron: The Next Day, chronologically taking place one day after the events of Tron: Legacy, was included in all home media releases of Legacy; distributed by Walt Disney Studios Home Entertainment on April 5, 2011. The film, in addition to dealing with the immediate aftermath of Legacy, explores events that occurred between the events of the original film and its sequel.

Boxleitner and Hedlund reprise their roles as Alan Bradley and Sam Flynn, as well as Dan Shor returning as Roy Kleinberg from the first film.

== Television ==
Series	Season	Episodes	First released	Last released	Showrunner(s)	Network(s)
Tron: Uprising	1	19	May 18, 2012	January 28, 2013	Disney Television Animation	Disney XD

=== Tron: Uprising (2012–2013) ===
In March 2010, Disney announced that an animated television series, entitled Tron: Uprising, was in production. Set between the first and second films. Uprising explores Tron's attempts at mentoring new programs and forming a revolution against Clu. The premiere aired on June 7, 2012, on Disney XD. The series was cancelled after 19 episodes with the last episode airing on January 28, 2013.

== Cancelled TV projects ==
In 2005, animation director Ciro Nieli was given the opportunity to develop an animated TV series based on Tron. Nieli, who is best known for 2012's Teenage Mutant Ninja Turtles, had previously created the series Super Robot Monkey Team Hyperforce Go! for Disney. However, plans for the Tron series ultimately fell through. According to Nieli, the pitch for the Tron series was reworked from a previous original concept of his known as "Powercade", featuring two kids who inherit electrical powers, accompanied by a creature named "Glitch".

A live action television series was in development by John Ridley as a Disney+ exclusive, before the project was shelved in 2020.

== Cast and characters ==
List indicators

This section includes characters who will appear or have appeared in more than two films in the series.

- An empty grey cell indicates the character was not in the film, or that the character's official presence has not yet been confirmed.
- ^{C} indicates a cameo role.
- ^{P} indicates an appearance in onscreen photographs.
- ^{U} indicates an uncredited appearance.
- ^{V} indicates a voice-only role.
- ^{Y} indicates a younger version of the character.

Characters	Films			Short film	Television series
Characters	Tron	Tron: Legacy	Tron: Ares	Tron: The Next Day	Tron: Uprising
Characters	1982	2010	2025	2011	2012–2013
Kevin Flynn Clu	Jeff Bridges	Jeff Bridges	Jeff Bridges	Jeff Bridges	Fred Tatasciore^{V}
Alan Bradley / Tron / Rinzler	Bruce Boxleitner	Bruce Boxleitner		Bruce Boxleitner	Bruce Boxleitner^{V}
Roy Kleinberg / Ram	Dan Shor			Dan Shor	
Edward "Ed" Dillinger Sr. / Sark	David Warner		David Warner^{P}^{V}^{U}	David Warner^{V}^{U}	
Crom	Peter Jurasik				
Dr. Lora Baines / Yori	Cindy Morgan				
Dr. Walter Gibbs / Dumont	Barnard Hughes				
Samuel "Sam" Flynn		Garrett Hedlund Owen Best^{Y}	Garrett Hedlund^{P}^{U}	Garrett Hedlund	
Quorra		Olivia Wilde	Olivia Wilde^{P}^{U}		Olivia Wilde^{V}
Edward "Ed" Dillinger Jr.		Cillian Murphy^{C}^{U}			
Castor / Zuse		Michael Sheen			
Disc Jockeys		Daft Punk			
Gem		Beau Garrett			
Jarvis		James Frain			
Richard Mackey		Jeffrey Nordling			
Ares			Jared Leto		
Eve Kim			Greta Lee Miru Kim^{Y}		
Julian Dillinger			Evan Peters		
Ajay Singh			Hasan Minhaj		
Athena			Jodie Turner-Smith		
Seth Flores			Arturo Castro		
Caius			Cameron Monaghan		
Elisabeth Dillinger			Gillian Anderson		
Erin			Sarah Desjardins		
Matthew Roth				Alex Sanborn	
Beck					Elijah Wood^{V}
Mara					Mandy Moore^{V}
Zed					Nate Corddry^{V}
General Tesler					Lance Henriksen^{V}
Paige					Emmanuelle Chriqui^{V}
Able					Reginald VelJohnson^{V}
Pavel					Paul Reubens^{V}
Voice of The Grid					Tricia Helfer^{V}

== Reception ==
=== Box office performance ===
Film	Box office gross			Budget	Ref.
Film	North America	Other territories	Worldwide	Budget	Ref.
Tron	$33,000,000	$17,000,000	$50,000,000	$17 million	
Tron: Legacy	$172,062,763	$237,843,485	$409,912,892	$170 million	
Tron: Ares	$72,780,466	$68,806,928	$141,587,394	$180–220 million	
Total	$277,843,229	$323,650,413	$601,500,286	$367–407 million	

=== Critical and public response ===
Film	Rotten Tomatoes	Metacritic	CinemaScore
Tron	60% (161 reviews)	58 (13 reviews)	B+
Tron: Legacy	51% (252 reviews)	49 (40 reviews)	B+
Tron: Ares	52% (271 reviews)	48 (49 reviews)	B+

=== Accolades ===
Academy Awards

Award category
Award category	Tron	Tron: Legacy
Best Costume Design	Nominated	
Best Sound Mixing	Nominated	
Best Sound Editing		Nominated
Technical Achievement	Won	

== Music ==
=== Soundtracks ===
Title	U.S. release date	Length	Composer(s)	Label
Tron: Original Motion Picture Soundtrack	July 9, 1982	49:41	Wendy Carlos, Journey	CBS, Walt Disney
Tron: Legacy (Original Motion Picture Soundtrack)	December 3, 2010	58:44	Daft Punk	Walt Disney
Tron: Legacy Reconfigured (Remixes of Selections from the Original Motion Picture Soundtrack)	April 5, 2011	77:43	Daft Punk	Walt Disney
Tron: Uprising (Music from and Inspired By the Series)	January 8, 2013	1:15:42	Joseph Trapanese	Walt Disney
Tron: Ares (Original Motion Picture Soundtrack)	September 19, 2025	66:49	Nine Inch Nails	Interscope, Walt Disney
Tron Ares: Divergence	February 27, 2026	77:03	Nine Inch Nails	Interscope, Walt Disney

=== Singles ===
Title	U.S. release date	Length	Artist	Label
"Derezzed"	December 8, 2010	1:44	Daft Punk	Walt Disney
"As Alive as You Need Me to Be"	July 17, 2025	3:53	Nine Inch Nails	Interscope

== Other media ==
=== Theme park attractions ===
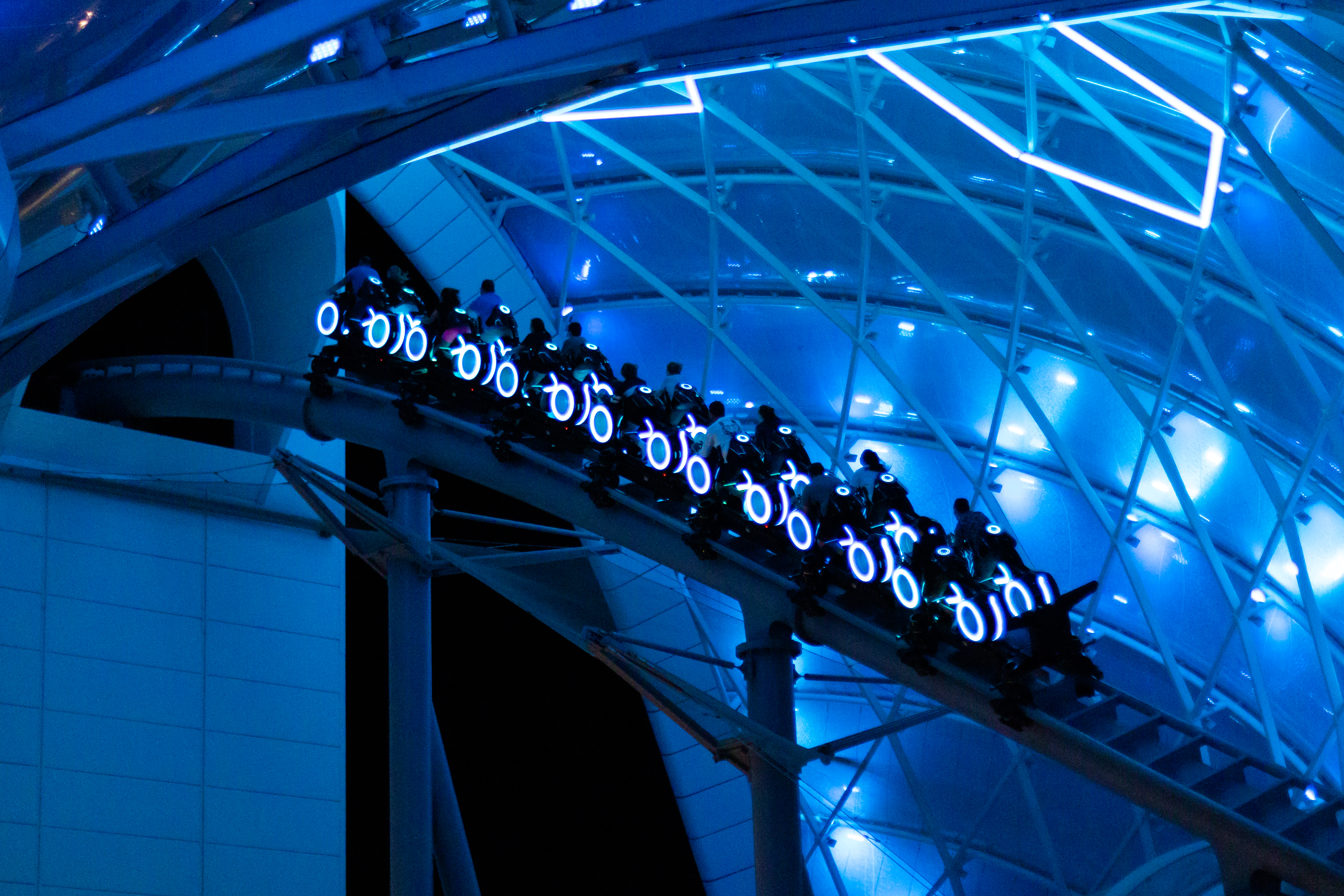
Riders experiencing Tron Lightcycle Run at Magic Kingdom.

From 1982 to 1995, Tron was featured in Disneyland's PeopleMover attraction, as part of The World of Tron, in which the light cycle sequence from the film was projected around park guests as their vehicle passed through a tunnel on the upper level of the Carousel Theater, placing the PeopleMover in the role of a light cycle. The attraction was known as PeopleMover Thru the World of Tron after this sequence was added. From 1977 to 1982, this segment was previously home to the "SuperSpeed Tunnel," in which race cars were projected around the vehicles.

In 2010, the Epcot Monorail on the Walt Disney World Monorail System received wrap advertisements featuring blue and yellow light cycles on either side of the train to promote Tron: Legacy.

ElecTRONica was announced on the Disney Parks Blog for Disney California Adventure in Anaheim, California. Disney's ElecTRONica is an interactive nighttime dance party in the Hollywood Pictures Backlot. It is a similar experience to Glow Fest, but with a focus on Tron: Legacy. ElecTRONica features lights, lasers, music, and projections to promote the film. On October 29, 2010, the nighttime show World of Color began soft-openings, which included a Tron: Legacy-themed encore using Daft Punk's original music from the soundtrack and new effects and projections on various Paradise Pier attractions. The segment was added on November 1, 2010, and ended on March 23, 2011. ElecTRONica ended on April 15, 2012, and was replaced by Mad T Party.

In 2016, a roller coaster called Tron Lightcycle Power Run opened in Shanghai Disneyland. Guests board single-seat motorbike roller coasters modeled after light cycles and manufactured by Vekoma. A cloned version of the ride opened at Magic Kingdom in Walt Disney World on April 3, 2023.

=== Novels ===
A novelization of Tron was released in 1982, written by American science fiction novelist Brian Daley. It included eight pages of color photographs from the movie. Also that year, Disney Senior Staff Publicist Michael Bonifer authored a book entitled The Art of Tron which covered aspects of the pre-production and post-production aspects of Tron. To support the film's release in 1982, Disney also published several books targeting children, including Tron: A Pop-Up Book, Tron: The Storybook, and The Story of Tron, a book and audio combination (with either 33 RPM 7 inch record or audio cassette).

A nonfiction book about the making of the original film, called The Making of Tron: How Tron Changed Visual Effects and Disney Forever was published in 2011 and written by William Kallay.

In 2010, to coincide with the release of Tron: Legacy, a range of new books have been released; including a range of junior novels – Tron: The Junior Novel by Alice Alfonsi, Tron: Legacy – Derezzed by James Gelsey, Tron: Legacy – Out of the Dark by Tennant Redbank, Tron: Legacy – It's Your Call: Initiate Sequence by Carla Jablonski. Additional books include The Art of Tron: Legacy by Justin Springer, Joseph Kosinski, and Darren Gilford, and Tron Legacy: The Movie Storybook by James Ponti.

=== Comics ===
To support the release of the film in 1982, Disney briefly ran a Sunday comic strip adaptation of the film. It was part of the umbrella series Walt Disney's Treasury of Classic Tales and it was written by Jeannette Steiner with art by Richard Moore.

In 2003, 88 MPH solicited a miniseries titled Tron 2.0: Derezzed. This comic was canceled before any issues were released.

In 2005, Slave Labor Graphics announced its six-issue miniseries, Tron: The Ghost in the Machine. The first issue was released in April 2006, the second issue in November of the same year. The comic book explores the concept of making a backup copy of a User within the computer system, and how that artificial intelligence might be materialized into the real world. The comic book was written by Landry Walker and Eric Jones, with art in the first two issues by Louie De Martinis. The artist on the last three issues was Mike Shoykhet.

The comic from Slave Labor Graphics opens with a detailed history of the Tron universe, providing this previously unseen background on the events that allowed Ed Dillinger and the MCP to rise to power:

In the early 1970s, a small engineering company called ENCOM introduced a revolutionary type of software designed to direct and streamline the transfer of data between networked machines. Ed Dillinger, the lead programmer on this project, realized the enormous potential of his team's creation and secretly encoded a secondary function to be activated upon installation: to copy the sub-routines of other programs and absorb their functions. This alteration allowed Dillinger to appropriate research and claim it as his own, and he rose quickly through ENCOM’s corporate ranks. This was the beginning of the Master Control Program.

Marvel Comics released a two issue miniseries entitled Tron: Betrayal in October 2010. The story takes place a year after the original film. In January 2011, to coincide with the release of the sequel Tron: Legacy, Marvel also released a new comic book adaptation of the original 1982 film. Tron: Original Movie Adaptation was written by Peter David with art by Mirco Pierfederici.

A manga version of Tron: Legacy was released by Earth Star Entertainment in Japan on June 30, 2011.

=== Video games ===
As video games are a key element in the films, various games based on Tron have been produced over the years. Atari initially had plans to develop a Space Paranoids adaptation, but this was canceled due to the video game crash of 1983. A complete list of the released video games, follows.

- TomyTronic Tron (1981): Takara Tomy released a tabletop VFD video game comprising three mini-games based on sequences in the movie, including: light cycles, disc combat (with elements of the movie's "Ring Game"/"Hyperball"), and attacking the MCP. The game predates the release of the movie by about a year. Grandstand distributed this game in the UK.
- Tron (1982): Developed by Midway Games as an arcade game, gameplay consisted of four mini-games based on sequences in the film. This game earned more than the film's initial box office release.
- Tron: Deadly Discs / Tron: Maze-A-Tron / Tron: Solar Sailer (1982): Three distinct games, developed by Mattel Electronics for the Mattel Intellivision game console. Deadly Discs was later ported to the Atari 2600. Tron: Maze-a-Tron was later released on the Mattel Intellivision and the Atari 2600, with a new title of Adventures of Tron. A version was also released for the short-lived Mattel Aquarius home computer. An official joystick resembling the Tron arcade game joystick was also created as a free giveaway in a special pack that included both Atari 2600 Tron video games.
- TomyTutor Tron (1983): Developed by Tomy, for the Tomy Tutor home computer. However, the release only had the Tron moniker in Japan. The game was released stateside with the title, Hyperspace.
- Discs of Tron (1983): Developed by Midway Games as a sequel to their initial release, the gameplay focuses on the disc-combat from the film.
- Tron 2.0 (2003): A PC game sequel released for Windows and Macintosh. In this first-person shooter game, the player takes the part of Alan Bradley's son Jet, who is pulled into the computer world to fight a computer virus. A version of this game was later ported to the Xbox and re-titled, Tron 2.0 Killer App. It features additional multiplayer modes. An almost completely different game of the same name is also available for the Game Boy Advance, where Tron and a Light Cycle program named Mercury (first seen in Tron 2.0 for the PC) fight their way through the ENCOM computer to stop a virus called The Corruptor. This game includes light cycle, battle tank, and recognizer battle modes, several security-related minigames, and the arcade games Tron and Discs of Tron. While the Game Boy Advance game is only minimally connected to the PC game, one of the 100 unlockable chips shows a picture of Jet Bradley.
- Virtual Magic Kingdom (2005): Developed by Walt Disney Parks and Resorts and Sulake Corporation Ltd., and distributed The Walt Disney Company as an online massive multiplayer game, for Microsoft Windows and Apple MacOs X PCs. The game includes a room based on Tron and featuring Recognizers and the Master Control Program (MCP). Multiple furniture items were inspired by elements of the films, with Light Cycle Chairs, Tank Chairs, a Tron Arcade Game Cabinet, Sark's Red suit, and Tron's Blue suit. VMK is closed as of May 21, 2008. Popular among fans, players attempted protesting the eventual shutdown of the game. Virtual Magic Kingdom was officially closed and discontinued on April 7, 2008.
- Kingdom Hearts II (2005): Developed by Square Enix Product Development Division 1 and distributed by Square Enix, the game features an action role-playing genre for the Sony PlayStation 2. Tron appears in the "Space Paranoids" level of the game, featuring elements from the fictional video game from the movie, alongside other Tron characters including Commander Sark and the Master Control Program (MCP). The game was later remastered and expanded with later editions released on Sony: PlayStation 3, and PlayStation 4; and Microsoft: Xbox One game consoles. The game, alongside the various other Kingdom Hearts games, received critical acclaim.
- Space Paranoids (2009): Developed by 42 Entertainment, a limited number of eight real-life arcade machines based on the games from the original movie, during the 2009 San Diego Comic-Con. The machines were placed in a recreated Flynn's Arcade near the center of the convention. The gameplay includes a goal of defeating levels, while achieving as many points as possible by destroying Recognizers. The maximum number of points a person can achieve is 999 000 pts. This is reference to the score Flynn reached in the film, and is a record currently held by the gamer with the initials FLN. The controls consist of a pilot-like joystick and a ball, which moves the turret and tank.
- Tron: Evolution (2010): Developed by Propaganda Games and released as a tie-in video game and based on Tron: Legacy, available on Microsoft Windows for a PC, PlayStation 3, PlayStation Portable, and Xbox 360 game consoles. The gameplay is an action adventure genre game, that features a third person camera perspective, and heavily references the film. The game developers touted that a player of the game would understand the movie on a deeper degree.
- Tron Evolution: Battle Grids (2010): Developed by n-Space Inc. and distributed by Disney Interactive Studios, as a Nintendo exclusive for their Wii and DS game consoles. The plot, which takes place before Legacy, includes a device where the user creates their own 'program' character, who meets and interacts with Quorra and Tron.
- Epic Mickey (2010): Developed by Junction Point Studios and distributed by Disney Interactive Studios, the title features a platform gameplay style. Inspired by and based on The Walt Disney Company history, the game features various Tron elements in its Tomorrow City level. Spatter enemies wear the red suits of Sark's minions, while one of the robotic Beetleworx of the area has a light cycle-inspired torso. The boss of the level is Petetronic, a version of Pete in the style of Sark. To beat Petetronic, the player must deflect his disc attacks and change his circuitry colors to blue, which shuts down his villainous coding. The character becomes a Master Control Program, in the alternate ending of the game. The game earned average to good critical reviews.
- Disney Universe (2011): Developed by Eurocom and distributed by Disney Interactive Studios for the Sony PlayStation 3, Nintendo Wii, Microsoft Xbox 360 game consoles, as well as Microsoft Windows for PCs. The title genre, is a co-operative action-adventure platform gameplay. Abstract versions of Tron: Legacy characters appear during the plot. Disney Universe was met with mixed critical reception. The game was later remastered for the PlayStation 3, and is available via the PlayStation Store.
- Kingdom Hearts 3D: Dream Drop Distance (2012): Developed by Square Enix 1st Production Department and distributed by Square Enix, the title is an action role-playing video game released on the Nintendo 3DS game console. Elements from the films included in the plot, include a level named The Grid, inspired by and featuring elements from Tron: Legacy; and features the characters Kevin Flynn, Sam Flynn, Quorra, CLU, Rinzler, and the Black Guards. The game was met with positive critical reception. The game was ported and included in the Kingdom Hearts HD 2.8 Final Chapter Prologue re-release, as well as the Kingdom Hearts: The Story So Far and the Kingdom Hearts: All-in-One-Package collection bundles for the Sony PlayStation 4 and Microsoft Xbox One game consoles.
- Disney Infinity (2013–2016): Developed by Avalanche Software and distributed by Disney Interactive Studios for the Microsoft: Xbox 360 and Xbox One; Nintendo: 3DS, Wii, and Wii U; Sony: PlayStation 3, PlayStation 4, and PlayStation Vita; as well as Microsoft Windows for PCs, Apple iOS for iPhones, Android, and Apple TV for Apple products. The title features an action-adventure toys-to-life-sandbox genre, with elements and characters unlocked through purchasing the various physical figurines and action figures to interact with the game. The plot includes several Tron-based items: the Identity Disc (weapon pack), Light Runner (ground vehicle), Recognizer (aerial vehicle), and three Power Discs (including: User Control for increased experience, the Grid skydome, and TRON terrain). In the Disney Infinity 3.0 expansion, Sam Flynn and Quorra were added as purchasable/playable characters, with the Light Cycle. The game was met with positive critical reception. Despite the game's popularity, Avalanche Software was closed and the franchise ultimately retired on May 11, 2016.
- Tron: RUN/r (2016): Developed by Sanzaru Games and distributed by Disney Interactive Studios, available on the Sony PlayStation 4 and Microsoft Xbox One game consoles, as well as on Microsoft Windows for a PC. The gameplay genre is an action-arcade endless runner game, and was met with mixed critical reception.
- Fortnite Battle Royale (2017): Developed and published by Epic Games for PC, PlayStation 4, PlayStation 5, Xbox One, Xbox Series X/S, Nintendo Switch, Nintendo Switch 2, and Android. The game is part of the Battle Royale genre. In Chapter 2 – Season 5, multiple Tron themed cosmetic items were introduced to the game's Item Shop. These included 10 different characters wearing the outfit worn by Grid Warriors in Tron: Legacy, an Identity Disc Back Bling and Pickaxe, and a Light Cycle glider. The cosmetic items were introduced on February 11, 2021, and could be purchased with V-Bucks, the in-game currency. The characters were brought into the Fortnite universe by Agent John Jones via the Zero Point, and were recruited to prevent anyone from escaping "The Loop".
- Tron: Identity (2023): Developed by Bithell Games. Described as a visual novel adventure, the title follows Query, a detective program that must solve an unprecedented crime in The Grid. The game was released in April 2023 on PC and Switch.
- Tron: Catalyst (2025): Developed again by Bithell Games and published by Big Fan Games (Devolver Digital). An isometric action-adventure game that is a sequel to Tron: Identity.

=== Light cycles ===
The redesigned light cycle as featured in the Comic-Con VFX test footage

Light cycles were originally fictional vehicles designed by Syd Mead for the simulated world of the Tron universe. Five real-life replica light cycles were created by Parker Brothers Concepts in Florida, one of which was sold by Sotheby's for a reported $77,000. (Note: Sobey's reports it was sold for $77k but the news article reports it was sold for $55k.)

These futuristic two-wheeled vehicles resemble motorcycles and create walls of colored light. The vehicles were primarily used in a competition between humanoid computer programs, similar to the 1976 arcade game Blockade, which was the first of a genre called snake. Players are in constant motion on a playfield, creating a wall of light behind them as they move. If players hit a wall, their light cycle explodes, placing them out of the game; the last player in the game wins. Since the original display in Tron, there have been numerous adaptations, as well as references in popular culture.

A light cycle toy, in red and yellow versions, was produced by Tomy as part of the merchandising for the Tron film, along with action figures scaled to fit inside the toy cycles. Bootleg versions of Tomy's design were produced by other toy manufacturers that came in a wide variety of colors, including blue and silver, but were noticeably smaller than the Tomy-produced toy, too small in fact to accommodate one of the Tomy action figures.

Light cycles make a return in Tron: Legacy, with new designs by Daniel Simon. According to the press conference at Comic-Con 2009, a new vehicle appears called a "Light Runner," a two-seat version of the light cycle. It is said to be very fast, and has the unique ability to go off the grid on its own power. We also get a glimpse at Kevin Flynn's own cycle, a "Second Generation Light Cycle" designed in 1989 by Flynn and "rumor has it it's still the fastest thing on the grid." It incorporates some of the look of both films.

The video game Tron: Evolution, which is set between the events of Tron and Tron: Legacy, features light cycles in sections of the single-player mode and in certain game maps for the multiplayer mode. Light cycle use in multiplayer gives players the option to shift back and forth between cycle and foot travel at will, and provides multiple attack and defensive options beyond the classic "boxing in" of an opponent. In addition, the light cycles of Evolution can pass through their own light trails (and the trails of allied players) unharmed.

A more classic interpretation of the light cycle game is shown in the video game Tron: Evolution – Battle Grids, which is primarily based on offline multi- or single-player matches. These light cycle battles do not allow the player to pass through their own trail, but do allow passage through teammates' trails. There is also no option to travel on foot.

A Tron: Legacy themed Lego Ideas set with two Lightcycles was released in 2018.

=== Other ===
Several Tron easter eggs appear throughout Once Upon a Time, such as a bar named Flynn's Barcade in the seventh season.

== See also ==
- Golden age of arcade video games
