= Adventures of Tron =

1983 video game

- Developer: APh Technological Consulting
- Publisher: M Network
- Designer: Hal Finney
- Series: Tron
- Platform: Atari 2600
- Release: NA: March 1983
- Genre: Platform

Adventures of Tron is a platform video game produced by Mattel and published under its M Network label for the Atari 2600 in 1983. It is based on the Disney film Tron. The game was originally intended to be a port of the Intellivision video game Tron: Maze-A-Tron, but it became an original title as development progressed. An Intellivision version of Adventures of Tron was also planned, but it was ultimately cancelled and never saw an official release. Following the loss of the Tron license, the game was re-released as Adventures on GX-12.

== Gameplay ==
Tron must evade enemies and collect items across four floors.

In the game the player controls Tron, who has to avoid a variety of enemies while navigating a building with four floors. The upper floors are accessible via two elevators on the left and right of the screen. The player can jump down one floor by pressing down, and can jump up in the air by pressing the fire button. A gap with a pole in the center of the floor will drop the player down to the ground level, and must be jumped across in order to get to the other side.

Enemies patrol each floor (all of which are based on aspects of the film), including the Recognizers and Grid Bugs which travel in groups of three, and the Tanks, which are much larger and fire fast moving projectiles. A unique enemy are the Solar Sailers, which fly in the air, and do not kill the player on contract, but rather push them backwards, impeding progress and potentially putting the player into harm's way. The player cannot fight back, and thus must evade these enemies by jumping over them or dropping down to a lower floor. The player must collect floating Bits which fly near the ceiling of each floor (the higher the floor the Bit is collected on, the higher the point total).

== Reception ==
The game received fairly positive reviews from critics, with praise for its graphics and sound, as well as its controls and platforming design, but the gameplay received some criticism, which was viewed as a bit repetitive and at times even frustrating.
