= Tron 2.0 =

2003 video game

- Developer: Monolith Productions (Note: Ported to Xbox by Climax LA. Lavastorm Analytics developed the mobile version, while Digital Eclipse developed the Game Boy Advance version.)
- Publisher: Buena Vista Interactive (Note: Walt Disney Internet Group published the Mobile version. MacPlay published the Mac OS X version.)
- Producers: Cliff Kamida; Garrett Price
- Designer: Frank Rooke
- Programmers: Kevin Stephens; Kevin Lambert
- Artists: Eric Kohler; Matt Allen
- Composer: Nathan Grigg
- Series: Tron
- Engine: LithTech Triton
- Platforms: Windows; Mac OS X Mobile phone Game Boy Advance; Xbox
- Release: Windows: NA: August 26, 2003; AU: August 28, 2003; EU: September 19, 2003; OS X: EU: November 14, 2003; NA: June 1, 2004; Mobile: NA: November 26, 2003 (Light Cycles); NA: May 12, 2004 (Discs of Tron); Game Boy Advance: NA: October 20, 2004; EU: November 12, 2004; Xbox: NA: November 3, 2004; EU: November 19, 2004
- Genre: First-person shooter
- Modes: Single-player, multiplayer

Tron 2.0 is a 2003 first-person shooter video game developed by Monolith Productions and published by Buena Vista Interactive. Based on Disney's science fiction franchise Tron, the game is a sequel to the original 1982 film of the same name. However, Tron 2.0 is set in an alternate continuity from later entries in the franchise; its events were retconned by the plot of Tron: Legacy, the canon sequel to the original film. The Microsoft Windows version of Tron 2.0 was released in August 2003. The Mac OS X version was released by MacPlay on April 21, 2004. Two unique ports for the Xbox and Game Boy Advance (GBA), both titled Tron 2.0: Killer App but containing many differences, were released later in 2004.

Jason Cottle voices the player character Jethro "Jet" Bradley, the son of ENCOM programmer Alan Bradley (voiced by Bruce Boxleitner, who reprises his role from the original film). Cindy Morgan, who also starred in Tron, voices the artificial intelligence known as Ma3a. Rebecca Romijn provides the voice of Mercury. The game features a new Light Cycle design by Syd Mead and provides explanations for both the Tron arcade game (which makes an appearance in this game) and Kevin Flynn's experiences inside the ENCOM mainframe (as shown in the original film).

Upon release, the Windows and Mac OS X versions of Tron 2.0 were generally praised by many video game critics and publications. The game's first-person shooter elements were well-received, and it was especially commended for its innovative art design, graphics, and overall atmosphere. The Light Cycle segments in particular were highlighted by many reviewers; the vehicles' gameplay in Tron 2.0 was considered highly faithful to their depiction in the 1982 film. However, in comparison to Tron 2.0, Tron 2.0: Killer App for the Xbox and GBA largely received mixed to average reviews from critics.

== Gameplay ==
In addition to being primarily a first-person shooter, Tron 2.0 features the franchise's Light Cycle segments.

Tron 2.0 plays primarily as a first-person shooter. Gameplay takes place inside various computers, such as mainframes and a personal digital assistant (PDA), while some cutscenes are in the ENCOM research laboratory outside the computer world. Levels are linear in format. The goal of each level is generally to complete tasks and find keys, known as permission bits that allow access to the next level. While searching for these bits, the protagonist Jet can find upgrades and lore surrounding the game's world.

Jet begins the game with his Identity Disc, which is used for both storing data and combat. The disc is the same format featured in the films, and when thrown can bounce off enemies and objects, but always returns to its owner. Jet can also acquire computerized, sci-fi versions of real-life weapons, such as a shotgun, submachine gun, sniper rifle, and hand grenades. Each weapon aside from the disc uses energy as ammunition, which can be collected at various points in the game.

Jet's abilities are customizable, as his in-computer program earns version upgrades — when earning a level, Jet 0.0.0 becomes Jet 0.0.1, and so on. He acquires new abilities, and also the aforementioned weapons, in the form of subroutines held in archive bins scattered around the levels, but has a limited number of memory slots in which to install these subroutines onto his person. Subroutines start out as alpha-grade software, but can be upgraded to beta and gold statuses, similar to a software release life cycle. Status upgrades both take up less space in memory and become more effective. The layout of Jet's memory slots changes from level to level, with immovable "base code" taking up various slots and limiting the number and size of the abilities Jet can equip. When attacked by viruses, subroutines can become fragmented or infected and cannot be used until Jet repairs them. If Jet encounters a program unknown to him, he can import one of its unique abilities to his own system.

As he moves through the levels, Jet must engage many lower-tier enemies. Although none are particularly powerful, they usually appear in gangs, making them more of a threat. Among the regular levels, there are some with boss enemies. Interspersed with the first-person shooter levels are several Light Cycle races. As seen in the film, these races are actually arena duels in which each Light Cycle attempts to destroy its opponents by driving them into its jetwall. The arenas contain improvements, such as speed zones that affect the cycles' speed, more complex layouts with walls and other artifacts, and power-ups that can be collected during races. In addition to the original Light Cycle from Tron, Jet can also gain access to the new Super Light Cycle, which sports a more modern design and offers a higher speed.

Tron 2.0 offers some multiplayer scenarios, both in campaign mode and in light cycle mode. Internet and LAN play are available, although the vendor does not recommend that the Light Cycle mode be used over the Internet due to its generally high lag. Multiplayer on Xbox Live was available to players until April 15, 2010. Tron 2.0 is now playable online again on the replacement Xbox Live servers called Insignia.

== Setting ==
The game, like the film, is set "inside" a computer. Areas within the game feature glowing neon-colored highlights similar to the original film's aesthetic, with colors denoting the type and general ambiance of the system — for example, part of the story takes place in the flaming red environment of a firewall, while a PDA is colored plain white. Levels contain such features as energy bridges and gates, floating boxes and tiles, teleport spots, and deep chasms. Jet can take damage (or even die) by falling from too great a height, and can also be crushed by falling objects and moving platforms.

Like the film, Tron 2.0 uses many computing conventions to explain in-game events, characters, weapons, and other phenomena. For example, the player can battle viruses while fleeing a system format, and wield a sniper rifle known as the LOL, additionally amplifying its damage with a skill called Megahurtz. Programs in the systems bear various names based on their functions, including names based on their creators (like Brian.exe), system tools (e.g. servwatch.exe), parodies of popular software (e.g. reelplyr.exe and netscope.exe), and viruses and malware scripts (HA-HA-HA-0X0->???, Durandal and (Ra*mpa^ncy) — the latter two being references to Marathon). Datawraiths, which are in essence digitized humans, feature email addresses such as AndyG@fcon.net and GeoffK@fcon.net. Jet can also find and read email messages in certain systems, which partly reveal the game's background story, but also provide insight into the relationships between Alan, Jet, and Ma3a.

=== Plot ===
The plot of Tron 2.0 centers around Alan Bradley's son Jethro "Jet" Bradley. Since the events of Tron, ENCOM has been taken over by a company called FCon (Future Control Industries). During a phone conversation between Jet and his father, Alan is kidnapped. Ma3a, an artificial intelligence designed by Alan, digitizes Jet into Alan's computer. She informs Jet that she needs him to aid her against J.D. Thorne, an executive from FCon who attempted to digitize himself into the computer as well, but became corrupted during the process and turned into a virus spreading throughout the system.

Upon arriving, Jet is captured by Kernel, the system's security program, and is accused of being the source of the corruption. However, Kernel spares Jet on the recommendation of Mercury, a program also tasked to help Ma3a, and sends Jet to the Light Cyclearena. After winning several matches, Jet escapes the arena with Mercury's help. After the two reunite with Ma3a, the server is reformatted due to its rampant corruption, which results in Mercury's demise. Jet escapes to the original ENCOM grid with Ma3a and accesses an archive with the help of an antiquated program, I-No, to retrieve the source code for "Tron Legacy", an update to the original TRON that Alan wrote to protect Ma3a. Jet and Ma3a then access the Internet and find a compiler, which they use to begin compiling the Tron Legacy source code. During the process, Thorne attacks them and appears to kill Ma3a, while Jet receives a communication from Guest, the User who had assigned Mercury to help him. Accessing a video uplink, Jet sees his father trapped inside a storage closet, who holds up a sign telling him to not compile the Legacy program. However, the compile finishes before Jet can abort it, and Legacy activates, revealing that its sole function is to kill all rogue Users in the digital world. Jet escapes in a Light Cycle, and FCon inadvertently saves him by capturing Ma3a with a Seeker search program.

Having recovered the correction algorithms necessary to digitize a human, Alan is sent to Thorne's corrupted server and assists Kernel and his ICPs (Intrusion Countermeasure Programs). Meanwhile, Jet finds Thorne at the heart of the server and confronts Kernel in a duel that ends in Kernel's destruction before he can kill Thorne. Thorne, in a moment of lucidity, begs Jet for forgiveness and tells him how to enter FCon's server before he dissipates.

Alan and Jet break into FCon's server, which the corporation is planning to use to distribute Datawraiths — digitized human hackers — across the worldwide information network for purposes of corporate and international espionage. After Alan and Jet crash the server, the CEO of FCon (which the game implies could be Ed Dillinger, the ENCOM senior executive from the original film) orders Baza, Popoff, and Crowne into the system themselves. Alan, wanting to verify the purity of the correction algorithms, removes them from Ma3a to inspect them. As a result, when the three FCon employees are digitized, they become a monstrous amalgam that chases Jet into the digitizing beam. Jet battles the monster amalgam and ejects the employees out of the beam, releasing their code from the corruption one by one. Severing the CEO's control, Alan and Jet extract and save the Tron Legacy code as the ENCOM servers crash. The game ends with Alan planning to reassemble the digitized FCon team and bring them back to the real world.

== Reception ==
Reception

Aggregate scores
Aggregator	Score			
Aggregator	GBA	mobile	PC	Xbox
GameRankings	67%	(LC) 70% (DoT) 61%	84%	71%
Metacritic	68/100		84/100	69/100

Review scores
Publication	Score			
Publication	GBA	mobile	PC	Xbox
Eurogamer			9/10	6/10
GameRevolution			B+	C+
GameSpot	6.1/10	(LC) 6.9/10 (DoT) 4.2/10	7.1/10	6.7/10
GameSpy	3/5		4.5/5	3.5/5
IGN	7.8/10	(DoT) 8/10 (LC) 7/10	8/10	7.8/10
Nintendo Power	3.7/5			
Official Xbox Magazine (US)				6.9/10
PC Gamer (US)			91%	
The Cincinnati Enquirer			4.5/5	
The Times				3/5

The PC version received "favorable" reviews, while the Game Boy Advance and Xbox versions received "average" reviews, according to the review aggregation website Metacritic.

The Cincinnati Enquirer gave the PC version four-and-a-half stars out of five and said: "Whether or not you're a fan of the movie, TRON 2.0 oozes with style and substance. Developer Monolith Productions deserves credit for creating one of the finest and most unique PC games of the year to date". Maxim gave the same console version a score of eight out of ten and called it "a must for those out there who still like their CGI old school". However, The Times gave the Xbox version three stars out of five, saying that "the controls take some time to master, and there's a surfeit of useless jargon seemingly designed to prevent you getting to grips with the gameplay. Nor is this a game for the short-sighted, since the on-screen captions that supposedly offer guidance are minute and virtually illegible".

Despite the positive reviews, the PC version underperformed in sales, and BVG eventually dropped support for the game two years after it was released. Despite the lack of support from BVG, additional levels and multiplayer maps have been developed by fans of the game, including an expansion game and modification.

Slave Labor Graphics produced a Tron 2.0 comic book sequel miniseries called Tron: The Ghost in the Machine.

Computer Games Magazine named Tron 2.0 the fourth-best computer game of 2003, and presented it with awards for "Best Sound Effects" and "Best Art Direction", the latter of which it shared with Uru: Ages Beyond Myst. The editors called Tron 2.0 "easily one of the year's best looking games, and a textbook example of how graphics rely just as much on art design as they do technology". The editors of Computer Gaming World nominated Tron 2.0 for their 2003 "Shooter of the Year" and overall "Game of the Year" awards, which ultimately went to Call of Duty and Knights of the Old Republic, respectively. It was also nominee for PC Gamer US's 2003 "Best Action Game" award, although it lost again to Call of Duty. The editors declared it "a movie license done right". During the 7th Annual Interactive Achievement Awards, the Academy of Interactive Arts & Sciences nominated Tron 2.0 for "Computer First-Person Action Game of the Year" and "Outstanding Innovation in Computer Gaming".

In 2009, GamesRadar ranked the game third on their list of the seven best Disney games, saying "Not to discount the gorgeousness of 2.0’s neon lined environments, nor the wonderfully tech savvy 1337 speak [...] but the Light Cycle arenas remain the game’s crown jewel. All the nausea-inducing camera angles and impossible turns of Tron’s deadly game of competitive Snake were preserved, and you could bring the action online where it ran like a fanboy fever dream."

== Ports ==
In addition to the Mac, the game was ported to mobile phones in two versions: the first version, called Tron 2.0: Light Cycles, was released on November 21, 2003; the second version, called Tron 2.0: Discs of Tron, was released on May 12, 2004.

Tron 2.0 was later ported to the Xbox and Game Boy Advance and retitled Tron 2.0: Killer App. The Xbox version saw numerous changes to the single-player and multiplayer modes. Changes to the single-player story mode include optional jumping sequences and overall console-tailored controls. The most significant changes in the Xbox port involved the multiplayer modes. The multiplayer modes available in the Xbox version of Tron 2.0: Killer App support up to sixteen players and include disc arena, Light Cycles, and overRide, all of which require system link or Xbox Live. The new overRide mode allows for first-person gameplay with the ability to ride Light Cycles at any time.

Tron 2.0: Killer App for the Game Boy Advance has a different story and gameplay elements from its Xbox counterpart of the same name. For example, in this port, the player instead explores the game's story levels as either Tron himself (following his victory over the Master Control Program in the original 1982 film) or Mercury. Unlike many GBA games, Tron 2.0: Killer App features a substantial amount of voice-acted dialogue; Tron is once again portrayed by Bruce Boxleitner, while Rebecca Romijn continues to provide the voice of Mercury. The majority of the game is played from an isometric perspective as the player controls either Tron or Mercury through each level; there are also a variety of different puzzles and 3D-rendered vehicle segments distributed throughout the game. The GBA port of Tron 2.0: Killer App also features a variety of different minigames, including the 1982 Tron arcade game and Discs of Tron.

A version of Tron 2.0 was planned for the Gizmondo, but was cancelled during development.
