= Space Paranoids =

2009 video game

- Developer: 42 Entertainment
- Publisher: Disney Interactive
- Series: Tron
- Platform: Arcade
- Release: July 23, 2009 (Flynn's Arcade - Comic Con); May 6th, 2010 (Online)
- Genre: Action-adventure
- Modes: Single-player, Multiplayer

Space Paranoids is a fictional first-person shooter arcade game appearing in the 1982 film Tron. It was created by Kevin Flynn, but the code was stolen and released by the company Encom and Ed Dillinger.

== In real life ==
Space Paranoids was recreated in real life on two occasions as promotional material for the 2010 film Tron: Legacy. An arcade version was designed by 42 Entertainment for the 2009 San Diego Comic-Con. A second version was released online in 2010.

== Gameplay ==
The object of the game is to go through the levels and score as many points as possible by destroying Recognizers, tanks, and stationary gun turrets. The controls of the arcade version are a joystick and a trackball.

== Technical details ==
The game is based on the Unity game engine which allows it to run from the browser, provided that the appropriate browser extension is installed. The default controls for the online version are a keyboard and mouse, but if it is downloaded to play offline, it is possible to configure it for joystick support, full screen and custom resolutions.

Space Paranoids opened online on May 6, 2010.
