= Tron (video game) =

1982 video game

- North American arcade flyer
- Developer: Bally Midway
- Publisher: Bally Midway
- Designer: Bill Adams
- Programmer: Bill Adams
- Composer: Earl Vickers
- Series: Tron
- Platform: Arcade
- Release: NA: August 1982
- Genres: Action, snake
- Modes: Single-player, multiplayer
- Arcade system: Midway MCR-II

Tron is a 1982 action video game developed and published by Bally Midway for arcades, based on the Disney film of the same name. The lead programmer was Bill Adams with Earl Vickers programming the music.

The game was a major success, with approximately 10,000 arcade cabinets sold, and was awarded "Coin-Operated Game of the Year" by Electronic Games. A number of other licensed Tron games were released for home systems, but were based directly on elements of the film and not the arcade game. In 1983, Tron was followed by Discs of Tron, an arcade sequel which was not as successful.

== Gameplay ==
Tron consists of four sub-games based on events and characters in the movie. In general, the player controls Tron, either in human form or piloting a vehicle, using an eight-way joystick for movement, a trigger button on the stick to fire (or slow down the player's light cycle), and a rotary dial for aiming. The goal of the game is to score points and advance through the game's twelve levels by completing each of the sub-games. Most of the 12 levels are named after programming languages: RPG, COBOL, BASIC, FORTRAN, SNOBOL, PL1, PASCAL, ALGOL, ASSEMBLY, OS, JCL, and USER. The game supports two players alternating.

At the start of each level, the player is taken to a "Game Grid" selection screen divided into four quadrants. The player must choose a quadrant, each of which corresponds to a different sub-game. The sub-game in each quadrant is not known to the player until it is selected. If the player fails the game and loses a life, they are taken back to this selection screen and an icon representing that game is now visible. Failure to choose a quadrant before an on-screen timer runs out results in a sub-game being chosen at random. Once the player completes a particular sub-game, it is taken out of play until the start of the next level.

The sub-games are as follows:

I/O Tower

The player must guide Tron to the flashing circle of an Input/Output Tower within a set time limit while avoiding or destroying Grid Bugs. This game is based on the I/O Tower scene in the film, while adding the Grid Bugs as enemies (which were only briefly mentioned in the film). A bit occasionally appears on the screen and can be picked up for bonus points.

MCP Cone

The player must break through a rotating shield wall protecting the MCP cone and enter the cone without touching any of the shield blocks. This game is based on Tron's final battle with the MCP in the film, but changes the nature of the MCP's shield. Bonus points are awarded for destroying every block in the shield.

Light Cycles

In a player-vs-AI variant of the Snake game concept, the player guides Tron's blue Light Cycle in an arena against one or more yellow opponents. The objective is to force the enemy cycles to crash into walls, jet trails, or each other, while simultaneously avoiding them. When an enemy cycle crashes, both it and its trail disappear. This game is based on the Light Cycle Arena sequence in the film, though the colors of the friendly and enemy characters are reversed. This is the only sub-game in Tron to not use the rotary dial.

Battle Tanks

The player must guide Tron's red battle tank through a maze and destroy all of the opposing blue enemy tanks by shooting each of them three times. The tank can warp to a random location in the maze by moving into a diamond in the center, and its shots bounce off walls or obstructions until reaching their maximum travel distance. In higher difficulty levels, the enemy tanks are replaced by red Recognizers that are much faster and attempt to collide with the player's tank instead of shooting at it. This game is not based on any particular scene, but is rather based on Tank Program elements, including Clu's failed intrusion into the ENCOM mainframe and the "Space Paranoids" game featured at the beginning of the film.

== Development ==
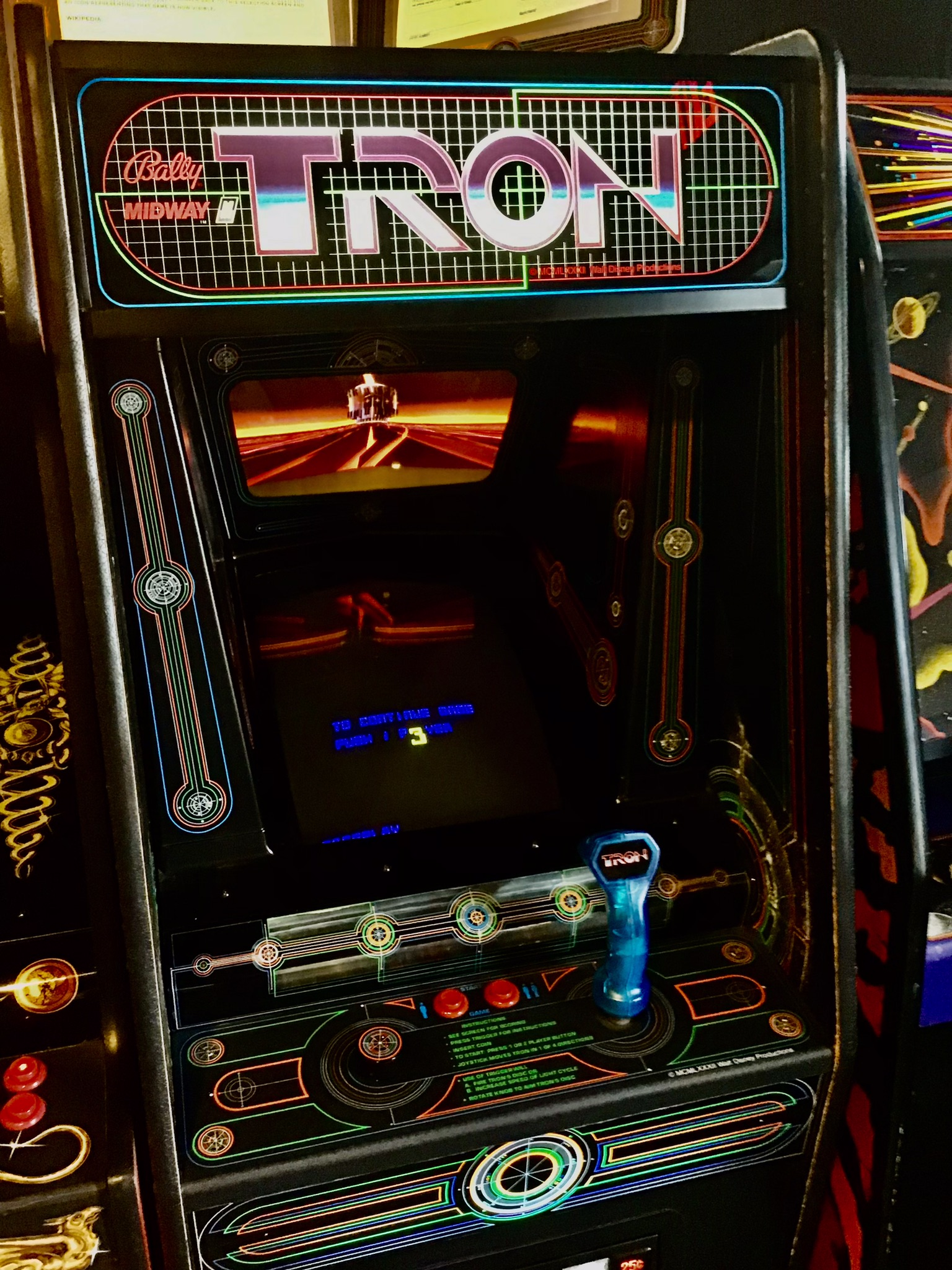
Tron arcade machine

Bally Midway had two different design teams submit pitches for the game. One team led by Dave Nutting planned a first-person vector graphics game, while the second team suggested a collection of five minigames using existing Bally Midway technology; the second proposal was used because it had a better chance of being completed by the deadline. One of the five minigames was ultimately left out due to the time constraints.

== Reception ==
Tron was awarded "Coin-Operated Game of the Year" by Electronic Games magazine.

The New York Times reported that 800 arcade cabinets were sold in 1982. By January 1983, it was fourth on the RePlay arcade charts. The book The Naked Computer reported that Tron made $45,000,000 by 1983. In USgamer's estimation 10,000 cabinets were sold and the game made more than $30,000,000 in revenue by 1983. In 1995, Flux magazine wrote, "Even many of today's coin-ops can't compete with the mighty Tron."

== Records ==
The world record high score for Tron was set in July 2011 by David Cruz of Brandon, Florida. Cruz scored 14,007,645 points based on Twin Galaxies rules and settings for the game.

== Legacy ==
Discs of Tron (1983) is an arcade game which was originally intended as a fifth segment of Tron, but was left out because programming was not finished in time. In it, the player engages in disc throwing combat, similar to the film sequence.

Two clones of the game, ElecTron (1984) and Kron (1983), were released for the TRS-80 Color Computer.

The light cycle segment of Tron has led to snake games sometimes being called "Light Cycle" games, despite the concept dating from 1976. Some post-Tron snake games use themes or terminology from the film.

The 2004 Game Boy Advance game Tron 2.0: Killer App contains ports of the original Tron and Discs of Tron arcade games.

Tron was released for Xbox Live Arcade in January 2008, ported by Digital Eclipse and published by Disney Interactive.

A miniature Tron arcade cabinet showing a looping video of the game's attract screens is a mod that can be used to replace the supplied version in the Tron: Legacy pinball machine, released in 2011 by Stern Pinball.

In October 2021, Arcade1Up released a recreated cabinet of the original Tron arcade game.
