= Tron: Maze-A-Tron =

1982 video game

- Developer: Mattel Electronics
- Publisher: Mattel Electronics
- Designer: Russ Haft
- Series: Tron
- Platform: Intellivision
- Release: October 6, 1982
- Genres: Action; Side-scrolling
- Mode: Single-player

Tron: Maze-A-Tron (Tron: Le Labyrinthe or Le Labyrinthe de Tron in editions intended for French-speaking markets) is a 1982 action video game developed and published by Mattel Electronics for the Intellivision. It is the second of three Intellivision games based on the Disney film Tron. The player takes the role of Kevin Flynn, a young programmer transported into the heart of a computer to find and dismantle the power-hungry MCP that is trying to control the human race. The game design and programming was done by Russ Haft, with graphics by Eric Wells.

== Gameplay ==
The game is played using the Intellivision's controller. The directional pad is used to move Flynn or the rifle's crosshairs. A game consists of several rounds. Each round has two phases: Phase I (the Maze) and Phase II (the MCP).

- Phase I: Flynn must navigate a maze symbolizing the computer's internal circuits, accumulating energy to "reset the RAM chips", with the screen scrolling sideways on its own. Along the way, he encounters various "computer chips" that are bonuses, penalties, or dangers to be avoided. The player can also change the direction the screen moves by entering a "flip-flop". Recognizers, vessels from the film that embody the computer's defense system, patrol the area and chase Flynn if he comes too close.
- Phase II: Flynn faces the MCP and must throw his identification disc at pairs of bits that are compatible with numbers shown in the upper corners of the screen. He must identify the correct "bit pairs" and "turn them black" by throwing his disc, while The MCP will try to hit the player with laser beams coming out of its eyes. There is a limited number of times the player can be hit, which occurs when Flynn forgets to activate his shield.

The game then restarts at Phase I with increased difficulty, which is continuous for as long as the game is played.

== Development and release ==
Like Tron: Deadly Discs, Tron: Maze-A-Tron was developed in parallel with the production of the Disney film Tron. Russ Haft was responsible for the design and programming, while the graphics were created by Eric Wells, and the sound effects were created by Andy Sells. The package illustration was made by Jerrol Richardson.

The development teams for the three Tron games had access to the rushes and the film before its theatrical release in order to draw inspiration from it.

Tron: Maze-A-Tron was released on October 6, 1982 in the US market, shortly after the film, becoming Mattel's 39th title for the Intellivision console.

== Reception ==
Reception

Review scores
Publication	Score
Tilt	5/6 stars
Electronic Fun with Computers & Games	2.5/4
TeleMatch	4/6

The complexity of the gameplay, requiring a lengthy user manual (25 pages) and the introduction of several computer and electronics terms (input/output, bus, microchips, binary code, RAM, resistors, stack, etc.) to fit in with the film's universe, may have put players off. Electronic Fun with Computers & Games found the game boring, despite its exceptional graphics, and ironically pointed out that the real challenge of a game should lie in its gameplay and not in understanding its instruction manual.

Electronic Games, on the other hand, praised Mattel for the game, which requires several training sessions to master.
