= Tron: Identity =

- Developer: Bithell Games
- Publisher: Bithell Games
- Director: Mike Bithell
- Producers: Rachael Rose; Heidy Vargas
- Programmers: Hanah Rose; Alex Darby; Sam Febvre
- Writers: Mike Bithell; Christopher R. Painter
- Composer: Dan le Sac
- Series: Tron
- Engine: Unity
- Platforms: macOS; Nintendo Switch; Windows
- Release: WW: April 11, 2023
- Genres: Visual novel, puzzle
- Mode: Single-player

Tron: Identity is a 2023 visual novel puzzle game developed and published by Bithell Games based on the Tron franchise. Set thirteen years after the film Tron: Legacy (2010), the player follows Query, a program who investigates an explosion in The Repository, a building in a backup Grid created by programmer Kevin Flynn intended to house ISOs. His investigation leads him down a path that uncovers many secrets about the world he and other programs inhabit.

Tron: Identity received mixed reception, with many critics praising the story and graphics, but criticized the game's short length.

== Gameplay ==
Players control Query, a sentient program who lives in a virtual world. His job is to determine what caused an explosion in a secure vault. Players encounter other virtual inhabitants and can engage them in conversation. Choices players make in these conversations affect the story. While talking to people, players occasionally need to solve a matching game puzzle to ask further questions.

== Development ==
As a fan of both Tron and Disney parks, Mike Bithell said he said he enjoyed the opportunity to ask Disney writers for their thoughts when he wrote the game. Bithell Games released Tron: Identity on Windows, macOS, and Nintendo Switch on April 11, 2023.

== Reception ==
Reception

Aggregate score
Aggregator	Score
Metacritic	(PC) 67/100 (NS) 74/100

Review score
Publication	Score
IGN	7/10

Tron: Identity received mixed reviews on Metacritic. IGN said it is "well worth playing" but "feels more like a first chapter than a standalone story". Though they called it "beautiful and brilliant in spots", Slant Magazine felt it was "too much like reading a rulebook". The Guardian praised the atmosphere and flexible story, but they said that without its license, it is "a fleeting and unremarkable visual novel". Polygon praised the "dramatically stimulating and entertaining story" and recommended it to both Tron fans and newcomers. GameSpot enjoyed the writing, atmosphere, and world-building, but they felt the game was too short and that the puzzles were too much of an interruption. While praising the game's "unique structure", Game Informer said they did not feel engrossed in the virtual people's problems.
