= Tron: The Ghost in the Machine =

Comic book series

- Tron: The Ghost in the Machine #1. Art by Louie De Martinis.

Publication information
- Publisher: Slave Labor Graphics
- Schedule: Irregular
- Format: Limited series
- Genre: Science fiction
- Publication date: April 2006 – September 2008
- No. of issues: 6

Creative team
- Written by: Landry Walker; Eric Jones
- Artist(s): Louie De Martinis (issues 1-2); Michael Shoyket (issues 3-6); GURU-eFX (issues 3-6)

Collected editions
- Softcover: ISBN 978-1-59362-102-5

Tron: The Ghost in the Machine is a six-issue comic book miniseries produced by Slave Labor Graphics. It continues the storyline of the film Tron and the video game Tron 2.0.

== Production notes ==
In 2005, Slave Labor Graphics announced its comic, Tron: The Ghost in the Machine, a six issue miniseries depicting the adventures of Jet Bradley. The book had an irregular publishing schedule, spanning from April 2006 to September 2008. A trade paperback collecting all six issues was released in July 2009. The comic book was written by Landry Walker and Eric Jones, with art in the first two issues by Louie De Martinis. The artist on the remainder of the series was Mike Shoyket.

== Storyline ==
The story revolves around a program that believes itself to be a User named Jet Bradley, son of the original Tron programmer Alan Bradley. This version of Jet is a backup copy of the real Jet Bradley, who explored the digital universe in Tron 2.0. He has been split into three distinct aspects, represented by color (red, blue and green), all at war with each other. Eventually the fractured program of Jet converges into one being, resulting in a white "User" version. The program then comes face to face with his User and is given a chance, using the Tron Legacy code integrated into his identity disk as a key, to be transferred into the real world. The unified Jet declines, as his presence is the only thing keeping the digital universe he exists within stable and his exiting would mean the "death" of everyone he knows within the computer. He releases the Tron Legacy code from his disk and restores the digital world, accepting his life as a computer program.

== See also ==
- Tron (franchise) § Comics
