= Tron: Uprising (soundtrack) =

Tron: Uprising (Music from and Inspired by the Series)

Soundtrack album by Joseph Trapanese
- Released: January 8, 2013
- Recorded: 2012
- Genres: Electronic; orchestral
- Length: 1:15:50
- Label: Walt Disney

Tron: Uprising (Music from and Inspired by the Series) (Note: also marketed as TRON: Uprising (Music from and Inspired by the Series)) is the soundtrack album to the 2013 Disney XD television series Tron: Uprising released through Walt Disney Records on January 8, 2013. The series' score is composed by Joseph Trapanese.

== Background ==
Joseph Trapanese, who arranged and orchestrated Daft Punk's score for Tron: Legacy (2010), composed the series' score. Having liked Wendy Carlos' score for Tron (1982) and Daft Punk's for Tron: Legacy, Trapanese wanted to incorporate those elements into the score and transition them into a show, in a unique way. Since the work on the series commenced even before the film, Trapanese took one-and-a-half year to curate the sonic ideas, and develop new themes and textures, and it made him efficient to compose for an episode as much of the work had been done. He watched each episode twice to understand the dialogues and note the sound effects and also discussed with director Charlie Bean on what he wanted to convey to the audience through this show.

Trapanese then wrote music for each episode within 3–5 days and then sketched his ideas through piano, before using orchestras and synthesizers to produce unique and interesting sounds that could become additional elements. He also made use of percussion, which were familiar sounds in the franchise, and electric guitars, along with new musical elements that added layers to the sonic palette. Trapanese liked to have an old-fashioned way of writing themes for individual characters, but because most of modern film scoring is about the lack of themes, he tried composing themes that did not have thematic material in them, to make the points when the thematic materials were even stronger. At certain instances, he would discuss with the director or agree with his ideas on providing musical inputs.

== Release ==
The soundtrack for Tron: Uprising was made available for pre-order on various digital platforms and online retail stores by December 2012. It was then released digitally and manufacture on demand CD by Walt Disney Records on January 8, 2013.

== Track listing ==
No.	Title	Length
1.	"Beck's Theme – Lightbike Battle"	3:57
2.	"Tesler Throwdown"	4:13
3.	"Paige's Past"	3:53
4.	"Lux's Sacrifice"	4:51
5.	"Price Of Power"	5:01
6.	"Rescuing The Rebellion"	3:07
7.	"Dyson Drops In ("Scars" Suite)"	2:11
8.	"Tron's Promise ("Scars" Suite)"	4:42
9.	"Tron's Turn ("Scars" Suite)"	2:22
10.	"Beck Betrayed ("Scars" Suite)"	1:43
11.	"Torture ("Scars" Suite)"	3:33
12.	"Revenge ("Scars" Suite)"	2:41
13.	"Redemption ("Scars" Suite)"	3:29
14.	"Goodbye Renegade"	2:24
15.	"Compressed Space"	5:53
16.	"Renegade's Pledge – End Credits"	1:52
17.	"Lightbike Battle" (3OH!3 and JT Remix)	4:43
18.	"Inferno" (Opiuo Remix)	5:07
19.	"Dyson" (David Hiller Remix)	5:00
20.	"Rezolution" (performed by Cole Plante)	5:00
Total length:		1:15:50

== Reception ==
Justin D. Williams at Otakus & Geeks wrote "TRON Uprising is a must get for TRON fans and people who love OST from movies/television. The soundtrack plays it safe but gives you enough to give its own identity. The tracks can feel dark, intense and emotional which all relates to the darker tone world of TRON Uprising." Aidan Fortune of SFcrowsnest wrote "Joseph Trapanese does make the soundtrack more accessible to the casual listener but perhaps compromises some individuality in doing so. Some of the earlier tracks on the album are a tad passive and could do with a bit of oomph." Mike Gencarelli of Mediamikes wrote "This album is not Daft Punk’s TRON: Legacy score but it takes aspect from that and expanded its reach into the Grid. If you are a fan of this series, then you have heard the score throughout the season so far." Heather Phares of AllMusic described it a "fascinating album".

For the pilot episode, Cameron K McEwan of Den of Geek wrote "Two very special mentions must go to the score from Joseph Trapanese, who lifts the amazing Daft Punk sounds from the recent cinema outing and embeds them with some elegance, and the stunning visuals. Matching the beauty of the sounds is some mighty delightful artistry and an immensely pleasing style." Similarly, Cindy White of IGN stated "For fans of the Daft Punk soundtrack from Tron: Legacy there's good news and bad news. The bad news is that the duo was not directly involved in creating the music for the show. The good news is that Joseph Trapanese, who arranged the film's score, is the composer here. He works in some of the recognizable electronic themes with just enough of a twist to make them original to the series. It's a lively touch that creates an atmospheric connection to the franchise." Kevin Yeoman of Screen Rant wrote "Throw in a rich, moody score by Joe Trapanese that is at once reminiscent of Batman Begins while still very much embedded in the TRON universe".

== Extended plays ==
Trapanese later digitally released two extended plays for the show featuring additional tracks not heard on the initial product: Tron: Uprising – Hero EP in 2015 and Tron: Uprising – Occupied EP in 2020.

Hero EP
No.	Title	Length
1.	"Saving the Grid"	7:12
2.	"A Hero's Challenge"	3:32
3.	"Tessler's Twist"	1:31
4.	"The Games"	5:36
5.	"Lost Cause"	2:01
6.	"Club Infestation"	1:06
7.	"Zed Dances"	1:23
8.	"Tessler's Party"	2:59
9.	"Program vs Program" (Bayonne Remix)	3:15
Total length:		28:35

Occupied EP
No.	Title	Length
1.	"Occupied"	4:17
2.	"Pergos"	4:50
3.	"Pavel's Playtime"	5:28
4.	"End Titles"	0:30
5.	"Tagging"	1:37
6.	"Darazzed"	1:34
7.	"Zombie Club"	3:23
Total length:		21:39
