= Tron Lightcycle Power Run =

Launched roller coaster

Tron Lightcycle Power Run Chinese: 创极速光轮

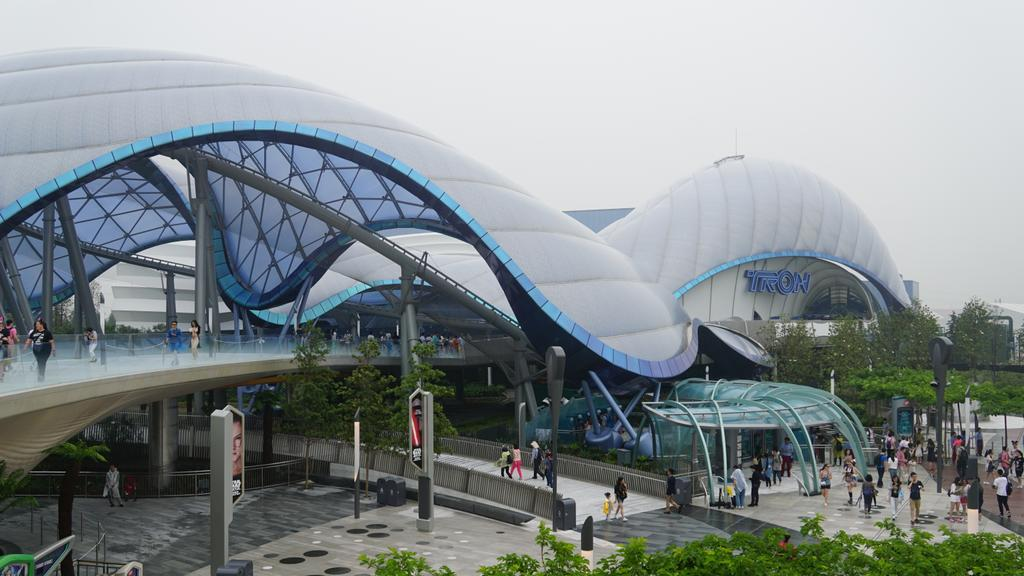

Shanghai Disneyland
- Park section: Tomorrowland
- Coordinates: 31.1437282°N 121.6525508°E
- Status: Operating
- Opening date: June 16, 2016
- Tron Lightcycle Power Run; Chinese: 创极速光轮 at Shanghai Disneyland at RCDB

Magic Kingdom
- Name: TRON Lightcycle / Run
- Park section: Tomorrowland
- Coordinates: 28.4205°N 81.5767°W
- Status: Operating
- Soft opening date: February 3, 2023
- Opening date: April 4, 2023
- TRON Lightcycle / Run at Magic Kingdom at RCDB

General statistics
- Type: Steel – Launched
- Manufacturer: Vekoma
- Designer: Walt Disney Imagineering
- Model: Motorbike roller coaster
- Lift/launch system: LSM launch
- Height: 78.1 ft (23.8 m)
- Length: 3,169.3 ft (966.0 m)
- Speed: 59.3 mph (95.4 km/h)
- Inversions: 0
- Duration: ~1:00
- Capacity: 1,680 riders per hour
- G-force: 4
- Height restriction: 4 ft (122 cm)
- Trains: 7 trains with 7 cars; riders arranged 2 across in a single row for a total of 14 riders per train
- Theme: Tron
- Sponsor: Chevrolet (Shanghai); Enterprise Rent-A-Car (Magic Kingdom)
- Music: Daft Punk; Joseph Trapanese; Nine Inch Nails (2025–2026 Tron: Ares overlay)
- Lightning Lane at Magic Kingdom available
- Disney Premier Access at Shanghai Disneyland available
- Must transfer from wheelchair

Tron Lightcycle Power Run (stylized as TRON Lightcycle Power Run; Chinese: 创极速光轮) and Tron Lightcycle / Run (stylized as TRON Lightcycle / Run) are semi-enclosed, launched roller coasters at Shanghai Disneyland and at Magic Kingdom in Walt Disney World. Based on the Tron franchise, the first incarnation opened at Shanghai Disneyland on June 16, 2016. A nearly identical installation opened at Magic Kingdom in Walt Disney World on April 4, 2023. Both are in the Tomorrowland themed areas at each park.

Inspired primarily by the second film, Tron: Legacy (2010), the attraction features a motorbike seat design themed as lightcycles from the films. Each coaster reaches a maximum speed of nearly 60 mph (97 km/h), taking riders on a series of twists and turns through a layout resembling the video game grid depicted in the film series.

== History ==
The Shanghai Disneyland ride debuted along with the rest of the park on June 16, 2016.

The Magic Kingdom version was first announced at the D23 Expo on July 15, 2017, as part of the unveiling of 23 improvements to Disney Parks, including 4 new rides across the theme parks. The ride's construction began in February 2018 with land clearing. It was originally scheduled to open for Walt Disney World's 50th anniversary in fall 2021, but due to the outbreak of the COVID-19 pandemic, the opening date had to be postponed. On September 11, 2022, it was announced at the D23 Expo that the Tron Lightcycle / Run attraction was scheduled to be opened by spring 2023, as part of the "Disney 100 Years of Wonder" celebration. On January 10, 2023, it was announced that the Magic Kingdom coaster would open on April 4, 2023. The ride had previews from February 6 to March 3, 2023, exclusively for Walt Disney World cast members.

In August 2025, during the Destination D23 showcase, it was announced that a new overlay inspired by Tron: Ares (featuring red lighting and music by Nine Inch Nails) would be coming to the attraction for a limited time beginning on September 15, 2025 at the Walt Disney World Resort and September 16, 2025 at the Shanghai Disney Resort. The overlay was ended on January 20, 2026, when the Florida version of the attraction returned to the regular version at Magic Kingdom. The Shanghai version also reverted back to the original in early 2026. In this version of the attraction, the Master Control Program has infected the system and demands guests to use the hijacked lightcycles to further spread his code through the Grid.

== Design ==
The attraction is located underneath a color-shifting canopy in Tomorrowland. The Magic Kingdom attraction is located in a section of Tomorrowland to the north of Space Mountain.

The coaster's track takes riders inside and outside the attraction's building, reaching a maximum speed of nearly 60 mph (97 km/h) – the fastest for any Disney roller coaster at the time of its opening in 2016.

The attraction's motorbike-style vehicles were created by Walt Disney Imagineering. The ride was given a Tron theme because the ride vehicles resembled the lightcycles featured in the Tron franchise. Riders lean forward and grip a set of handlebars; a pad behind the seat secures the rider in place. Additionally, some trains have modified seating on the back of the train for larger riders, which have traditional seating and restraints.

== Ride experience ==
=== Queue ===
First, guests start by going inside a corridor with circuitry-like patterns illuminated blue. Next, guests enter a room which holds the preshow. Inside, a video is projected onto a screen in front of them, and after being "digitized", the screen becomes transparent to reveal the launch. Guests then exit the preshow and continue through the queue. The queue continues with another room that shows the teams and the top users, Team Red, Team Yellow, Team Orange, and finally, Team Blue, the team that the guests are on. There are also monitors above explaining that all loose items must be stowed in the lockers and the boarding procedure. Then, after placing their items in the locker, guests proceed to the loading area where they board the lightcycles.

=== Experience ===
Riders synchronize themselves with their lightcycles and transport themselves into the world of Tron, plummeting onto a turbo-charged track known as the Grid. Team Blue will have to “race” against the other teams on a quest to capture eight “Energy Gates”, defeating the programs in order to survive the Power Run and escape back into the Real World.

Inside the experience, riders will be met with various soundtracks from the Tron franchise alongside flashing lights and 3-D graphics, illuminated glass rails, a real-time Raceview, and blue laser lights etched into the surroundings as they ride.

=== Layout ===
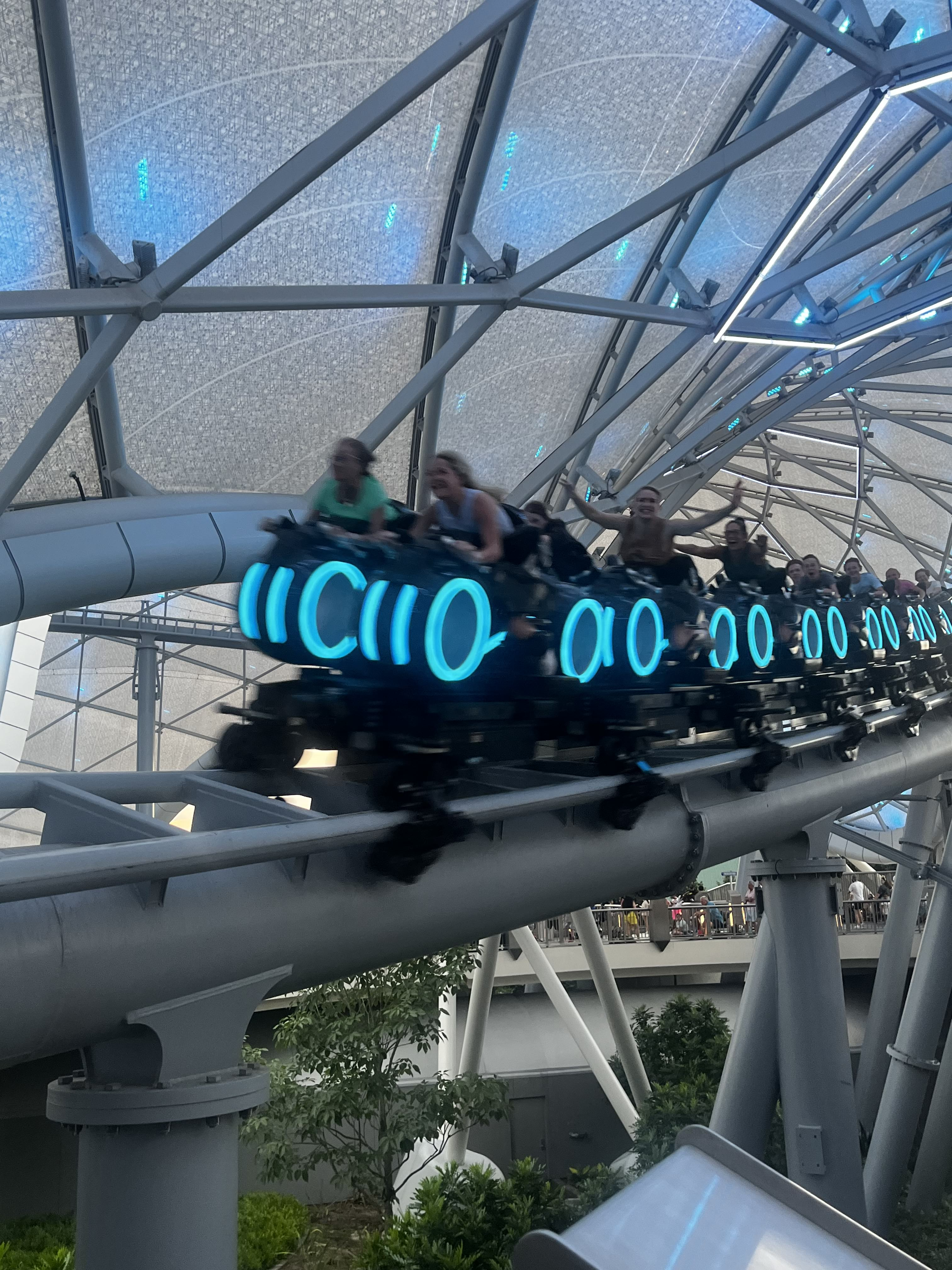
Guests riding Tron Lightcycle Run in Magic Kingdom

After being dispatched, the train makes a right turn to the launch. A voice is then heard saying, "Initiate in 3, 2, 1!" (In Shanghai Disneyland, "3、2、1，發射!") and then the train launches out of the building and underneath the canopy. This is where the on-ride photo is taken. The trains then enter the building again, then proceed to twist and turn along the grid, passing by the other lightcycles and capturing energy gates. Finally, the train proceeds to the brakes and enters the unloading area, ending the ride.

=== Exit ===
After disembarking, guests make their way to the other side of the lockers where they can grab loose items they placed inside the locker. Guests go through hallways and outside underneath the canopy. In the Magic Kingdom version, there is a small area at the exit welcoming "Team Green" users, which has not been in any of the films but is the brand color of the attraction sponsor Enterprise. There, it features the lightcycle from the green team and a wall showing statistics of team green, serving as a branded photo opportunity and additional promotion for the attraction sponsor.

== Reception/rankings ==
=== Golden ticket awards ===
Golden Ticket Awards: Top steel Roller Coasters
Year									1998	1999
Ranking									–	–
Year	2000	2001	2002	2003	2004	2005	2006	2007	2008	2009
Ranking	–	–	–	–	–	–	–	–	–	–
Year	2010	2011	2012	2013	2014	2015	2016	2017	2018	2019
Ranking	–	–	–	–	–	–	–	–	–	35
Year	2020	2021	2022	2023	2024	2025	2026			
Ranking	N/A	–	–	–	–	–	–			

=== Reception ===
The ride has been given mostly positive reviews, praised for its detail, theming, and launch. However, it has been criticized for its short ride duration.
