= Bonnie MacBird =

American writer

- Born: San Francisco, California, U.S.
- Occupations: Writer; actor; theatre director; voice artist
- Spouse: Alan Kay (m. 1983)
- Website: macbird.com

Bonnie MacBird is an American writer, actress and producer of screen, stage and prose. She co-wrote the science fiction film Tron.

MacBird is a native of San Francisco, California and graduated from Stanford University with a bachelor's degree in music and a master's degree in film. She is married to computer scientist Alan Kay.

== Film career ==
MacBird has spent most of her career in Hollywood as a screenwriter and producer. She wrote the original drafts of Tron and received a "story by" credit. She worked in feature film development for Universal Studios in the 1970s, won two Emmy Awards as a producer in the 1980s, and was, for ten years, the head of a firm called Creative License/SkyBird Productions. She has a number of acting and writing credits in Los Angeles theatre.

She continues to write, direct and act in theatre in Los Angeles and is a voice actor for SkyBoat Media.

== Novels ==
MacBird's recent career has focused on her Sherlock Holmes Adventure series for HarperCollins. Her first Sherlock Holmes novel, Art in The Blood, (2015) was followed by Unquiet Spirits (2017). A third, The Devil's Due, was released in 2019, followed by The Three Locks in 2021. Her fifth novel, What Child is This?: A Sherlock Holmes Christmas Adventure, appeared in 2022 and was illustrated by Frank Cho. 2025 saw the release of her sixth novel The Serpent Under.

== Teaching ==
She lectures regularly on writing, the creative process, and Sherlock Holmes. She taught screenwriting at UCLA Extension's Writer's Program for ten years, in a curriculum she designed which was inspired by her visual art, theatre, and music studies.
