= Light Cycle =

Fictional motorcycle

- Tron vehicle
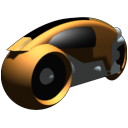
- Light Cycle (1st generation)
- First appearance: Tron
- Created by: Syd Mead

General characteristics
- Population volume: 1

The Light Cycle is a type of fictional motorcycle featured in the Tron franchise. First introduced in the film Tron, they are used as part of a deadly virtual game conducted by the villainous Master Control Program. In it, players must ride around an arena without crashing into each other, the outer walls, or the light trails (known as Jetwalls, and later, Light Ribbons) left behind by the vehicles. Subsequent generations of Light Cycles appeared in later works of media.

Following its appearance in Tron, the Light Cycle became a fixture of popular culture. The first Light Cycle sequence was also seen as a pioneering moment in computer graphics that inspired later works.

== Characteristics ==
Example of light trails created by two Light Cycles

Light Cycles are virtual and futuristic motorcycles that materialize from thin air, starting with the handlebars. They are neon-colored and move at extreme levels of speed. The arena in which they are used features a white grid on black ground, marking the distance the Light Cycles travel, and only allowing for them to turn at 90 degree angles. Outside of the arena, they can move freely, as real motorcycles do. Starting with Tron: Legacy, light cycle grids no longer have this limitation.

== Development ==
Light Cycles were designed by artist Syd Mead. They were initially rendered digitally. The Light Cycle sequence in Tron was developed by MAGi in Westchester County, New York. It takes place over a length of about three minutes, which is interspersed with one minute of live-action footage.

For Tron: Legacy, the Light Cycle was redesigned by Daniel Simon. Five prop Light Cycles were built in real life, with four of them being destroyed post-production. The final one was purchased by Xiao Yu, a collector based in Nanjing, China; however, he was told by the authorities that it was not street-legal.

== Reception ==
Light Cycles became well known in popular culture, and have been called symbols of futurism and posthumanism. In an analysis, author Esperanza Miyake interpreted the Light Cycles of the original Tron as representations of male power: only men get the chance to ride them, while the sole female character, Yori, does not. Their speed showed male dominance and control over technology, representing the means to "escape".

== Legacy ==
The Light Cycle sequence inspired John Lasseter, who was then working at Disney, to enter computer animation; he went on to direct Toy Story, crediting its creation to Tron.

The Light Cycle design served as the basis for a roller coaster called Tron Lightcycle Power Run, which opened in Shanghai Disneyland in 2016 and Magic Kingdom in 2023, the latter in which it is known as Tron Lightcycle / Run.
