= Tron =

1982 film by Steven Lisberger

- Theatrical release poster
- Directed by: Steven Lisberger
- Screenplay by: Steven Lisberger
- Story by: Steven Lisberger; Bonnie MacBird
- Produced by: Donald Kushner
- Starring: Jeff Bridges; Bruce Boxleitner; David Warner; Cindy Morgan; Barnard Hughes
- Cinematography: Bruce Logan
- Edited by: Jeff Gourson
- Music by: Wendy Carlos
- Production companies: Walt Disney Productions; Lisberger-Kushner Productions
- Distributed by: Buena Vista Distribution
- Release date: July 9, 1982
- Running time: 96 minutes
- Country: United States
- Language: English
- Budget: $17 million
- Box office: $50 million

Tron is a 1982 American science fiction action adventure film written and directed by Steven Lisberger from a story he co-wrote with Bonnie MacBird. The film stars Jeff Bridges as Kevin Flynn, a computer programmer and video game developer who is transported inside the software world of a mainframe computer where he interacts with anthropomorphic programs in his attempt to escape. It also stars Bruce Boxleitner (in the eponymous role), David Warner, Cindy Morgan, and Barnard Hughes. Tron was one of cinema's earliest films to use extensive computer-generated imagery (CGI).

The inspiration for Tron dates back to 1976, when Lisberger became intrigued with video games after seeing Pong. He and producer Donald Kushner set up an animation studio to develop Tron with the intention of making it an animated film. To promote the studio itself, Lisberger and his team created a 30-second animation featuring the first appearance of the title character. Eventually, Lisberger decided to include live-action elements with both backlit and computer animation for the actual feature-length film. Various studios had rejected the storyboards for the film before Walt Disney Productions agreed to finance and distribute Tron. There, backlit animation was finally combined with the 3D computer animation and the live-action footage.

Tron was released by Buena Vista Distribution on July 9, 1982. The film was a moderate success at the box office, and received mixed reviews from critics, who praised its groundbreaking visuals and acting but criticized its storyline as being incoherent. Tron received nominations for Best Costume Design by Elois Jenssen and Rosanna Norton and Best Sound by Michael, Bob, and Lee Minkler and Jim La Rue at the 55th Academy Awards. Tron spawned multiple video games (including an arcade tie-in released shortly after the film) and, as it became a cult film, a multimedia franchise including comic books. A sequel titled Tron: Legacy, directed by Joseph Kosinski, was released in 2010, with Bridges and Boxleitner reprising their roles and Lisberger acting as producer. A commercial success, it was followed by the Disney XD animated series Tron: Uprising in 2012, set between the two films. A third installment, Tron: Ares, was released on October 10, 2025, and also featured the continued involvement of Bridges and Lisberger.

== Plot ==
Leading software engineer Kevin Flynn, formerly employed by technology corporation ENCOM, now runs a video game arcade, where he hacks into ENCOM's system with a program called CLU, hoping to find proof that he is the true author of ENCOM's best-selling videogame, Space Paranoids. However, ENCOM's Master Control Program (MCP) halts his progress and deletes CLU. Within ENCOM, programmer Alan Bradley and his girlfriend, engineer Lora Baines, discover that the MCP has closed off their access to projects. When Alan confronts the senior executive vice president, Ed Dillinger, he asserts the security measures are an effort to stop the hacking attempts. However, when Dillinger privately questions the MCP through his computerized desk, he realizes the MCP has expanded into a powerful virtual intelligence and has been illegally appropriating personal, business, and government programs to increase its own capabilities. As Dillinger rose to the top of ENCOM by presenting Flynn's games as his own, the MCP blackmails Dillinger by threatening to expose his plagiarism should he not comply with its directives.

Lora deduces that Flynn is the hacker, and she and Alan go to his arcade to warn him. Flynn reveals that he has been trying to locate evidence proving Dillinger's guilt. Together, the three form a plan to break into ENCOM and unlock Alan's "Tron" program, a self-governing security measure designed to protect the system and counter the functions of the MCP. Once inside ENCOM, the three split up, and Flynn comes into direct conflict with the MCP through a laboratory terminal. Before Flynn can get the information he needs, the MCP uses an experimental laser to digitize and upload him into the ENCOM gaming grid. There, computer programs are living entities appearing in the likeness of the human "Users" (programmers) who created them. The space is ruled by the MCP and its second-in-command, Sark (an avatar of Dillinger), who coerce programs to renounce their belief in the Users and force those who resist to compete in deadly games.

Flynn is put into the games and plays well; between matches, he befriends two other captured programs, Ram and Tron. The three escape into the system during a round of Light Cycle (an arcade game Flynn created and is skilled at), but Flynn and Ram become separated from Tron by an MCP pursuit party. While attempting to help a badly injured Ram, Flynn learns that he can manipulate portions of the system by accessing his programmer knowledge. Just before Ram "derezzes" (essentially, being erased), he recognizes Flynn as a User, and encourages him to find Tron and free the system. Using his newfound ability, Flynn rebuilds a broken "Recognizer" craft and disguises himself as one of Sark's soldiers.

Tron enlists help from Yori, a sympathetic program and avatar of Lora, and at an I/O tower receives information from Alan necessary to destroy the MCP. Flynn rejoins them, and the three board a hijacked solar sailer to reach the MCP's core. However, Sark's command ship derezzes the sailer, capturing Flynn and Yori and presumably killing Tron. Sark leaves the command ship and orders its deresolution, but Flynn keeps it intact by manipulating the system again.

Sark reaches the MCP's core on a shuttle carrying captured programs deemed powerful or useful. While the MCP attempts to absorb these programs, Tron, who is still alive, confronts Sark and critically injures him, prompting the MCP to give Sark all its functions. Realizing that his ability to manipulate the system might give Tron an opening, Flynn leaps into the beam of the MCP, distracting it. Seeing a break in the MCP's shield, Tron attacks through the gap and destroys the MCP and erases Sark, ending the MCP's control over the system, releasing all lockouts on computer access, and allowing the captured programs to communicate with users again.

Flynn reappears in the real world, rematerialized at the terminal. A printed document proves Dillinger's guilt and Flynn as the original author of Space Paranoids. The next morning, Dillinger enters his office to find the MCP deactivated and his theft exposed. Flynn is subsequently promoted to CEO of ENCOM and is happily greeted by Alan and Lora as their new boss.

== Cast ==
- Jeff Bridges as Kevin Flynn, a former ENCOM programmer and video game developer who runs an arcade following his termination from the company. He is beamed into the mainframe via a digitizing laser by the Master Control Program.
  - Bridges also portrays Clu (Codified Likeness Utility), a hacking program developed by Flynn to find evidence of Dillinger's theft in the mainframe.
- Bruce Boxleitner as Alan Bradley, Flynn's work partner and fellow ENCOM programmer.
  - Boxleitner also portrays Tron, a security program developed by Alan to self-monitor communications between the MCP and the real world.
- David Warner as Ed Dillinger, the senior executive vice president of ENCOM. He was once a coworker of Flynn who used the Master Control Program to steal the latter's work and pass it off as his own, earning himself a series of undeserved promotions.
  - Warner also portrays Sark, a command program developed by Dillinger to serve as the MCP's second-in-command.
  - Warner additionally provided the uncredited voice of the Master Control Program (MCP), a rogue artificial intelligence operating system that originated as a chess program created by Dr. Walter Gibbs but annexed by Dillinger for his own use. The MCP monitors and controls ENCOM's mainframe.
- Cindy Morgan as Dr. Lora Baines, Alan's coworker and girlfriend. She and Gibbs collaborate on ENCOM's digitization experiment.
  - Morgan also portrays Yori, an input/output program developed by Lora.
- Barnard Hughes as Dr. Walter Gibbs, a co-founder of ENCOM who runs the company's science division. He creates the SHV 20905 digitizing laser with Lora's assistance.
  - Hughes also plays Dumont, a guardian program developed by Gibbs to protect input/output junctions in the mainframe.
- Dan Shor as Ram, an actuarial program who is a close ally of Tron and Flynn.
  - Shor also portrays Roy Kleinberg, Ram's User and an ENCOM programmer credited as "Popcorn Co-Worker".
- Peter Jurasik as Crom, a compound interest program matched against Flynn on the Game Grid.
- Tony Stephano as Peter, Dillinger's assistant. Stephano additionally played Sark's Lieutenant.

== Production ==
=== Origins ===
The genesis for Tron originated in 1976, when writer and director Steven Lisberger became fascinated by the emerging world of video games after viewing a sample reel from the computer firm MAGI and encountering Pong for the first time. According to Lisberger, "I realized that there were these techniques that would be very suitable for bringing video games and computer visuals to the screen. And that was the moment that the whole concept flashed across my mind". The film's concept of entering a parallel game world was also inspired by the classic tale Alice in Wonderland.

Lisberger had already created an early version of the character Tron for a thirty-second-long cel animation that was used to promote both Lisberger Studios and a series of various rock radio stations. The character of Tron was portrayed as a glowing yellow figure—the color originally intended to represent all heroic characters before being changed to blue. The prototype Tron was bearded and resembled the Cylon Centurions from the 1978 TV series Battlestar Galactica. Also, Tron was armed with two "exploding discs", as Lisberger described them on the 2-Disc DVD edition (see Rinzler). Lisberger elaborates: "Everybody was doing backlit animation in the 70s, you know. It was that disco look. And we thought, what if we had this character that was a neon line, and that was our Tron warrior – Tron for electronic. And what happened was, I saw Pong, and I said, well, that's the arena for him. And at the same time I was interested in the early phases of computer generated animation, which I got into at MIT in Boston, and when I got into that I met a bunch of programmers who were into all that. And they really inspired me, by how much they believed in this new realm."

He was frustrated by the clique-like nature of computers and video games and wanted to create a film that would open this world up to everyone. Together with producer Donald Kushner, Lisberger moved to the West Coast in 1977 and established an animation studio to develop Tron. They borrowed against the anticipated profits of their 90-minute animated television special Animalympics to develop storyboards for Tron with the notion of envisioning it as a fully animated feature. But after Variety mentioned the project briefly during its early phase, it caught the attention of computer scientist Alan Kay. He contacted Lisberger and convinced him to use him as an adviser on the movie, then persuaded him to use computer-generated imagery instead of just hand-animation.

The film was eventually conceived as an animated film bracketed with live-action sequences. The rest involved a combination of computer-generated visuals and back-lit animation. Lisberger initially sought to finance Tron independently by approaching various computer companies, though most declined to participate. However, one firm, Information International Inc., was receptive. He met with Richard Taylor, a representative, and they began talking about using live-action photography with back-lit animation in such a way that it could be integrated with computer graphics. At this point, there was a script and the film was entirely storyboarded, with some computer-animation tests completed. Lisberger invested approximately $300,000 in the film's development and secured an additional $4–5 million in private funding before progress stalled. Lisberger and Kushner subsequently presented their storyboards and computer animation samples to major studios—including Warner Bros., Metro-Goldwyn-Mayer, and Columbia Pictures—all of which declined to finance the project.

After being rejected by multiple studios, the project was eventually acquired by Walt Disney Productions in 1980. At the time, Disney sought to expand beyond its traditional family-oriented output by developing more ambitious and mature films, as well as creating a film property capable of competing with Star Wars. Tom Wilhite, the studio's vice president for creative development, viewed Lisberger's test footage and persuaded Disney president Ron Miller to support the project. Despite Wilhite's advocacy, studio executives were hesitant to allocate $10–12 million to a first-time producer and director employing largely untested techniques. As a compromise, Disney agreed to fund a test reel depicting a flying disc champion throwing an early prototype of the film's identity discs—an experiment designed to combine live-action footage with backlit animation and computer-generated imagery. Impressed by the results, Disney approved full financing and distribution for Tron.

Bonnie MacBird wrote the first drafts of Tron with extensive input from Lisberger, basing the character of Alan Bradley on Kay. As a result of working together, Kay and MacBird became close and later married. MacBird also developed the characters of Tron and Kevin Flynn, transforming them from conceptual figures into narrative roles. In her initial conception, Flynn was portrayed with a more comedic tone, and she suggested Robin Williams for the role. After Disney acquired the project, the script underwent substantial revisions that shifted the story toward a more serious tone with quasi-religious themes and reduced the emphasis on scientific elements. None of MacBird's original dialogue was retained in the final film, and the changes led to what she later described as a "rather bitter credits dispute." At the time, Disney rarely employed external filmmakers, and Kushner recalled that his team received a cool reception within the studio because they "tackled the nerve center – the animation department. They saw us as the germ from outside. We tried to enlist several Disney animators, but none came. Disney is a closed group." As a result, they hired Wang Film Productions for the animation.

=== Production ===
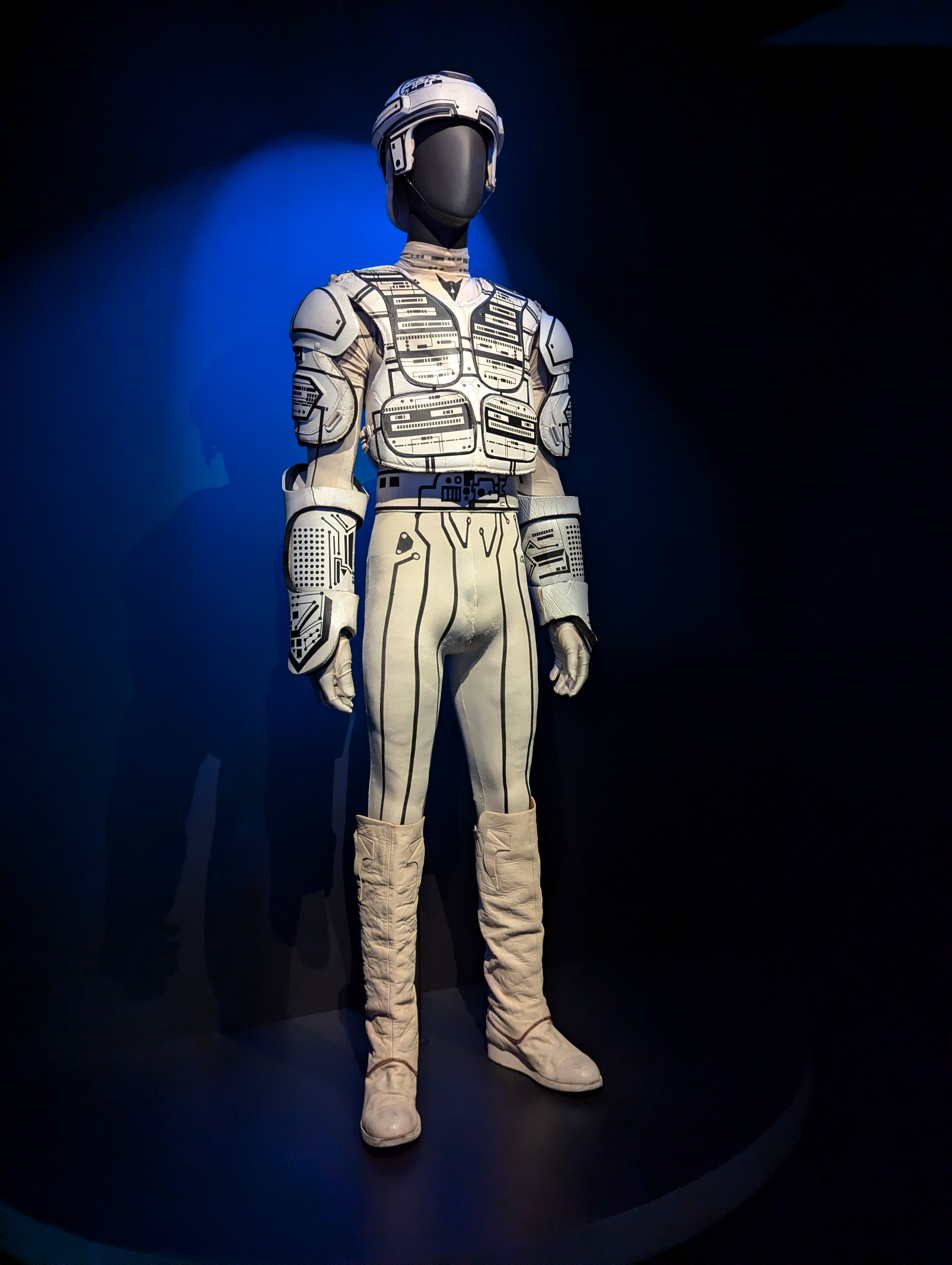
A costume from the film on display at the Academy Museum in Los Angeles, California. Extensive use of computer graphics and animation were used to add the distinctive glowing design to the characters in post-production.

Because of the many special effects, Disney decided in 1981 to film Tron predominantly in the Super Panavision format, with real world scenes filmed in 65mm color and the electronic world scenes in 65mm black-and-white to later be colorized appropriately. Computer-generated and composited layers were shot in VistaVision and few other shots were filmed in anamorphic 35mm and full aperture 35mm, all of which were subsequently "blown up" to 65 mm. The film would be projected on 70mm prints in its original 2.20:1 aspect ratio, while 35mm prints were anamorphically reduced and cropped to a 2.40:1 composition.

Three designers were brought in to create the look of the computer world. French comic book artist Jean Giraud (also known as Mœbius) was the main set and costume designer for the film. Most of the vehicle designs (including Sark's aircraft carrier, the light cycles, the tank, and the solar sailer) were created by industrial designer Syd Mead. Peter Lloyd, a high-tech commercial artist, designed the environments. Nevertheless, these jobs often overlapped, leaving Giraud working on the solar sailer and Mead designing terrain, sets and the film's logo. The original 'Program' character design was inspired by Lisberger Studios' logo of a glowing bodybuilder hurling two discs.

To create the computer animation sequences of Tron, Disney turned to the four leading computer graphics firms of the day: Information International, Inc. of Culver City, California, who owned the Super Foonly F-1 (the fastest PDP-10 ever made and the only one of its kind); MAGI of Elmsford, New York; Robert Abel and Associates of California; and Digital Effects of New York City. Bill Kovacs worked on the film while working for Robert Abel before going on to found Wavefront Technologies. The work was not a collaboration, resulting in very different styles used by the firms.

Tron was one of the first films to make extensive use of any form of computer animation, and it is celebrated as a milestone in the industry, although only fifteen to twenty minutes of such animation were used (mostly scenes that show digital "terrain" or patterns, or include vehicles such as light-cycles, tanks and ships). Because the technology to combine computer animation and live action did not exist at the time, these sequences were interspersed with the filmed characters. One of the computers used had only 2 MB of memory and no more than 330 MB of storage. This put a limit on detail of background; and at a certain distance, they had a procedure of mixing in black to fade things out, a process called "depth cueing". The film's Computer Effects Supervisor Richard Taylor told them "When in doubt, black it out!", which became their motto. Originally the film was meant to use white backgrounds like in THX 1138 inside the Grid, but it would require such huge amounts of lights that it was decided to use black backgrounds instead.

The computers used at the time could not perform animation, so the frames had to be produced one by one. In some of the more complex sequences, like the Solar Sailer moving through metal canyons, each frame could take up to six hours to produce. There was no way to digitally print them on film, either; rather, a motion picture camera was placed in front of a computer screen to capture each individual frame.

Most of the scenes, backgrounds, and visual effects in the film were created using more traditional techniques and a unique process known as "backlit animation". In this process, live-action scenes inside the computer world were filmed in black-and-white on an entirely black set, placed in an enlarger for blow-ups and transferred to large format Kodalith high-contrast film. These negatives were then used to make Kodalith sheets with a reverse (positive) image. Clear cels were laid over each sheet and all portions of the figure except the areas that were exposed for the later camera passes were manually blacked out. Next the Kodalith sheets and cel overlays were placed over a light box while a VistaVision camera mounted above it made separate passes and different color filters. A typical shot normally required 12 passes, but some sequences, like the interior of the electronic tank, could need as many as 50 passes. About 300 matte paintings were made for the film, each photographed onto a large piece of Ektachrome film before colors were added by gelatin filters in a similar procedure as in the Kodaliths. The mattes, rotoscopic and CGI were then combined and composed together to give them a "technological" appearance. With multiple layers of high-contrast, large format positives and negatives, this process required truckloads of sheet film and a workload even greater than that of a conventional cel-animated feature. The Kodalith was specially produced as large sheets by Kodak for the film and came in numbered boxes so that each batch of the film could be used in order of manufacture for a consistent image. However, this was not understood by the filmmakers and, as a result, glowing outlines and circuit traces occasionally flicker as the film speed varied between batches. After the reason was discovered, this was no longer a problem as the batches were used in order and "zinger" sounds were used during the flickering parts to represent the computer world malfunctioning as Lisberger described it. Lisberger later had these flickers and sounds digitally corrected for the 2011 restored Blu-ray release as they were not included in his original vision of the film. Due to its difficulty and cost, this process of back-lit animation was not repeated for another feature film.

Sound design and creation for the film was assigned to Frank Serafine, who was responsible for the sound design on Star Trek: The Motion Picture in 1979. "There were over 750 units [separate tape segments] in the picture," said Serafine. He created all the sound effects in the movie exclusively by synthesizers and similar electronic devices.

At one point in the film, a small entity called "Bit" advises Flynn with only the words "yes" and "no" created by a Votrax speech synthesizer.

BYTE wrote: "Although this film is very much the personal expression of Steven Lisberger's vision, nevertheless [it] has certainly been a group effort". More than 569 people were involved in the post-production work, including 200 inkers and hand-painters, 85 of them from Taiwan's Cuckoo's Nest Studio. Unusual for an English-language production, in the end credits the Taiwanese personnel were listed with their names written in Chinese characters.

This film features parts of the Lawrence Livermore National Laboratory; the multi-story ENCOM laser bay was the target area for the SHIVA solid-state multi-beamed laser. Also, the stairway that Alan, Lora, and Flynn use to reach Alan's office is the stairway in Building 451 near the entrance to the main machine room. The cubicle scenes were shot in another room of the lab. At the time, Tron was the only film to have scenes filmed inside this lab.

The original script called for "good" programs to be colored yellow and "evil" programs (those loyal to Sark and the MCP) to be colored blue. Partway into production, this coloring scheme was changed to blue for good and red for evil, but some scenes were produced using the original coloring scheme: Clu, who drives a tank, has yellow circuit lines, and all of Sark's tank commanders are blue (but appear green in some presentations). Also, the light-cycle sequence shows the heroes driving yellow (Flynn), orange (Tron), and red (Ram) cycles, while Sark's troops drive blue cycles; similarly, Clu's tank is red, while tanks driven by crews loyal to Sark are blue.

Because of all the personal information about citizens which exist inside computer networks, such as social security number and driver's license, the idea was that each real world person has a digital counterpart inside the Grid based on information about them, which is why it was decided to use some of the same actors in both worlds.

Budgeting the production was difficult by reason of breaking new ground in response to additional challenges, including an impending Directors Guild of America strike and a fixed release date. Disney predicted at least $400 million in domestic sales of merchandise, including an arcade game by Bally Midway and three Mattel Intellivision home video games.

The producers also added Easter eggs: during the scene where Tron and Ram escape from the Light Cycle arena into the system, Pac-Man can be seen behind Sark (with the corresponding sounds from the Pac-Man arcade game being heard in the background), while a "Hidden Mickey" outline (located at time 01:12:29 on the re-release Blu-ray) can be seen below the solar sailer during the protagonists' journey. The film set also included the arcade games Space Invaders (1978), Asteroids (1979) and Pac-Man (1980).

Tron was originally meant to be released during the Christmas season of 1982, but when chairman of the Disney board Card Walker found out the release date of Don Bluth's film The Secret of NIMH was in early July, he rushed it into a summer release to be able to compete with Bluth, and it ended up competing with films like E.T. the Extra-Terrestrial, Star Trek II: The Wrath of Khan, Blade Runner and Poltergeist.

== Soundtrack ==
The soundtrack for Tron was written by pioneer electronic musician Wendy Carlos, who is best known for her album Switched-On Bach and for the soundtracks to many films, including the Stanley Kubrick-directed films A Clockwork Orange and The Shining. The music, which was the first collaboration between Carlos and her partner Annemarie Franklin, featured a mix of an analog Moog synthesizer and Crumar's GDS digital synthesizer (complex additive and phase modulation synthesis), along with non-electronic pieces performed by the London Philharmonic Orchestra (hired at the insistence of Disney, which was concerned that Carlos might not be able to complete her score on time). Two additional musical tracks ("1990's Theme" and "Only Solutions") were provided by the American band Journey after British band Supertramp pulled out of the project. An album featuring dialogue, music and sound effects from the film was also released on LP by Disneyland Records in 1982.

== Reception and legacy ==
=== Box office ===
Tron was released on July 9, 1982, in 1,091 theaters in the United States and Canada grossing US$4 million on its opening weekend. It went on to gross $33 million in the United States and Canada and $17 million overseas, for a worldwide gross of approximately $50 million, which was Disney's highest-grossing live action film for 5 years.

In addition, the film had $70 million in wholesale merchandise sales.

Despite the gross and merchandise sales, it was seen as a financial disappointment, and the studio wrote off some of its $17 million budget.

=== Critical response ===
The film was met with mixed reviews by critics. Roger Ebert of the Chicago Sun-Times gave the film four out of four stars and described it as "a dazzling movie from Disney in which computers have been used to make themselves romantic and glamorous. Here's a technological sound-and-light show that is sensational and brainy, stylish and fun". However, near the end of his review, he noted (in a positive tone), "This is an almost wholly technological movie. Although it's populated by actors who are engaging (Bridges, Cindy Morgan) or sinister (Warner), it's not really a movie about human nature. Like Star Wars or The Empire Strikes Back but much more so, this movie is a machine to dazzle and delight us". Ebert closed his first annual Overlooked Film Festival with a showing of Tron. Gene Siskel of the Chicago Tribune also awarded four out of four stars, calling it "a trip, and a terrifically entertaining one at that...It's a dazzler that opens up our minds to our new tools, all in a traditional film narrative." Each gave the film "two thumbs up". Tron was also featured in Siskel and Ebert's video pick of the week in 1993.

InfoWorld's Deborah Wise was impressed, writing that "it's hard to believe the characters acted out the scenes on a darkened soundstage.... We see characters throwing illuminated Frisbees, driving 'lightcycles' on a video-game grid, playing a dangerous version of jai alai and zapping numerous fluorescent tanks in arcade-game-type mazes. It's exciting, it's fun, and it's just what video-game fans and anyone with a spirit of adventure will love—despite plot weaknesses."

On the other hand, Variety disliked the film and said in its review, "Tron is loaded with visual delights but falls way short of the mark in story and viewer involvement. Screenwriter-director Steven Lisberger has adequately marshalled a huge force of technicians to deliver the dazzle, but even kids (and specifically computer game geeks) will have a difficult time getting hooked on the situations". In her review for The New York Times, Janet Maslin criticized the film's visual effects: "They're loud, bright and empty, and they're all this movie has to offer". The Washington Post's Gary Arnold wrote, "Fascinating as they are as discrete sequences, the computer-animated episodes don't build dramatically. They remain a miscellaneous form of abstract spectacle". In his review for The Globe and Mail, Jay Scott wrote, "It's got momentum and it's got marvels, but it's without heart; it's a visionary technological achievement without vision".

Colin Greenland reviewed the home video release of Tron for Imagine magazine, and stated that "three plucky young programmers descend into the micro-world to battle the Master Control Program with a sacred frisbee. Loses much of its excitement on the little screen."

On review aggregation website Rotten Tomatoes, the film holds a 61% rating based on the reviews of 163 critics. The website's consensus states: "While not as dramatically strong as it is technologically, TRON is a visually stunning piece of science fiction that represents a landmark work in the history of computer animation." Metacritic gave the film a score of 58 based on 13 reviews, indicating "mixed or average reviews". Audiences polled by CinemaScore gave the film an average grade of "B+" on an A+ to F scale.

Despite the film being widely noted as having groundbreaking visual effects, it did not receive an Academy Award nomination for Best Visual Effects. Director Steven Lisberger speculated that voting members believed the production "cheated by using computers". The film did, however, earn Oscar nominations in the categories of Best Costume Design (Elois Jenssen and Rosanna Norton) and Best Sound (Michael Minkler, Bob Minkler, Lee Minkler, and James LaRue).

=== Cultural effect ===
The success of Tron led several of the film's computer animators, including lead animator Chris Wedge, to create a new animation studio, Blue Sky Studios, in 1987 after their previous studio shut down.

In 1997, Ken Perlin of the Mathematical Applications Group, Inc. won an Academy Award for Technical Achievement for his invention of Perlin noise for Tron.

The film, considered groundbreaking, has inspired many people in various ways. John Lasseter, head of Pixar and Disney's animation group, described how the film helped him see the potential of computer-generated imagery in the production of animated films, stating, "without Tron, there would be no Toy Story."

The two members of the French house music group Daft Punk, who scored the sequel and also had cameo appearances in it, have shared a lifelong fascination with the film.

Tron developed into a cult film and was ranked as 13th in a 2010 list of the top 20 cult films published by The Boston Globe.

The film heavily inspired the music video for Danish pop/dance group Infernal's 2006 hit single "From Paris to Berlin". The music video for Australian rock band Regurgitator's 1997 song "Everyday Formula" was also heavily inspired by the film and recreates several scenes.

In 2008, the American Film Institute nominated this film for its Top 10 Science Fiction Films list.

== Books ==
A novelization of Tron was released in 1982, written by American science fiction novelist Brian Daley. It included eight pages of color photographs from the movie. In the same year, Disney Senior Staff Publicist Michael Bonifer authored a book entitled The Art of Tron which covered aspects of the pre-production and post-production aspects of Tron. A nonfiction book about the making of the original film, The Making of Tron: How Tron Changed Visual Effects and Disney Forever, was written by William Kallay and published in 2011.

== Other media ==
=== Television ===
Tron made its television debut as part of the Disney Channel's first day of programming, on April 18, 1983, at 7:00PM (ET).

=== Home media ===
Tron was originally released on VHS, Betamax, LaserDisc, and CED Videodisc on December 1, 1982. As with most video releases from the 1980s, the film was cropped to the 4:3 pan and scan format. The film saw multiple re-releases throughout the 1990s, most notably an "Archive Collection" LaserDisc box set, which featured the first release of the film in its original widescreen 2.20:1 format. By 1991, Tron had grossed $17 million in video rentals.

Tron saw its first DVD release on May 19, 1998. This bare-bones release utilized the same non-anamorphic video transfer used in the Archive Collection LaserDisc set, and it did not include any of the LD's special features. On January 15, 2002, the film received a 20th Anniversary Collector's Edition release in the forms of a VHS and a special 2-Disc DVD set. This set featured a new THX-mastered anamorphic video transfer and included all of the special features from the LD Archive Collection release, plus an all-new 90 minute "Making of Tron" documentary.

To tie in with the home video release of Tron: Legacy, the movie was finally re-released by Walt Disney Studios Home Entertainment on Special Edition DVD and for the first time on Blu-ray Disc on April 5, 2011, with the subtitle "The Original Classic" to distinguish it from its sequel. Tron was also featured in a 5-Disc Blu-ray Combo with the 3D copy of Tron: Legacy. The film was re-released on Blu-ray and DVD in the UK on June 27, 2011.

The film was released in 4K Ultra HD Steelbook on September 16, 2025. The original 65mm film negative was scanned in 8K and remastered in Dolby Vision and Atmos. The restoration efforts were completed by the Walt Disney Studios Restoration team, which corrected the new digital master for dirt, warping and other source imperfections under the supervision of Lisberger.

=== Theme parks ===
In Disneyland, the PeopleMover attraction was updated in 1982 to include Tron film projections in the SuperSpeed Tunnel section of the ride, which was announced as the Game Grid of Tron by the on-board audio guide. After this addition, the attraction was advertised as the PeopleMover Thru the World of Tron.

In 2016, Shanghai Disneyland opened Tron Lightcycle Power Run, a semi-enclosed, launched roller coaster based on the original film and its sequel. Walt Disney World opened a nearly identical version in 2023, called TRON Lightcycle / Run. Both are in the Tomorrowland-themed areas at each park.

== Franchise ==
=== Sequels ===
On January 12, 2005, Disney announced it had hired screenwriters Brian Klugman and Lee Sternthal to write a sequel to Tron. In 2008, director Joseph Kosinski negotiated to develop and direct TRON, described as "the next chapter" of the 1982 film and based on a preliminary teaser trailer shown at that year's San Diego Comic-Con, with Lisberger co-producing. Filming began in Vancouver, British Columbia in April 2009. During the 2009 Comic-Con, the title of the sequel was revealed to be changed to Tron: Legacy. The second trailer (also with the Tron: Legacy logo) was released in 3D with Alice In Wonderland. A third trailer premiered at Comic-Con 2010 on July 22. At Disney's D23 Expo on September 10–13, 2009, they also debuted teaser trailers for Tron: Legacy as well as having a light cycle and other props from the film there. The film was released on December 17, 2010, with Daft Punk composing the score.

In October 2010, a third film was announced to be in development, with Kosinski returning as director with a script co-written by Adam Horowitz and Edward Kitsis. The concept and ideas for a third film continued behind the scenes, from August 2016 to March 2017, when Jared Leto was announced to have signed on to co-star as a new character named Ares. In March 2022, Leto confirmed that the film was still in development. By January 2023, Garth Davis had exited as director, with Joachim Rønning entering negotiations to replace him; while production was planned to begin in Vancouver by August 2023. Initially scheduled to begin on August 14, 2023, principal photography was delayed due to the 2023 Hollywood labor disputes. In June 2023, Evan Peters was set to join the cast. Following the conclusion of the strikes in early November 2023, filming was reportedly set to begin early 2024. In late November 2023 however, it was announced that production on the project would officially begin following the holiday season of the same year. The film was released on October 10, 2025.

=== Television series ===
Tron: Uprising is a 2012 animated series set between the events of the first two films. In the series, young program Beck becomes the leader of a revolution inside the computer world of the Grid, tasked with the mission of freeing his home and friends from the reign of Clu and his henchman, General Tesler. To prepare for the challenge, Beck is mentored by Tron – the greatest warrior The Grid has ever known – as he grows beyond his youthful nature into a courageous and powerful leader. Destined to become the system's new protector, Beck adopts Tron's persona to battle the forces of evil.

== See also ==
- Tron (hacker)
- Demoscene
- Isekai
- Golden age of arcade video games
- Automan, a 1983 ABC television series inspired by the film
- Superhuman Samurai Syber-Squad
- Digimon Adventure
- Code Lyoko
- Zixx
- ReBoot
