= Dconstructed =

2014 remix compilation album by Walt Disney Records

Remix album by Various artists
- Released: April 22, 2014
- Recorded: 2010–2014
- Genre: Electronic
- Length: 66:04
- Label: Walt Disney
- Producer: Mitchell Leib; Dani Markman

Dconstructed (stylized as DCONSTRUCTED) is a remix album released by Walt Disney Records on April 22, 2014.

== Background ==
The album features remixes of select songs from various Disney films, animated shorts, television series, and theme park attractions by various contemporary electronic musicians.

The album includes Avicii's remix of Daft Punk's "Derezzed", which previously appeared in Tron: Legacy Reconfigured, though this version is rearranged and features new vocals. On the week of May 10, 2014, the remix album entered and peaked at position number 7 on the Billboard Dance/Electronic Albums chart.

== Track listing ==
No.	Title	Writer(s)	Remixer(s)	Length
1.	"Circle of Life" (The Lion King)	Elton John, Tim Rice	Mat Zo	5:01
2.	"Derezzed" (Tron: Legacy)	Daft Punk	Avicii (featuring Negin)	5:03
3.	"Let It Go" (Frozen)	Kristen Anderson-Lopez, Robert Lopez	Armin Van Buuren	6:19
4.	"Roar" (Monsters University)	Axwell and Sebastian Ingrosso	Yogi	4:19
5.	"Partysaurus Overflow" (Partysaurus Rex)	Brian Transeau	BT and Au5	5:34
6.	"UNKLE Reconstruction" (The Incredibles)	Michael Giacchino	U.N.K.L.E.	6:02
7.	"Fall" (Tron: Legacy)	Daft Punk	The Japanese Popstars	3:55
8.	"The Muppet Show Theme" (The Muppets)	Jim Henson, Sam Pottle	Shy Kidx	3:42
9.	"Hey Pluto!" (Mickey Mouse)	Paul Smith	StoneBridge	5:34
10.	"Once Upon a Dream" (Sleeping Beauty)	Sammy Fain, Jack Lawrence	TRiON	4:20
11.	"Main Street Electrical Parade" (Disneyland Park)	Jean-Jacques Perrey, Gershon Kingsley, Jean-Marcel Leroy	Shinichi Osawa	5:49
12.	"You've Got a Friend in Me" (Toy Story)	Randy Newman	Alfred Montejano	2:53
13.	"Baby Mine" (Dumbo)	Frank Churchill, Ned Washington	Kaskade	3:08
14.	"Pineapple Princess" (Hawaiiannette)	Robert B. Sherman, Richard M. Sherman	Kinsey Moore	4:05
Total length:				66:04

== Charts ==
Chart (2014)	Peak position
US Dance/Electronic Albums (Billboard)	7
US Kid Albums (Billboard)	4
