= Ki Theory =

American musician and producer

Ki:Theory
- Born: Joel Burleson
- Origin: Richmond, Virginia, US
- Genres: Indie rock, electronica
- Years active: 1999–present
- Labels: Kringer Records
- Website: kitheory.com

Joel Burleson, better known as Ki:Theory (pronounced "key theory") is an American recording artist and producer who specializes in alternative rock with electronic elements. As of 2026, he has released four studio albums, three soundtracks, a remix album, one compilation, and eight EPs, as well as numerous singles.

== Career ==
Ki:Theory's first release, a self-titled, full-length album, came out in 2000. It was followed by The Mantic Method, in 2003. The artist subsequently issued several EPs, including Brittle Branches (2006), Save Our City (2008), Arms for Legs (2009), Remixes 1 (2010), Remixes 2 (2010), and Messages: Syntax / Error (2011). On November 30, 2011, the project released the single "I Wanna Run", featuring Maura Davis, who was previously part of Denali.

Ki:Theory's third full-length album, KITTY HAWK, was published on October 29, 2013. The title track is featured in the trailer for the video game FIFA 14 as well as in The Crew.

On February 3, 2014, Ki:Theory's cover of Ben E. King's "Stand by Me", off the KITTY HAWK album, was used in Fox's The Following in episode 3 of season 2 as well as the 2014 Super Bowl TV spot, also for The Following. The song has since been used in a trailer for the film Brick Mansions and the CW network TV series Star-Crossed, as well as TV spots for Bates Motel, Dallas, and the Netflix production Marco Polo. On July 9, 2017, the track was played at the end of the season-3 mid-season finale of Fear the Walking Dead. A "Remixed and Extended" edition of KITTY HAWK came out in April 2014. It features previously unreleased songs as well as remixes by artists such as Odesza, Fink, and UNKLE.

In June 2015, Ki:Theory issued the single "If You Don't Care" / "Fake It", alongside a remix by electronic producer GANZ, featuring sped-up vocals from the original song.

In November 2016, the project contributed to the promotion of the upcoming 2017 live-action Ghost in the Shell film adaptation, with a cover/remix of Depeche Mode's "Enjoy the Silence", taken from the EP Walkin' After Midnight.

On his fourth studio album, Silence, issued in 2017, Ki:Theory collaborated with electro-pop singer Ruelle on the track "Bringing Me Down". In 2019, he released the EP Centrifugal.

== Remix and soundtrack work ==
Ki:Theory's remix of Daft Punk's "The Son of Flynn", from their 2010 soundtrack to the film Tron: Legacy, was included on the subsequent remix album, Tron: Legacy Reconfigured. His remix of Rodrigo Y Gabriela's "Angelica" was included on the 2011 soundtrack to Pirates of the Caribbean: On Stranger Tides.

His music has been featured on various television programs, including Top Gear, CSI: Crime Scene Investigation, and MTV's Teen Mom 2, among others.

His songs have appeared in commercials for Converse, Billabong, Gap, and Audi; the video game trailer for FIFA 14; and within the games Need for Speed: Shift, The Crew, Counter-Strike: Global Offensive, and The Sims 4.

Ki:Theory has released three full film scores to date: Killer Shots (Soundtrack) (2011), Long Live Chainsaw (Original Motion Picture Soundtrack) (2021), and The Engine Inside (Original Score) (2023).

== Discography ==
Studio albums

- Ki:Theory (2000)
- The Mantic Method (2003)
- KITTY HAWK (2013)
- KITTY HAWK (Remixed and Extended) (2014)
- Silence (2017)
- HMNS (2025)

Soundtracks

- Killer Shots (Soundtrack) (2011)
- Long Live Chainsaw (Original Motion Picture Soundtrack) (2021)
- The Engine Inside (Original Score) (2023)

EP

- Brittle Branches (2006)
- Save Our City (2008)
- Arms for Legs (2009)
- Remixes 1 (2010)
- Remixes 2 (2010)
- Messages: Syntax / Error (2011)
- Walkin' After Midnight (2016)
- Centrifugal (2019)

Compilations

- Relics (2021)

Singles

- "I Wanna Run (feat. Maura Davis)" (2011)
- "Holiday Heart" (2011)
- "HowVeryDare" (2011)
- "Kitty Hawk" (2013)
- "If You Don't Care / Fake It" (2015)
- "Terraform" (2015)
- "Walkin' After Midnight / Enjoy the Silence" (November 11, 2016)
- "Stand by Me (Remixes)" (2017)
- "Bringing Me Down (feat. Ruelle)" (March 29, 2017)
- "Evolve" (with Honor of Kings) (2020)
- "The Prisoner's Song" (with Roniit
- "Hunting We Will Go" (2023)
- "Run This Game" (with Night Panda) (2023)

Remixes

- Daft Punk – “The Son of Flynn” (2011), Tron: Legacy Reconfigured (2011)
- Rodrigo y Gabriela with Hans Zimmer – “Angelica (Grant Us Peace Remix)”, Pirates of the Caribbean: On Stranger Tides (2011)
