= Tron: Legacy (pinball) =

2011 pinball machine

- flyer for 2011 version
- Manufacturer: Stern Pinball
- Release date: May 2011
- System: SAM
- Design: John Borg
- Programming: Lyman Sheats
- Artwork: John Youssi
- Music: David Thiel
- Sound: David Thiel
- Animation: Mark Galvez

Tron: Legacy is a pinball machine designed by John Borg and released by Stern Pinball in May 2011. It is based on the film of the same name, licensed from Disney Consumer Products.

== Overview ==
The 25 years on the flyer for the 2011 version of this machine refers to the formation of Data East's pinball division which was formed in 1986 and eventually became Stern Pinball.

The game features audio clips from the film's main characters. The voice of the Grid was recorded by Carol Thiel; with David Thiel providing the sentry voices.

Three Daft Punk music tracks from the film are used. "Tron Legacy (End Titles)" is used as the main music for the game. "C.L.U." is used in a mode, and "Derezzed" is used in Quorra multiball. The remainder of the music is written by David Thiel.

One of these machines was available for play at Starcade in Disneyland before the closure of that attraction in 2015. Another was used in a recreation of Flynn's arcade for a press event for the launch of Tron Lightcycle at Walt Disney World in 2023.

== Design ==
Four versions of Tron: Legacy were produced. The primary colours from the film, yellow and blue, feature prominently through all the artwork. The first standard version features a black legs and trim, 3D translite, and screen cabinet art. At the same time a limited edition was produced with the same artwork but illuminated backglass. The artwork for this backglass is licensed rather than produced by Stern under license, and is also used on the blu-ray release of the film. For all versions the sides of the cabinet each have two light cycle racers, with yellow in the lead on the right side, and blue in the lead on the left side. Gem and Quorra are shown on either side of the backbox. The left slingshot in the game shows CLU as the yellow rider, and the right slingshot shows the Sam Flynn as the blue rider.

The 3rd version was released in 2012 with cabinet decals, and the "CLU" version of the translite showing five main characters. The 4th version was released in 2013 with cabinet decals, and a different version of the translite featuring Quorra and Gem; the CLU translite was also included, but not installed. All versions other than the standard 2011 version can have a shaker motor fitted, but none had it installed from the factory.

The limited edition was restricted to 400 units. These have bright chrome legs and trim, and addition of silver paint into the playfield. Optical fibre light tubes are used along the ramps and wireforms; these use LEDs which change colour as the different game modes are played. They were also signed and came with a numbered plaque.

== Layout ==
Playfield with LEDs in red state

The game uses a manual plunger. It is a 3 flipper game, with the upper flipper located on the left side of the playfield; these flippers are all yellow with black rubber. On the left of the playfield are T-R-O-N standup targets; 4 further stand-up targets (Z-U-S-E) are scattered across the game. There are two ramps, one accessible from the upper flipper is the "yellow ramp", and the left ramp is the "blue ramp"; each of these have a diecast light cycle (replaced with cars on the 4th edition) above them. The game has two spinners, the Quorra spinner in the left loop, and the Zuse spinner located in the right orbit. The central feature of the game is the recognizer bank of 3 targets which can drop down to reveal a Recognizer ship above a spinning disc. Three pop bumpers are halfway up the machine on the right; the path to the right orbit is between these bumpers. Lower down on the right is Flynn's arcade scoop that is open on three sides allowing access from multiple shots. On top of this is a model of Tron video game cabinet.

On the limited edition is a rotating "Recognizer" vehicle not on any other version of the game; this is located above the central bank of 3 stand-up targets. Instead of the stand-up targets on the left of standard editions there are 4 drop-targets.

=== Tron cabinet mod ===
The Stern produced in-game Tron cabinet only bore a passing resemblance to the 1982 cabinet, but a third-party mod could be made or bought to replace it which not only uses the same cabinet design and art as the original but has a working screen displaying the attract mode from the video game. Additionally it uses UV light which can make the controller glow. The software and design were made freely available.

== Gameplay ==
upper part of playfield with lightcycle, LEDs in blue state

The player is in the role of Sam Flynn. It begins with an attempt at one of three skillshots. Towards the bottom of the playfield is a ladder of 10 inserts. The first 9 can be lit by winning various modes, or made to flash by playing but not winning them. These include the 3 multiball modes: light cycle multiball, Quorra multiball, and disc multiball. These 9 modes are all based on scenes from the film. After these 9 inserts are flashing "Sea of simulation" can be played which is a single ball mode where shots need to be made to light the modes the player failed to light solid. After they are all solidly lit the wizard mode, Portal, can be played. This is a 4 ball multiball where 21 shots need to be hit to enable the super jackpot which represents the player escaping the Grid through the Portal.

End of Line multiball is only available on the limited edition. This is different to End of the line jackpots which are scored from combos and then hitting the scoop despite the display and callouts often not indicating to aim for this.

A tournament button could be fitted, but was not factory installed on all games. For games played using this random "mystery awards" are made to be fixed instead of random.

The 42K points awarded when starting the Zen mode may be referring to 42 Entertainment who produced the ARG for Tron: Legacy.

== Reception ==
Pinball News in a very extensive review gave the game a rating of 81%, with detailed scores for seven elements:

- Layout 8.5/10. The upper flipper was welcomed, as was the good variety of shots in the game.
- Art 8.5/10. The artwork was highly praised noting the "visually striking Tron environment" is well suited for various aspects of a pinball machine. The integration of new elements on the playfield using the Tron style guide was also praised with strong use of the colours blue and yellow.
- Sounds & Music 9.5/10. All of the music was praised, with the original tracks blending well with those from Daft Punk summing it up as "one of the best games musically of recent times". Despite the actor call-outs being taken solely from the film, Michael Sheen was praised.
- Lights 7/10. While most of the playfield was adequately lit, there were a few more dimly lit areas; the lamps in the Tron video game cabinet were criticized, and recommended home owners to use a replacement.
- Dots (DMD display) 6.5/10. This was the most criticized aspect, noting that while some modes included plenty of images, too often the display was just plain text messages.
- Rules 7/10. The game was praised for being more accessible to players by having an additional way to reach the wizard mode with "Sea of simulation", and enjoyed that features can be stacked (played at the same time). There was slight criticism that in the version of the game code being used there was no information on the display about choice of skill shot, or for light cycle multiball; but hoped this would be rectified in a future update.

In the guide to the game for Kineticist, it was thought to be the best game Stern released in the late 2000s/early 2010s.

== See also ==
- List of Stern Pinball machines
