= Tron: Legacy Reconfigured =

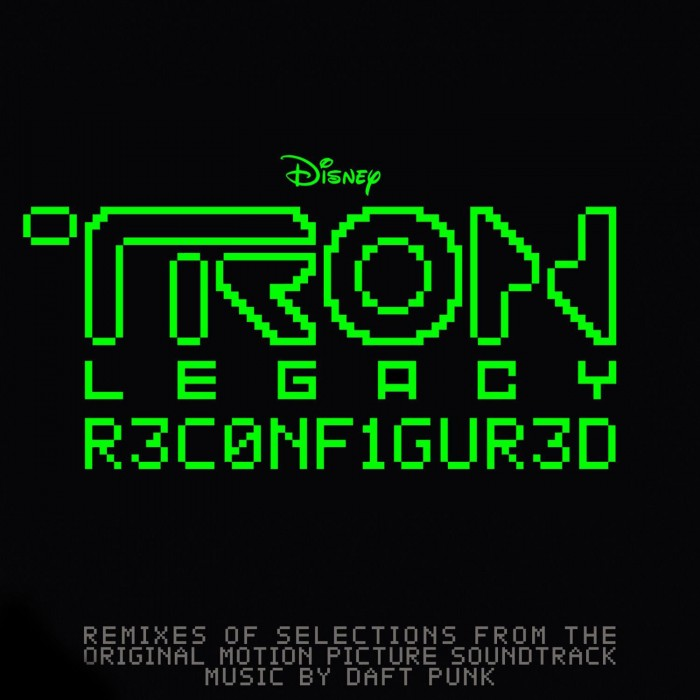

Remix album by Daft Punk
- Released: April 5, 2011
- Genres: House; electro house
- Length: 77:43
- Label: Walt Disney
- Producers: Thomas Bangalter; Jason Bentley; Guy-Manuel de Homem-Christo; Mitchell Leib

Daft Punk chronology
Tron: Legacy (2010)	Tron: Legacy Reconfigured (2011)	Random Access Memories (2013)

Tron: Legacy Reconfigured (Note: Stylised on the cover art as TRON: LEGACY R3C0NF1GUR3D) is a remix album of music by Daft Punk, released by Walt Disney Records on April 5, 2011. The album features remixes of selections from the Tron: Legacy film score by various contemporary electronic musicians. Tron: Legacy Reconfigured charted in several countries and peaked at number one in the Billboard Dance/Electronic chart. The album was released to mixed reviews.

== Background ==
Tron: Legacy Reconfigured was released to coincide with the home video release of Tron: Legacy. The remix album was sold as either a standalone record or as part of box sets including the film, an EP of bonus tracks from the original score, a copy of the comic book miniseries tie-in Tron: Betrayal, and a poster of Daft Punk as they appear in the film. The "ultimate" box order included a five-disc set featuring Tron: The Original Classic as well as a collectible lithograph.

Daft Punk's former manager Pedro Winter was displeased with Tron: Legacy Reconfigured and asserted that the duo was not involved with the remix album. He wrote in an open letter to Disney that, "Of course some of it is nice, and you know there are some of my friends on this CD. But this is not enough! [...] I am sad to discover the A&R at Disney records is apparently buying most of his electronic music in airports stores..."

== Critical reception ==
Professional ratings
Aggregate scores
Source	Rating
AnyDecentMusic?	7.0/10
Metacritic	59/100
Review scores
Source	Rating
AllMusic	3.5/5 stars
Consequence of Sound	4/5 stars
IGN	8/10
Los Angeles Times	2/4 stars
Pitchfork	5/10
PopMatters	4/10
Sputnikmusic	3.5/5

Reception to the remix album was generally mixed. On Metacritic, the album holds an aggregate score of 59/100, indicating "mixed or average reviews". Heather Phares of AllMusic believed that Tron: Legacy Reconfigured was made in response to the perceived lack of "dancefloor movers" in the original score and noted that, "While the acts involved don't offer many surprises, they do what they do well". A Consequence of Sound review also felt that the record was a more accessible version of the film soundtrack: "Listening to the album straight through feels more like an eclectic concert than a compilation, and that’s meant as a compliment."

Jess Harvell of Pitchfork wrote that the album is successful "about 50% of the time" with the conclusion that, "taken as a whole, what we're left with is a solidly middle-of-the-road project building off a solidly middle-of-the-road movie score. In a negative review, PopMatters believed that Tron: Legacy Reconfigured was a "cash-in release" based on the "disappointing" original soundtrack. "The remixes that depart sharply from the originals, and sound more like their creators than like Daft Punk, often sound the best."

The Photek remix of "End of Line" was nominated for Best Remixed Recording, Non-Classical at the 54th Grammy Awards in 2011. The Glitch Mob's remix of "Derezzed" is used in various promos and trailers for the film's animated prequel, Tron: Uprising.

== Track listing ==
All music is composed by Daft Punk.

Standard edition
No.	Title	Remixer(s)	Length
1.	"Derezzed"	The Glitch Mob	4:22
2.	"Fall"	M83 vs. Big Black Delta	3:54
3.	"The Grid"	The Crystal Method	4:27
4.	"Adagio for Tron"	Teddybears	5:34
5.	"The Son of Flynn"	Ki:Theory	4:51
6.	"C.L.U."	Paul Oakenfold	4:35
7.	"The Son of Flynn"	Moby	6:32
8.	"End of Line [Boys Noize Remix]"	Boys Noize	5:40
9.	"Rinzler"	Kaskade	6:52
10.	"ENCOM, Part II"	Com Truise	4:52
11.	"End of Line"	Photek	5:18
12.	"Arena"	The Japanese Popstars	6:07
13.	"Derezzed"	Avicii	5:03
14.	"Solar Sailer"	Pretty Lights	4:32
15.	"Tron Legacy (End Titles)"	Sander Kleinenberg	5:04
Total length:			77:43

Australian edition
No.	Title	Remixer(s)	Length
11.	"End of Line"	Tame Impala	5:18
Total length:			77:43

== Charts ==
=== Weekly charts ===
Weekly chart performance for Tron: Legacy Reconfigured
Chart (2011)	Peak position
Australian Albums (ARIA)	65
Belgian Albums (Ultratop Flanders)	91
Belgian Albums (Ultratop Wallonia)	100
Canadian Albums (Billboard)	24
Scottish Albums (Official Charts)	83
Swedish Albums (Sverigetopplistan)	41
UK Albums (Official Charts)	59
US Billboard 200	16
US Top Dance Albums (Billboard)	1

=== Year-end charts ===
Year-end chart performance for Tron: Legacy Reconfigured
Chart (2011)	Position
US Top Dance/Electronic Albums (Billboard)	12
