= The Japanese Popstars =

Northern Irish electronic group

- Origin: Derry and Dungannon, Tyrone, Northern Ireland, United Kingdom
- Genres: Electro house
- Years active: 2006–present
- Label: Gung-Ho! Recordings
- Members: Gary Curran; Gareth Donoghue
- Past members: Declan McLaughlin (see Last Survivor)

The Japanese Popstars are an electronic music group from Northern Ireland consisting of Gary Curran and Gareth Donoghue (with former founding member and keyboardist Declan McLaughlin). Each member has his own alias. The act was nominated for "Best House DJs" at the 2006 World Urban Music Awards, "Best Live Performance" at the 2007 Northern Ireland Music Awards and won "Best Live Act" at the 2008 Irish Music Awards and then every year since (four years in a row). They were also voted "Best Breakthrough Producers" at the DJ Mag Best of British Awards 2008, awarded "No.1 Dance Album" by Hotpress magazine, and won "Best Live Act" and "Best Album" at the 2009 Irish Music Awards.

== History ==
Originally a trio with former member Declan McLaughlin (who now fronts Sirkus Sirkuz), they signed to indie label, in 2007 to Gung-Ho Recordings (GusGus, Zoo Brazil) in the UK, and Beatink in Japan (home of Underworld, Aphex Twin, and Cinematic Orchestra) but in 2010 then moved to Virgin Records. They have been referred to by people (particularly in Derry) as The Jappy Pops, Jap Pops, Popstars, the popstars or The Japstars.

In 2011 they released their second studio album 'Controlling Your Allegiance' which featured guest vocals from Robert Smith (The Cure), James Vincent McMorrow, Green Velvet, Lisa Hannigan, Tom Smith (Editors), Dot JR, Morgan Kibby (M83) and Jon Spencer (Blues Explosion).

They have also remixed the likes of Beyoncé, Daft Punk, Depeche Mode, The Ting Tings, Editors and many more, as well as playing the European MTV Music Awards Preparty live with Kasabian in 2011.

The band have played festivals around the world including Fuji Rock, Japan, Oxegen, Ireland, Sea Sessions, Ireland, Glastonbury Festival, UK, Electric Picnic, Ireland, Rockness, Scotland, Trans Musicales, France, Benicassim, Spain, Dour Festival, Belgium, Dance.Here.Now, New York, Camp Bisco, NY, Bestival, UK, Les Transardentes, Belgium, Sea of Love, Germany, Scopitone, France and many more.

Decky Hedrock has since split from the group to form Sirkus Sirkuz and a monthly radio show on RTÉ 2FM.

== Discography ==
=== Singles ===
- "Rodney Trotter" on Dozer Records
- "Dirty Popstars on Your Radio" on Dozer Records
- "EP1" which includes "Delboy's Revenge" & "Sample Whore" on Gung-Ho! Recordings
- Groove Armada Vs The Japanese Popstars "Get Down" on Strictly Rhythm
- "Rise of Ulysses" on Gung-Ho! Recordings
- "Face Melter" on Gung-Ho! Recordings
- "We Just Are (Finalizer)" on Gung-Ho! Recordings
- "B.C.T.T." on Gung-Ho! Recordings
- "Destroy" feat. Jon Spencer on Virgin Recordings
- "Let Go" feat. Green Velvet on Virgin Recordings
- "Song For Lisa" feat. Lisa Hannigan on Virgin Recordings
- "Joshua" feat. Tom Smith on Virgin Recordings
- "Take Forever" feat. Robert Smith on Virgin Recordings
- "Shells of Silver" feat. James Vincent McMorrow on Virgin Recordings

=== Studio albums ===
Year	Album details	Peak chart positions
Year	Album details	IRL
2008	We Just Are: Released: 7 August 2008; Label: Gung Ho!; Formats: CD, Download	89
2011	Controlling Your Allegiance: Released: 9 March 2011; Label: Beat Ink, Japan; Formats: CD, Download	—
2013	Disconnect / Reconnect: Released: 15 July 2013; Label: Bedrock Records; Formats: 2xCD, Download	—
"—" denotes releases that did not chart.

=== Live albums ===
Year	Album details	Chart peaks
Year	Album details	IRL
2009	We Just Are: Live: Released: 2009; Label: Gung Ho!; Format: DVD	—
"—" denotes a release that did not chart

=== Extended plays ===
Year	Album details
2011	Controlling Your Allegiance: Released: June 2011; Label: Virgin Records; Format: CD

== Remixes ==
- Cagedbaby – "16 Lovers" on Southern Fried/KSR
- Rob Hawk & MySoul – "So Shockin'" on Gung-Ho! Recordings
- Streetlife DJs – "Yo Jay" on Dozer
- Groove Armada vs. The Japanese Popstars – "Get Down" Strictly Rhythm
- Shinichi Osawa – "Star Guitar" on Data Records
- The Music – "Drugs" on Yes Please! Recordings
- Tong & Spoon – "Gas Face" on Television
- Grand National – "Cut by the Brakes" on Sunday Best
- The Ting Tings – "Be the One" on Sony
- Beyoncé – "If I Were A Boy" on RCA
- Beyoncé – "Single Ladies (Put a Ring on It)" on RCA
- Depeche Mode – "Peace" on EMI
- The New Devices – "Everything Good" on Sony
- Benny Benassi feat. Iggy Pop – "Electro Sixteen" on D:Vision
- Editors – "Papillon" on Columbia
- autoKratz – "Kick" on Kitsuné
- Gorillaz – "On Melancholy Hill" on Parlophone
- Thirty Seconds to Mars – "Closer to the Edge" on EMI
- Kylie Minogue – "Better than Today" on Parlophone
- Daft Punk – Tron: Legacy Reconfigured – "Arena" on Disney
- Daft Punk – Dconstructed – "Fall" Remix for Tron: Legacy on Disney

== Awards ==
Controlling Your Allegiance was nominated for the Choice Music Prize in January 2012.

Year	Nominee / work	Award	Result
2012	Controlling Your Allegiance	Irish Album of the Year 2011	Nominated
