= Andie Tong =

Malaysian-Australian comic book artist

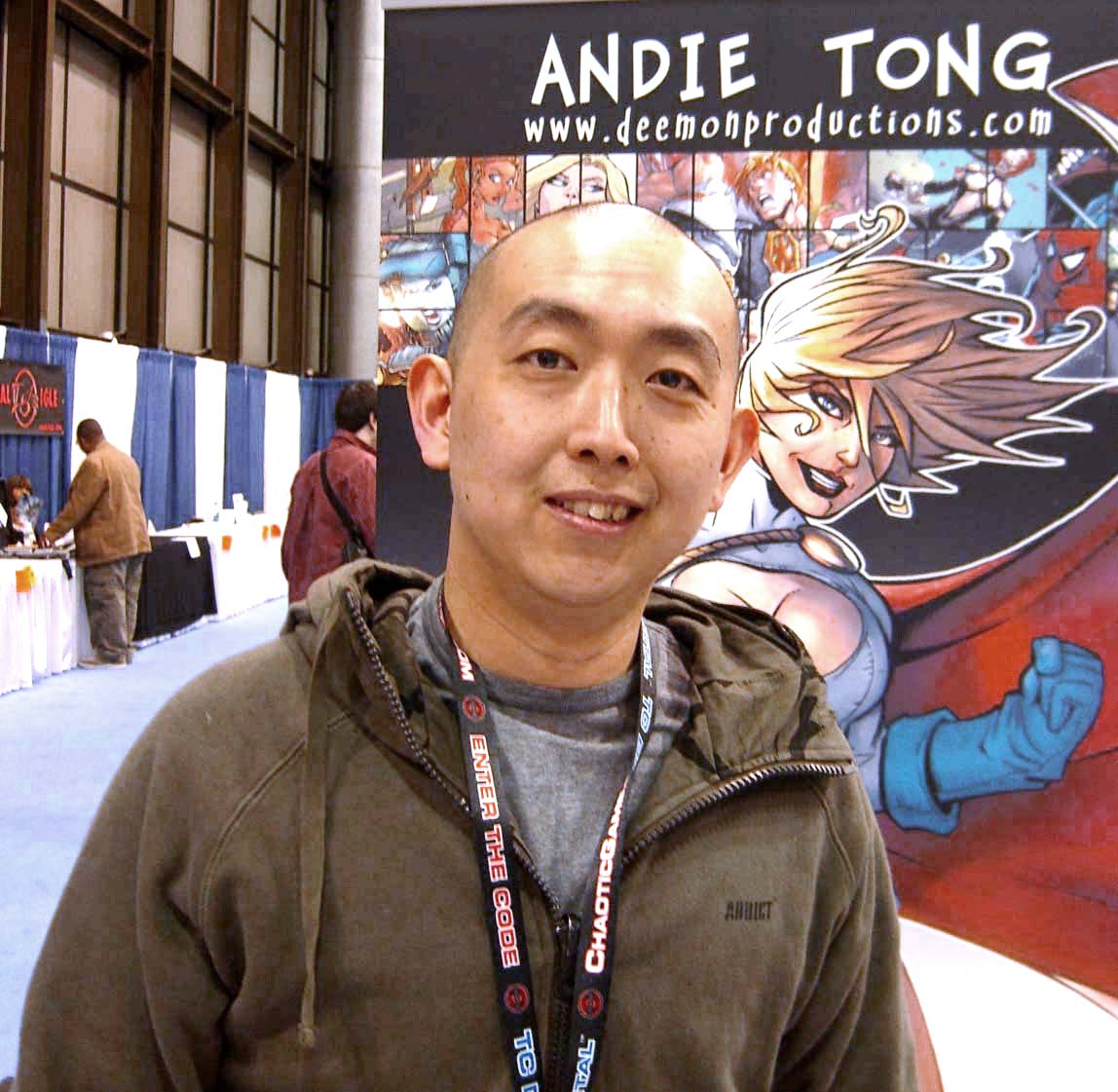
- Tong at the 2008 New York Comic Con
- Born: Malaysia
- Area: Artist
- Notable works: Zodiac Legacy; Green Lantern Legacy; The Legend of Shang-Chi; Tekken; Tron: Betrayal; The Spectacular Spider-Man UK; Masters of the Universe: Rise of the Snake Men

Andie Tong is a comic book artist, known for his work on books such as Green Lantern: Legacy, Legend of Shang-Chi, Tron: Betrayal, Spectacular Spider-Man UK, The Batman Strikes! and Tangent: Superman's Reign. He was born in Malaysia and grew up in Australia.

== Career ==
In 2000, Tong worked on a graphic novel, The Architect with Mike Baron, which was eventually published online through Big Head Press in 2006.

Tong was the regular artist for Spectacular Spiderman UK. During this period he also worked on covers and artwork for Teenage Mutant Ninja Turtles, Masters of the Universe, Starship Troopers and The Batman Strikes.

In 2010, Tong completed the Tron: Betrayal graphic novel, a prequel comic to the movie,Tron: Legacy. In 2010, he undertook illustrating duties on Dynamite Entertainment 's comic adaptation of Robert Jordan 's The Wheel of Time series. He also illustrated The Eye of the World: The Graphic Novel, Volume Two, Volume Four, and Volume Six published by Tor Books.

Since 2008, Tong illustrated several books for HarperCollins starring Batman and the Justice League. Tong currently illustrates a series of novels about wartime dogs titled "Soldier Dogs".

In 2013 Tong provided the artwork for the graphic novel, The First Law: The Blade Itself, based on the series of novels by British author Joe Abercrombie. In November of that year it was announced that Tong would be illustrating Disney's Zodiac Legacy, an illustrated novel created by Stan Lee and Stuart Moore, based on the Chinese zodiac. Book one named Convergence premiered in January 2015, followed by the second book, The Dragon's Return, in January 2016 and the final book, The Balance of Power, released in March 2017.

Dark Horse Comics compiled a Plants vs. Zombies comic, volume 4 titled, Grown Sweet Home, and released in June 2016. Tong switched his drawing approach for this title to accommodate the established style of the series. In October 2016, Titan Comics announced a new Tekken comic book, a four-issue mini-series by Cavan Scott, illustrated by Tong, and published in mid-2017. The series takes place between Tekken 6 and 7, and deals with Jin struggling against the Devil within him.

On 3 September 2020, it was announced that Tong would illustrate Street Fighter covers for Laced Records on its series of soundtracks to be released on vinyl. First in the range was Street Fighter III, followed by the Street Fighter Alpha series.

On 11 December 2020, Marvel Comics announced a one shot comic, The Legend of Shang-Chi, written by Alyssa Wong and illustrated by Tong. The comic was released two months later in February 2021 and features antagonist, X-Men villain, Lady Deathstrike. In January 2020, DC Comics released Green Lantern Legacy written by Minh Lê and illustrated by Tong. On 21 May 2021, DC Comics announced a Green Lantern: Legacy sequel titled Green Lantern Alliance to be released in April 2022 and will feature a new Kid Flash.

== Personal life ==
As of 2013, Tong lives in Singapore.
