= Sirkus Sirkuz =

Decky Hedrock
- Birth name: Declan McLaughlin
- Also known as: Decky Hedrock
- Origin: Derry, Northern Ireland
- Genres: Electro house, techno, electronica
- Occupation(s): DJ, music producer, radio show host
- Years active: 2012–2018
- Website: www.facebook.com/SirkusSirkuz

Declan McLaughlin, better known by his stage name Decky Hedrock, is an electronic music musician from Derry, Northern Ireland. A former member of the Northern Irish electro outfit The Japanese Popstars, Hedrock left the group in 2012 to pursue his career as Sirkus Sirkuz. Previous to that Declan was in Hedrock Valley Beats, another award-winning electronic act which received various chart success in different countries around the globe including a No.1 in Australia and National Airplay No.1 in the USA.

In his career, he has remixed songs by artists including Beyoncé, Depeche Mode, Ash, James, Benny Benassi, Kylie Minogue, and Gorillaz, under various aliases. He has also toured with Crookers, Vitalic, Bookashade, Deadmau5 as well as collaborating with the likes of Jon Spencer (Blues Explosion), Morgan Kibby of M83, and many others.

Sirkuz Sirkuz is also known to be the first ever artist to release three EPs with one record label on the same day. 'The Trilogy EP' was released on 3 November 2012 on 9G Records.

He hosted his own monthly dance show on Ireland largest radio station RTÉ 2fm called 'Sirkus Sirkuz Presents' and ‘The Decky Hedrock Show’.

Currently recording music with the band Last Survivor.

== Discography ==
=== Singles/EPs ===
- Hedrock Valley Beats – ‘Radio Beatbox’ on Brightstar Recordings
- Hedrock Valley Beats – ‘Coming Thru (My Stereo)’ on Infectious Records
- Hedrock Valley Beats – ‘Non-Stop’ on Freakaboom Recordings
- Hedrock Valley Beats – ‘King Of Rock’ on Freakaboom Recordings
- Hedrock Valley Beats – ‘Radio Beatbox’ on Freakaboom Recordings
- Sirkus Sirkuz – ‘Rapier’ on 9G Records
- Sirkus Sirkuz – ‘Plastic Explosive’ on 9G Records
- Sirkus Sirkuz – ‘Little Rodent’ on 9G Records
- Sirkus Sirkuz – ‘Telefunk’ on 9G Records
- Shadow Dancer Vs Sirkus Sirkuz – ‘Build / Use’ on GND Records
- Sirkus Sirkuz – ‘Forgiveness’
- Shadow Dancer Vs Sirkus Sirkuz – ‘Build / Use REMIXED’ on GND Records
- Sirkus Sirkuz feat. Deci Gallen– ‘Break The Silence' on Hottwerk Records
- Sirkus Sirkuz Vs March Against feat. Wyldling - 'The Tempest' on 9G Records
- Sirkus Sirkuz - 'Trouble Bug' on CRUX Records
- Peter Silbermann Vs Sirkus Sirkuz - 'Keep On Giving' on Rocstar Records
- Sirkus Sirkuz - 'Ass Boogie' on 9G Records
- Sirkus Sirkuz - 'Annihilating Rhythm' on 9G Records
- Sirkus Sirkuz - 'Ghostcheck' on SoundCloud
- Wax Hands & Sirkus Sirkuz - 'Acid Elephant' on Toastclub Recordings
- Nitemode & Sirkus Sirkuz - 'Ravival' on CRUX Records
- Sirkus Sirkuz - 'Dying Star' on 9G Records
- Sirkus Sirkuz - 'Ahhhh-Seid Love' on SoundCloud
- Sirkus Sirkuz - 'Rave On' on My Techno Weighs A Ton
- Sirkus Sirkuz - 'Nothing Changes' on SoundCloud
- Sirkus Sirkuz - 'Probe Droid' on RDL47 Records
- Sirkus Sirkuz - 'The Try Outs / Wolfrider EP' on Vox Nox Records
- Sirkus Sirkuz - 'Paranoid' on Whartone Records
- Sirkus Sirkuz - 'Rattle Meat' on Whartone Records
- Sirkus Sirkuz feat. Jilly St John - 'Discozone' on Whartone Records
- Sirkus Sirkuz Feat. Mark Zowie - 'I Know' on Whartone Records
- Last Survivor - 'Waste Away' on Atlantic Traxx
- Last Survivor - 'Staring At The Moon' on Riot Synth Roit Records
- Last Survivor - 'The Wasp' on Riot Synth Riot Records
- Last Survivor - 'Midnight Run' on Riot Synth Riot Records

=== Remixes ===
- Crossfaders feat. Chuckie Campell – ‘Four Elements (Sirkus Sirkuz Mix)' on 9G Records
- Run Riot – ‘Lose Yourself (Sirkus Sirkuz Mix)’ on Skint Records
- Moorr – ‘Spaceboy Goes To Vegas (Sirkus Sirkuz Mix)’ on 9G Records
- Replicants – ‘ETA (Sirkus Sirkuz Mix)’ on Psychonavigation Records
- Shane Fontane – ‘All I Need (Sirkus Sirkuz Mix)’ on 9G Records
- 4 Quarters Boyz – ‘Future (Sirkus Sirkuz Mix)’ on Crux Records
- Maud In Cahoots - 'Dance With Me'
- Tijuana – ‘Heaven Bound (Sirkus Sirkuz Mix)’ on Rocstar Records
- A Plastic Rose – ‘Kids Dont Behave Like This (Sirkus Sirkuz Mix)’ on Di Di Mau Records
- Nerd Flanders - 'Retsina (Sirkus Sirkuz Mix)' on My Techno Weighs A Ton
- Unique 3 - 'Feels All Good (Sirkus Sirkuz Mix)' on Rocstar Records
- Adam Schock & Ed Liner - 'Heart (Sirkus Sirkuz Mix)' on Tanz Kultur Records
- Cakeboy - 'Damage (Sirkus Sirkuz Mix)' on Rocstar Records
- DPPLGNGRS - 'Poindexter (Sirkus Sirkuz Mix)' on Hotwerk Records
- Rob DeLarge - 'A Deep And Gorgeous Thirst (Sirkus Sirkuz Mix)' on RDL47 Records
- I Need? - 'Paranoid (Sirkus Sirkuz Mix)' on CRUX Records
- Galactus - 'The Gauntlet (Sirkus Sirkuz Mix)' on 9G Records
- Sovnger - 'Catharsis (Sirkus Sirkuz Mix)' on Police Records
- Cut La Roc - 'Freeze (Sirkus Sirkuz Mix)' on Skint Records
- Rory Lyons and Doorly - 'Sun Rising (Sirkus Sirkuz Mix)' on Free download
- Zeskullz - 'Devil (Sirkus Sirkuz Mix)' on Vicious B1tch Records
