= Messages: Syntax / Error =

Messages: Syntax
- Cover of Syntax

EP by Ki:Theory
- Released: April 14, 2011
- Genre: Electronic music

Ki:Theory chronology
Remix EP 2 (2010)	Messages: Syntax (2011)	Killer Shots (2011)

Messages: Syntax / Error is a digitally released "two sided" EP by Ki:Theory, released on April 14, 2011.

== Messages: Syntax ("Side" One) ==
1. "Bat Penatar" – 1:46
2. "All the Same" – 2:22
3. "Mood Board" – 1:55
4. "Trust" – 2:19
5. "Busy Body" – 2:34
6. "Hobby Shop" – 1:58
7. "Step Outside" – 3:05
8. "Daily Routine" – 1:33
9. "Save Our City" – 2:12

== Messages: Error ("Side" Two) ==
1. "Coincidence"
2. "We Will Becomes Ourselves Reborn"
3. "Gloss"
4. "Mother Brain"
5. "Ouija"
6. "Skeptic Believer"
7. "Scare Myself"
8. "Unmediated"
9. "Yosemite"
