= Derezzed =

2010 song by Daft Punk

- Single cover

Single by Daft Punk

from the album Tron: Legacy
- Released: December 8, 2010
- Recorded: 2008–2010
- Studio: AIR Lyndhurst Studios (London)
- Genre: Electro house
- Length: 1:44
- Label: Walt Disney
- Songwriters: Thomas Bangalter; Guy-Manuel de Homem-Christo
- Producer: Daft Punk

Daft Punk singles chronology
"Harder, Better, Faster, Stronger (Alive 2007)" (2007)	"Derezzed" (2010)	"Get Lucky" (2013)

Music video
- "Derezzed" on YouTube

"Derezzed" is an instrumental song written, produced and performed by Daft Punk for the soundtrack of the motion picture Tron: Legacy, available on the album of the same name. As a pre-order bonus for the album on the iTunes Store, "Derezzed" was released by Walt Disney Records as a single on December 8, 2010. It was remixed by The Glitch Mob and Avicii for the remix albums Tron: Legacy Reconfigured and Dconstructed. "Derezzed" was also included on a 4-track vinyl EP titled Translucence, released by Walt Disney Records.

== Music video ==
The music video for "Derezzed" was directed by Warren Fu. It begins as Daft Punk enters Flynn Arcade and approaches the ENCOM game called Derezzed. They insert quarters and start playing, with Guy-Manuel de Homem-Christo playing as Prog 1 and Thomas Bangalter as Prog 2. The music starts just as Bangalter presses his "start" button. The Derezzed game plays out as a joust with light cycles in the grid. As an indiscernible program watches the joust in the distance, Prog 2 wins the match. In the arcade, de Homem-Christo is disappointed. Back in the grid, Prog 2 is revealed to be Quorra (Olivia Wilde).

== Track listings ==
CDr Promotional Single (BVPRO03242)
No.	Title	Length
1.	"Derezzed"	1:44
Total length:		1:44

Translucence (STDDTRON10 ST01)
No.	Title	Length
1.	"Derezzed"	1:44
2.	"Tron Legacy (End Titles)"	3:17
3.	"End of Line"	2:36
4.	"Castor"	2:18
Total length:		9:55

== Chart positions ==
=== Weekly charts ===
Chart (2010–14)	Peak position
Australia (ARIA)	92
Belgium (Ultratip Bubbling Under Flanders)	29
Belgium (Ultratip Bubbling Under Wallonia)	18
France (SNEP)	81
US Bubbling Under Hot 100 (Billboard)	3
US Hot Dance/Electronic Songs (Billboard) Avicii "So Amazing Mix" featuring Negin	27
US Dance Club Songs (Billboard) Avicii "So Amazing Mix" featuring Negin	1

=== Year-end charts ===
Chart (2014)	Position
US Dance Club Songs (Billboard)	28

== Certifications ==
Region	Certification	Certified units/sales
United States (RIAA)	Gold	500,000^{‡}
^{‡} Sales+streaming figures based on certification alone.

== See also ==
- List of number-one dance singles of 2014 (U.S.)
