= Tron: Betrayal =

American comic book miniseries

- Tron: Betrayal #1.

Publication information
- Publisher: Marvel Comics
- Schedule: Monthly
- Format: Limited series
- Genre: Science fiction
- Publication date: October – November 2010
- No. of issues: 2

Creative team
- Written by: Jai Nitz
- Penciller(s): Jeff Matsuda; Andie Tong
- Inker: Pete Pantazis
- Letterer: John J. Hill

Collected editions
- Tron: Betrayal: ISBN 1-4231-3463-X

Tron: Betrayal is a two-issue comic book miniseries which serves as the official lead-in to the film Tron: Legacy and was published by Marvel Comics beginning in October 2010.

== Description ==
The series is set in 1983, shortly after the events of the original film Tron. Kevin Flynn has become the CEO of the software company Encom, which he has built into the largest video-game company in the world while secretly building the Grid, a virtual reality inhabited by increasingly sentient programs, ultimately including the mysterious "isomorphic algorithms" ("ISO" for short).

As his responsibilities in the real world increase, Flynn creates Clu 2, a duplicate of himself meant to serve as his proxy. In Flynn's absence, Clu 2 becomes resentful of the ISOs, perceiving them as a threat to the "perfect system" he wishes to maintain. Clu 2 forestalls the ISOs' emergence from the 'Sea of Simulation' and drives Flynn himself into exile.

The story introduces Flynn's son, Sam Flynn, who is the protagonist of Tron: Legacy. The epilogue of Betrayal overlaps slightly with the beginning of Tron: Legacy and the events of the 2010 video game Tron: Evolution, in which Clu 2 moves against the ISOs and Kevin Flynn.

== Collected editions ==
Tron: Betrayal was then collected as a 128-page trade paperback by Disney Press in November 2010 (ISBN 1-4231-3463-X), which contains a new 11-page retelling of the 1982 film Tron, illustrated by Jeff Matsuda.

== Reception ==
IGN reviewed the comic and gave it a "passable" score of 6.5 out of 10.
