= Jason Bentley =

American DJ (born 1970)

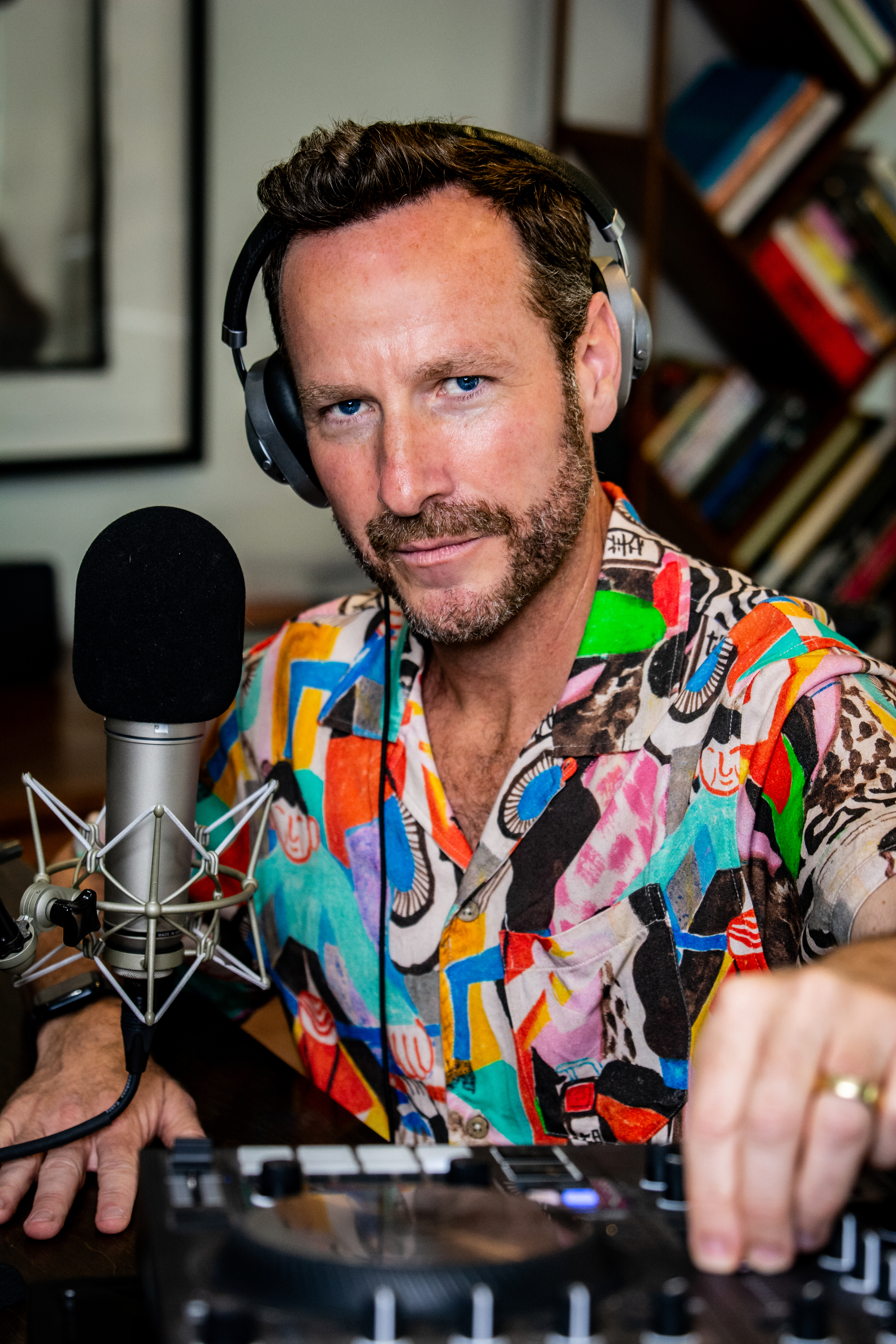
- Bentley, May 2024

Background information
- Born: July 27, 1970 (age 56)
- Genres: Electronic; dance
- Occupations: DJ; radio presenter; producer; music executive
- Years active: 1992–present

Jason Bentley (born July 27, 1970) is an American DJ, producer, and music executive playing an influential role in the evolution of dance and electronic music in the U.S. He has hosted music programs on a variety of commercial and public radio stations, Bentley served as music director of KCRW from 2009 to 2019. He hosted their daily music show Morning Becomes Eclectic during that time and is the host of a weekly show, Metropolis, at the station. He has been a featured DJ at major festivals and events. He is a Grammy nominated music producer, having supervised music for films including the Matrix trilogy, TRON Legacy, and consulting for Top Gun: Maverick. He was on the Board of Governors of The Recording Academy, advocating for more inclusion of dance music into the program.

== Early life ==
Born in Tallahassee, Florida, Bentley moved to Boston with his mother when his parents divorced. He grew up in Boston and Los Angeles, eventually settling in Santa Monica, California in 1983. In the summer of 1988, after graduating from high school, he started volunteering at KCRW,- a public radio station with a unique range of music programming, including shows such as Morning Becomes Eclectic, The Reggae Beat, SNAP, and Steppin’ Out. He answered phones at reception for the station and worked in the station's music library before attending college in Massachusetts.

== Early career ==
Bentley was educated at University of Massachusetts Amherst and then Loyola Marymount in Los Angeles getting involved in the college radio stations at both schools, WMUA and KXLU, respectively. At WMUA, Bentley channeled his admiration for KCRW, emulating the programming style of Tom Schnabel's Morning Becomes Eclectic with a program he called Nomad. At KXLU, Bentley created The Illicit Groove, a late night mix show featuring the spectrum of underground dance music. He also served as the production director for live performances in-studio eventually becoming KXLU's general manager.

== Career ==
At a friendly softball game between KXLU and KCRW, Bentley was invited to host a regular air shift on KCRW by music director Chris Douridas. His global dance and electronic music mix show, Metropolis. began in the summer of 1992, and Bentley has been on the air at KCRW ever since. Through early radio programs on KXLU (The Illicit Groove) and KCRW (Metropolis), he helped introduce a burgeoning underground dance music scene to a wider audience in the early ‘90s, bringing DJ culture to the fore on radio through programming which incorporates the storytelling aspect of being a DJ.

By the mid-‘90s, as dance music was coalescing and finding a mainstream audience, Bentley was recruited by commercial alternative radio station KROQ for a weekend dance mix program called Afterhours, which he produced for 14 years. He was part of the founding group behind urban culture publication, Urb, joining as the magazine's first managing editor in 1991, in turn exposing him to the underground rave scene in Los Angeles, which was taking off. As a music journalist he covered the scene, mixed, and promoted the music on radio and DJed many underground events as dance culture in the U.S. took shape. He was a featured DJ at the earliest iterations of the Electric Daisy Carnival, Organic ’96, GIANT events, Nocturnal Wonderland, Circa, Narnia, the first HARD Festival, CRSSD, and the first two Coachella festivals, among others.

Bentley founded Quango Music Group in 1995 with partners Bruno Guez and George Ghiz. As an extension of Quango being a lifestyle brand, Bentley and his label partners began a club series, Bossanova, staging popular club nights in Los Angeles. Bossanova hosted a range of guest artists during its run including Daft Punk, Massive Attack, James Lavelle, The Orb, Gilles Peterson, Thievery Corporation, and many others. Bentley departed Quango amicably in 1998 when he was recruited by Maverick Records to be in a high profile A&R role.

At Maverick, Bentley worked on Madonna's campaigns, as well as with label artists The Prodigy, Paul Oakenfold, Meshell Ndegeocello, and was nominated for a Grammy award as producer/music supervisor for the soundtrack for The Matrix. He was the music supervisor for the next two Matrix films, The Matrix Reloaded and The Matrix Revolutions. He continued working as a music supervisor in television, video games, and for Disney’s Tron: Legacy (2010) with a score by Daft Punk, as well as consulting on the 2013 film Oblivion with music by M83, and Top Gun Maverick in 2022.

Bentley joined The Recording Academy serving on the Board of Governors, various awards committees, and the Grammy telecast committee for several years. He helped to author the first proposal to adopt an album category for dance music, a genre which had previously only been a "singles" category. He advocated for more inclusion for artists from dance music on the annual telecast.

In 2008 he was the DJ at the 80th Governors Ball Oscars after party, making history by being the first DJ to do so. He performed there again in 2009. Bentley was the music director of NPR affiliate KCRW in Santa Monica for about a decade (2009–2019), hosting their daily music variety show Morning Becomes Eclectic during that time. Embracing a broader palette of music in his position there, he contributed to the advancement of the careers of countless indie rock and alternative artists through regular airplay, live performance sessions, and event programming with local arts and culture institutions including the Hollywood Bowl, The Hammer Museum, and the Annenberg Foundation. He continues to support dance culture through fundraising events for public radio like the station's annual Halloween Masquerade Ball and Chinatown Summer Nights. On Morning Becomes Eclectic, he presented performance sessions and interviews with today's biggest artists including Adele, John Legend, Elton John, Jack White, Hans Zimmer, Vampire Weekend, and Beck among many others. From 2014 to 2019 Bentley hosted the YouTube / AXS TV exclusive livestream coverage of the Coachella festival. He hosts and produces Metropolis every Saturday night on KCRW.
