= Tron: Legacy =

2010 film by Joseph Kosinski

- Theatrical release poster
- Directed by: Joseph Kosinski
- Screenplay by: Edward Kitsis; Adam Horowitz
- Story by: Edward Kitsis; Adam Horowitz; Brian Klugman; Lee Sternthal
- Based on: Characters by: Steven Lisberger; Bonnie MacBird
- Produced by: Sean Bailey; Jeffrey Silver; Steven Lisberger
- Starring: Jeff Bridges; Garrett Hedlund; Olivia Wilde; Bruce Boxleitner; Michael Sheen
- Cinematography: Claudio Miranda
- Edited by: James Haygood
- Music by: Daft Punk
- Production companies: Walt Disney Pictures; Sean Bailey Productions
- Distributed by: Walt Disney Studios Motion Pictures
- Release dates: November 30, 2010 (Tokyo); December 17, 2010 (United States)
- Running time: 125 minutes
- Country: United States
- Language: English
- Budget: $170 million
- Box office: $409.9 million

Tron: Legacy is a 2010 American science fiction action film directed by Joseph Kosinski, and written by Adam Horowitz and Edward Kitsis. It is the second installment in the Tron film series and a sequel to Tron (1982). The film stars Jeff Bridges, Garrett Hedlund, Olivia Wilde, Bruce Boxleitner, and Michael Sheen. The story follows Kevin Flynn's adult son Sam, who responds to a message from his long-lost father and is transported into a virtual reality called "the Grid", where Sam, his father, and the program Quorra must stop the malevolent digital mirror image of Kevin Flynn, Clu, from invading the real world.

Interest in creating a sequel to Tron arose after the film garnered a cult following. After much speculation, Walt Disney Pictures began a concerted effort in 2005 to develop a sequel, hiring Brian Klugman and Lee Sternthal as writers. Kosinski was recruited as director two years later. As he was not optimistic about Disney's The Matrix-esque approach to the film, Kosinski filmed a concept trailer to conceptualize the universe of Tron: Legacy and convince the studio to greenlight the film. Principal photography took place in Vancouver over 67 days, in and around the city's central business district. Most sequences were shot in 3D and ten companies were involved in the extensive visual effects work. Chroma keying and other techniques were used to allow more freedom in creating effects. French electronic music duo Daft Punk composed the film's musical score, releasing a soundtrack album that incorporates their trademark electronic sound with orchestral arrangements.

Tron: Legacy premiered in Tokyo on November 30, 2010, and was released in the United States on December 17, by Walt Disney Studios Motion Pictures. Disney vigorously promoted the film across multiple media platforms, including merchandising, consumer products, theme parks, and advertising. The film received mixed reviews from critics, and was a commercial success, grossing $409.9 million against a $170 million budget. The film was nominated for Best Sound Editing at the 83rd Academy Awards. Like its predecessor, Tron: Legacy has been described as a cult film since its release. A sequel, Tron: Ares, was released in 2025.

== Plot ==
In 1989, Kevin Flynn, the CEO of ENCOM, disappears. Twenty years later, his son Sam, now ENCOM's primary shareholder, pranks the corporation by releasing the company's signature operating system online for free. ENCOM executive Alan Bradley, Kevin's old friend, approves of this, believing it aligns with Flynn's ideals of free software; nonetheless, Sam is arrested for trespassing.

Alan posts bail for Sam and tells him of a pager message originating from Flynn's shuttered video arcade, which has been disconnected since his disappearance. There, Sam discovers a hidden basement with a large computer and particle laser, which suddenly digitizes and uploads him onto the Grid, a virtual reality created by Kevin. He is captured and sent to "the Games", where he must fight a masked computer program named Rinzler. When Sam is injured and bleeds, Rinzler realizes Sam is human, or a "User". He takes Sam to Clu, the Grid's corrupt ruling program, who resembles a young Kevin.

Clu nearly kills Sam in a Light Cycle match, but Sam is rescued by Quorra, a skilled warrior and "apprentice" of Flynn, who takes him to Kevin's hideout outside Clu's territory. Kevin explains that he had been working to create a "perfect" computer system and had appointed Clu and security program Tron as its co-creators. The trio discovered a species of naturally occurring "isomorphic algorithms" (ISOs), with the potential to resolve various natural mysteries. Clu, considering them an abnormality, betrayed Kevin, killed Tron, and destroyed the ISOs. The "Portal" permitting travel between the two worlds closed, leaving Kevin trapped in the system. Clu sent the message to Alan, hoping to lure him into the Grid (though Sam serves his purpose just as well) and reopen the Portal for a limited time. Since Flynn's "identity disc" is the master key to the Grid and the only way to traverse the Portal, Clu expects Sam to bring Kevin to the Portal so he can take Flynn's disc, go through the Portal himself, and impose his idea of perfection on the human world.

Against his father's wishes, Sam returns to Clu's territory and encounters one of the Sirens, named Gem, to help find Zuse, a program who can provide safe passage to the Portal. At the End of Line Club, the owner, Castor, reveals himself to be Zuse, then betrays Sam to Clu's guards. In the resulting fight, Kevin rescues his son, but Quorra's arm is damaged and Castor gains possession of Flynn's disc. Castor attempts to bargain with Clu over the disc, but Clu instead destroys the club along with Castor and Gem. Kevin and Sam stow away aboard a "Solar Sailer" transport program, where Flynn repairs Quorra and reveals her as the last surviving ISO.

The transport is intercepted by Clu's warship. As a diversion, Quorra allows herself to be captured by Rinzler, whom Kevin recognizes as Tron, not killed by Clu but rather reprogrammed. Sam reclaims Flynn's disc and rescues Quorra, while Kevin takes control of a Light Fighter. Clu, Rinzler, and several guards pursue the trio in Light Jets. Rinzler remembers his past as Tron and deliberately collides with Clu's Light Jet to save Flynn. Clu, enraged by Rinzler betraying him, fights Rinzler in midair, taking his spare baton to spawn another Light Jet. Rinzler plunges into the Sea of Simulation. Clu confronts the others at the Portal, but Kevin reintegrates with his digital duplicate, destroying Clu along with himself. Quorra – having switched discs with Kevin – gives Flynn's disc to Sam, and they escape together to the real world as the ensuing explosion from Kevin's sacrifice destroys Clu's warship and levels the area around the Portal.

In Flynn's Arcade, Sam backs up and deactivates the system. He then tells a waiting Alan that he plans to retake control of ENCOM, naming Alan chairman of the board. Sam departs on his motorcycle with Quorra as the sun rises.

== Cast ==
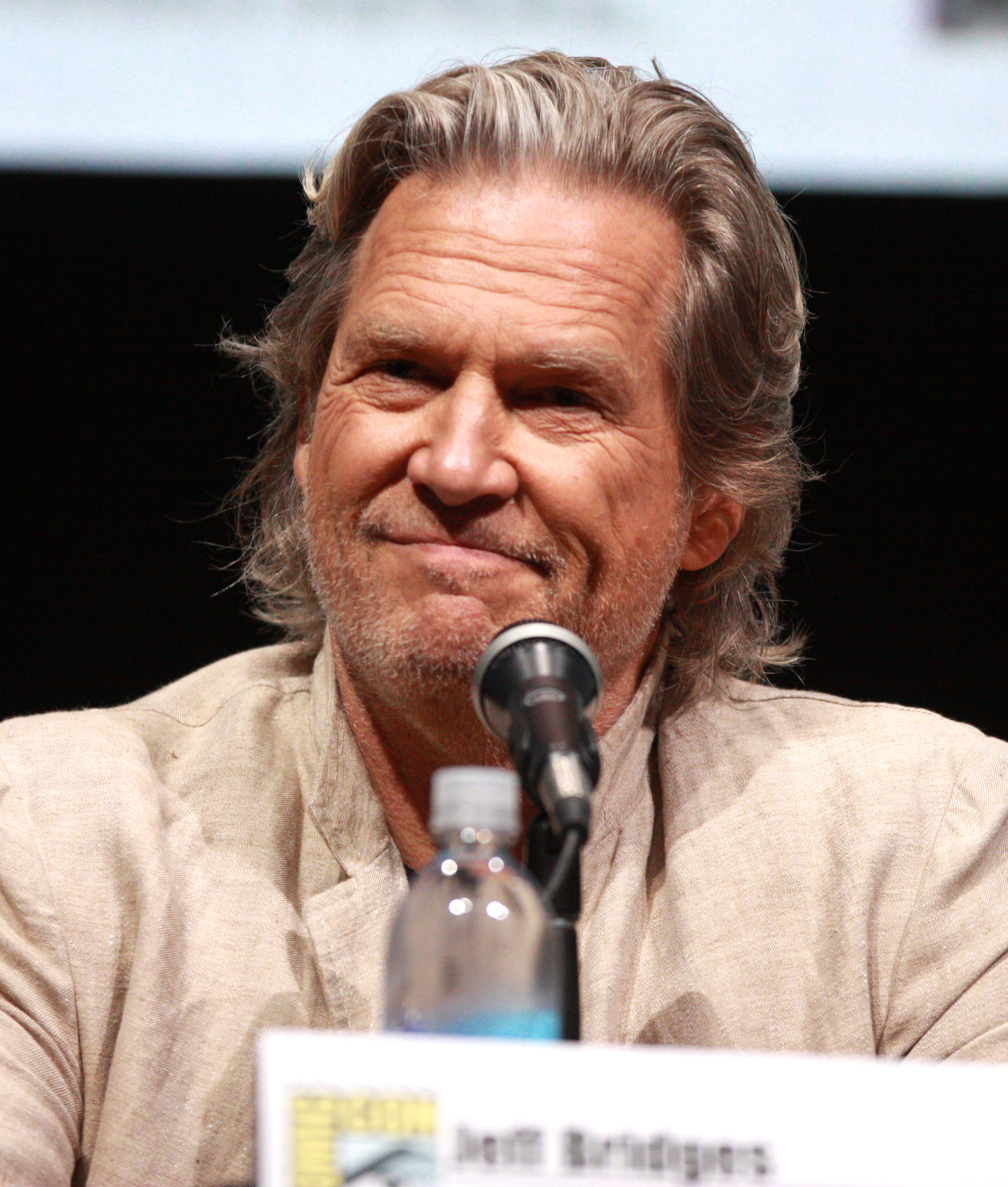
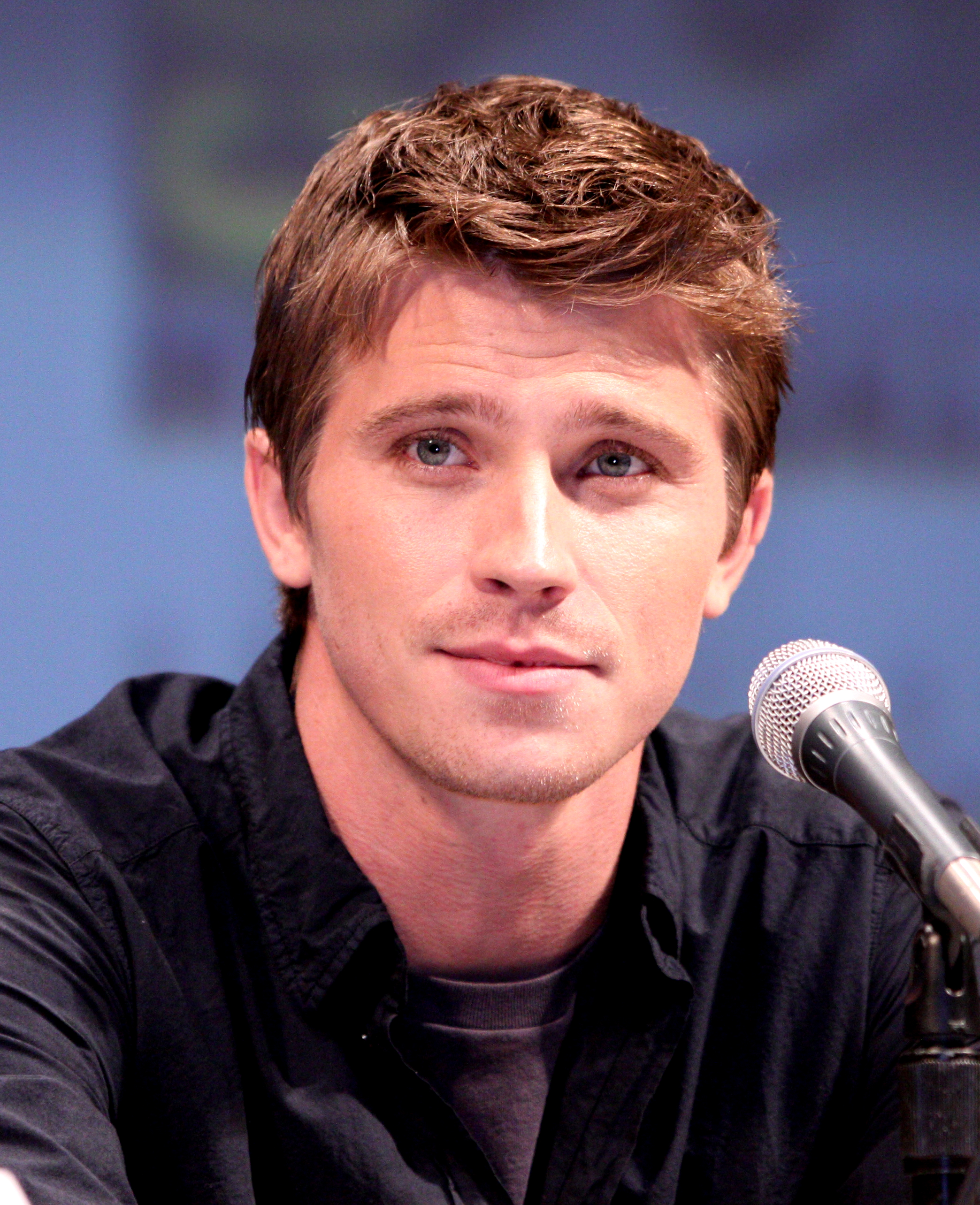
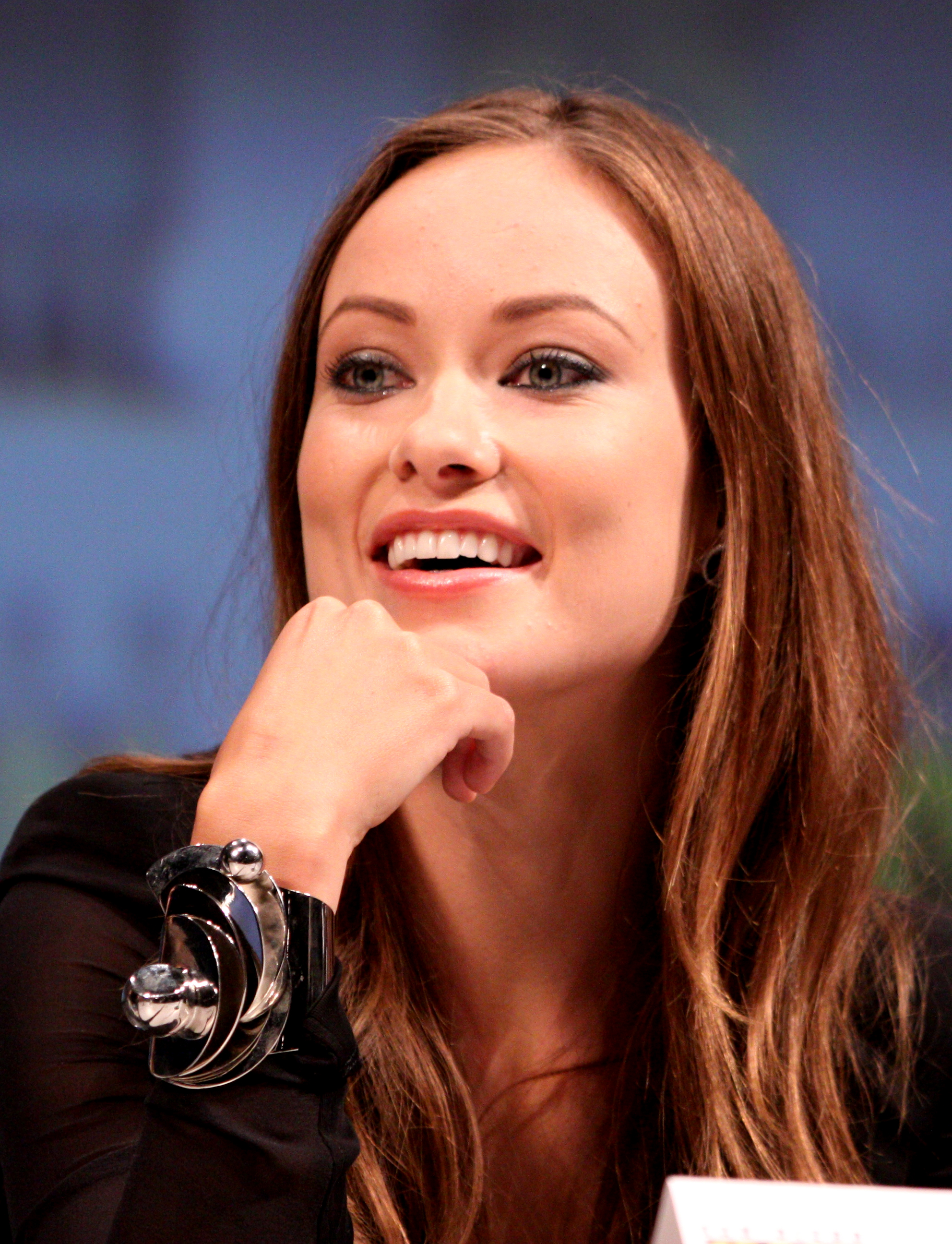
Top to bottom: Jeff Bridges, Garrett Hedlund, and Olivia Wilde star in the film.
- Jeff Bridges as Kevin Flynn, the former CEO of ENCOM International and creator of the popular arcade game Tron based on his own experiences in ENCOM's virtual reality, who disappeared in 1989 while developing "a digital frontier that will reshape the human condition."
  - Bridges also portrays CLU (Codified Likeness Utility) via digital de-aging and voiceover, while John Reardon portrays CLU physically. CLU is a more advanced incarnation of Flynn's original computer-hacking program, designed as an "exact duplicate of himself" within the Grid.
- Garrett Hedlund as Samuel "Sam" Flynn, Kevin‘s son, who, while investigating his father's disappearance, is transported onto the Grid himself. Hedlund won a "Darwinian casting process" which tested hundreds of actors, being chosen for having the "unique combination of intelligence, wit, humor, look and physicality" that the producers were looking for in Flynn's son. The actor trained hard to do his own stunts, which included jumping over cars and copious wire and harness work.
  - Owen Best as Young Sam Flynn.
- Olivia Wilde as Quorra, an "isomorphic algorithm". Flynn refers to her as his "apprentice" and has imparted volumes of information to her regarding the world outside of the Grid, which she longs to experience. She is shown to have a love of human literature, particularly the writings of Jules Verne, and plays Go with Flynn. Wilde describes Quorra as akin to Joan of Arc. Her hairstyle was influenced by singer Karen O. Wilde added that although "[Quorra] could have just been another slinky, vampy temptress," it was important for her to appeal to both men and women, and that character tried to avoid the typical female lead by having a naiveté and childlike innocence adequate for such an "evolving and learning organism." Quorra's action scenes led Wilde to work out and train in martial arts.
- Bruce Boxleitner as Alan Bradley, a board member executive for ENCOM, and close friend of Kevin Flynn.
  - Boxleitner also portrays Tron / Rinzler, a security program originally developed by Bradley to monitor ENCOM's Master Control Program and later reassigned by Flynn to defend the Grid. He was overpowered and re-purposed by Clu as Rinzler. Anis Cheurfa, a stunt actor, portrayed Rinzler, while Boxleitner provided the dialogue and was also digitally de-aged as Tron in flashback sequences. Rinzler is named after author and Lucasfilm Executive Editor J. W. Rinzler.
- James Frain as Jarvis, an administration program who serves as CLU's right-hand man. Frain had to shave his head, bleach his eyebrows white, and wear make-up. The refraction on Jarvis's helmet led Frain to walk in a "slightly squinty, blind stagger" which the actor felt was helpful to get him into character. Frain described Jarvis as "a fun, comic character that's a little off-beat," considering him "more human, in terms of being fallible and absurd" compared to the zanier Castor.
- Beau Garrett appears as Gem, one of four programs known as Sirens. The Sirens operate the Grid's game armory, while also reporting to Castor.
- Michael Sheen as Zuse / Castor, a flamboyant probability program with dubious loyalties. Sheen describes his performance as containing elements of performers such as David Bowie, Joel Grey from Cabaret, and a bit of Frank-N-Furter from The Rocky Horror Show.

Serinda Swan, Yaya DaCosta, and Elizabeth Mathis depict the other three Sirens. Jeffrey Nordling stars as Richard Mackey, the chairman of ENCOM's executive board, and Cillian Murphy makes an uncredited appearance as Edward Dillinger Jr., the head of ENCOM's software design team and the son of former ENCOM Senior Executive Ed Dillinger portrayed by David Warner in the original film. Daft Punk, who composed the score for the film, cameo as disc jockey programs, and Tron creator Steven Lisberger makes an appearance as Shaddix, a bartender.

== Production ==
=== Background ===
Steven Lisberger relocated to Boston, Massachusetts, from Philadelphia, Pennsylvania, in the 1970s to pursue a career in computer animation. Since the computer animation field was mainly concentrated in Los Angeles, Lisberger had very little competition operating on the East Coast: "Nobody back then did Hollywood stuff, so there was no competition and no one telling us that we couldn't do it." He later produced and directed the science fiction film Tron (1982) for Walt Disney Productions, the first computer animation-based feature film. Although the film garnered some critical praise, it generated only modest sales at the box office — the cumulative North American gross was just $33 million. Producer Sean Bailey, who saw the film with his father and Lisberger, was captivated by the finished product. Although Tron performed below Disney's expectations, it later developed a cult following, which fueled speculation of Pixar's alleged interest in creating a sequel, in 1999. Rumors of a Tron sequel were further ignited after the 2003 release of the first-person shooter video game, Tron 2.0. Lisberger hinted that a third installment could be in the works, depending on the commercial success of the game.

=== Writing ===
"For us, it was if we're going to revisit this movie and try to take it forward, we're the children of Tron. We grew up on it. It informed us. It really helped shape us and get us excited about the possibilities of technology and film and all that stuff. It's one of the reasons we're doing what we're doing – so in that way its like how can we approach this movie in a way that as writers we have an emotional entry point ourselves."

— Adam Horowitz

Shortly after hiring Kosinski, Bailey approached the screenwriting duo Adam Horowitz and Edward Kitsis, who accepted because they were self-described "obsessed about Tron." Horowitz later claimed the challenge was to "homage the first movie, continue the story, expand it and take it to another place and open up space for new fans," and Kitsis claimed that the film would start a whole new mythology "of which we're only scratching the surface." Horowitz and Kitsis first created a story outline, and developed and fine-tuned the plot with Bailey and Kosinski across a period of two days in La Quinta. The writers also consulted Lisberger to view Tron's creator input on the story. Lisberger gave his blessing, particularly as he has a son the same age as Sam, which Kitsis stated that "was like we had tapped into something he was feeling without even realizing it." The Pixar team contributed with rewrites for additional shooting after being shown a rough cut in March 2010, which helped in particular to the development of Sam's story line.

The writing staff cited The Wizard of Oz as a source of thematic influence for Tron: Legacy in writing the script, with Kitsis stating that "They both have very similar DNA, which is Tron really lives on, in a lot of ways, trying to get home. You're put on this world and you want to go home and what is home? That's in a lot of way inspired us." Kitsis also added that they had to include an "emotional spine to take us into the story or else it just becomes a bunch of moves or gags and stuff," eventually deciding on adding a mysterious destiny to Flynn and giving him a legendary aura – "Kevin Flynn to us was Steve Jobs and Bill Gates all wrapped up into one and John Lennon." The writers decided to create the character of Clu as an evil embodiment of "how you look back on your younger self, (...) that guy [that] thought he knew everything, but he really knew nothing." Bridges liked the idea of dual perspectives and contributed to the writers' characterization of Flynn as a sanguine Zen master by suggesting they draw inspiration from various Buddhist texts. Part of the concepts emerged from a reunion the producers had with scientists from California Institute of Technology and the Jet Propulsion Laboratory to discuss concepts such as isomorphic algorithms and the digitizing of organic matter.

Horowitz revealed the film would contain many light cycle battles, and asserted that the script for the scenes were "incredibly detailed," and involved an intricate collaborative process. For the disc game, Horowitz and Kitsis wrote a rough draft of the scene, and sent the script to Kosinski; he summarized his perspective of the sequence's visuals to them. "He described them as these underlying platforms," said Horowitz, "that would then coalesce and then the way you would go from round to round in the game is you defeat someone, they kinda come together as you see in the movie." After giving his input, Kosinski sent various sketches of the scene to the writers and would often revise the script. Kitsis thought that illustrating the character's stories was the most difficult task in writing Tron: Legacy. The writers collaborated with the creative process throughout production, which was helpful especially considering the difficulties of describing in a tangible way a digital world that "in its very nature defies basic screenwriting conventions."

=== Conception ===
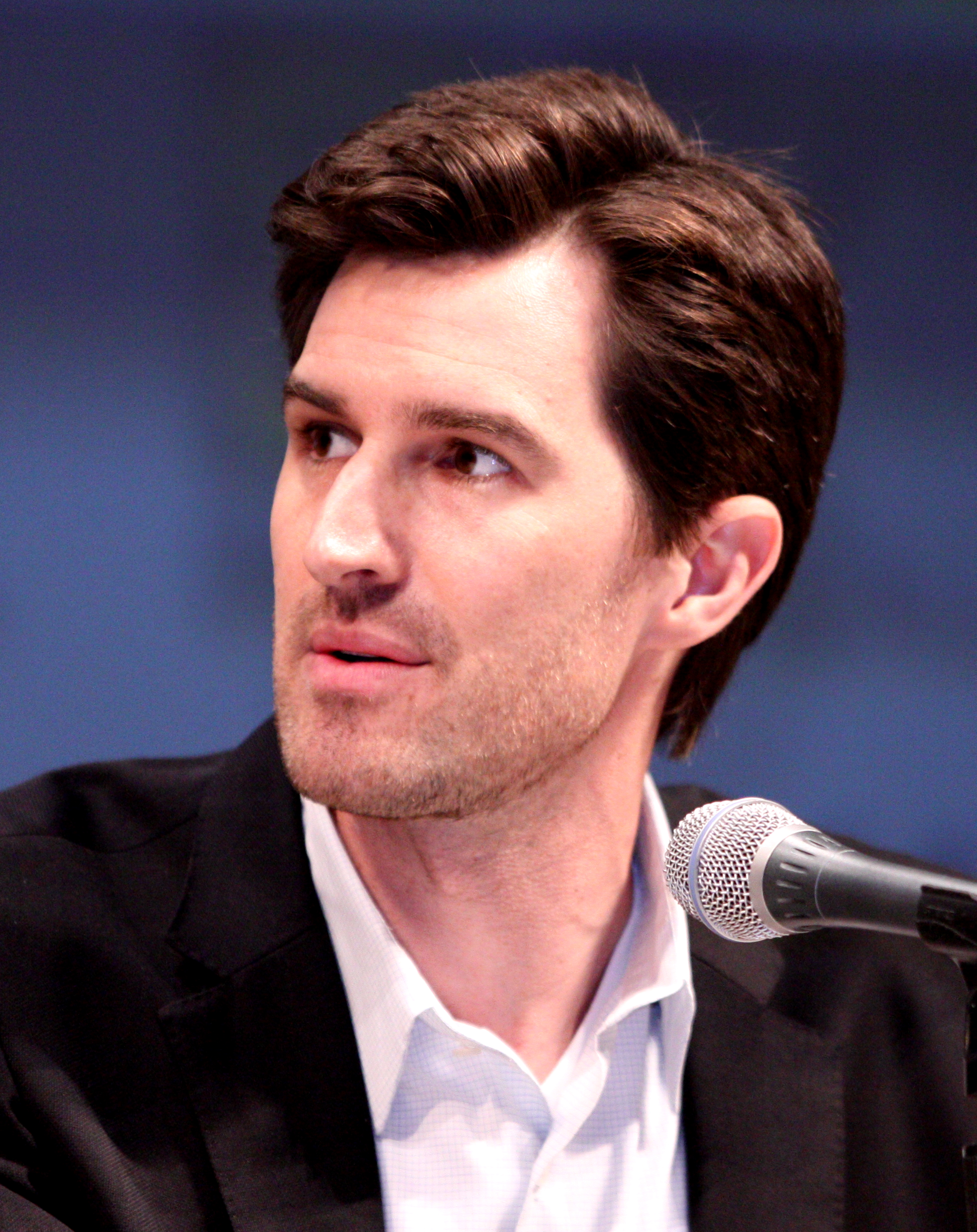
Kosinski, who sought to avoid the formula used in The Matrix, developed a prototype of the universe of Tron: Legacy in its early stages of production.

Plans for creating Tron: Legacy began to materialize in 2005, when Walt Disney Studios hired screenwriters Brian Klugman and Lee Sternthal as writers for the film. The two had recently finished writing the script for Warrior. According to Variety columnist Michael Fleming, Klugman and Sternthal felt "that the world has caught up to Lisberger's original concept." Klugman said of the precedent film: "It was remembered not only for story, but a visual style that nobody had ever used before. We are contemporizing it, taking ideas that were ahead of the curve and applying them to the present, and we feel the film has a chance to resonate to a younger audience."

In 2007, Disney began to negotiate with Joseph Kosinski to direct. Kosinski had previously directed several CGI commercials, but Tron: Legacy would mark his feature directorial debut. Kosinski admitted that at the time, he was not keen on the idea but it later grew on him as time progressed. Kosinski was involved in a meeting with Bailey, president of Walt Disney Pictures. "Disney owns the property, Tron," Bailey stated. "Do you know it? Are you interested? What would your take be? In a post-Matrix world, how do you go back to the world of Tron?" Kosinski wanted to embrace the general ambiance of the film and wished to not use the Internet as a model or use a formula emulative of The Matrix film series. As neither individual was in equal agreement on choosing a perspective to conceive the film, Kosinski asked Bailey to lend him money in order to create a conceptual prototype of the Tron: Legacy universe, which was eventually presented at the 2009 San Diego Comic-Con. "So, we went into Disney," he recalled, "and I told them, 'We can talk about this all day, but in order to really get on the same page, I need to show you what this world looks and feels like. Give me some money and let me do a small test that will give you a hint for a couple minutes of it, and see what you think.'"

A graduate of Columbia University's architecture school, Kosinski's knowledge of architecture was pivotal in conceptualizing the Tron: Legacy universe. His approach in cultivating a prototype was different from other film directors because, according to Kosinski, he came "from a design point of view"; "Some of my favorite directors come from outside of the film business, so that made my approach different from other directors, but a design background makes sense for a movie like this because the whole world has to be made from scratch." Lisberger would later state that he left the sequel to a different production team because "after thirty years I don't want to compete with myself," and to showcase how the next generation dealt with the themes contained in Tron – "If I brought my network in, it would be a little bit like one of those Clint Eastwood movies where all the old guys go to space." Lisberger added that "I dig this role of being the Obi-Wan or the Yoda on this film more than being the guy in the trenches," stating that unlike Kosinski, his age was a hindering factor – "I cannot work sixteen hours a day staring at twenty-five monitors for most of that time."

=== Themes ===
Wilde's character Quorra was modeled after Joan of Arc.

Tron: Legacy is imbued with several references to religious themes, particularly those relating to Christianity and Buddhism. Olivia Wilde's character, Quorra, was inspired/formed by the historical Catholic figure Joan of Arc. Wilde sought inspiration from her six months before production of the film commenced. She, alongside Kosinski, collaborated with the writers on editing the characters so she would contain the characteristics of Joan of Arc. Wilde assessed the characteristics of the figure: "She's this unlikely warrior, very strong but compassionate, and completely led by selflessness. Also, she thinks she's in touch with some higher power and has one foot in another world. All of these were elements of Quorra." Since she epitomizes the concept of androgyny, producers conceived Quorra from an androgynous perspective, notably giving her a short haircut.

Bridges opined that Tron: Legacy was evocative of a modern myth, adding that ideas alluding to technological advancement were prevalent throughout the film. To Cyriaque Lamar of io9, the film's approach to technology was reminiscent of a kōan. "One of the things that brought me to this film," affirmed Bridges, "was the idea of helping to create a modern-day myth to help us navigate through these technological waters [...]. I dig immediate gratification as much as anybody, but it happens so fast that if you make a decision like that, you can go far down the wrong path. Think about those plastic single-use water bottles. Where did that come from? Who decided that? You can have a couple of swigs of water [...] and those bottles don't disintegrate entirely. Microscopic animals eat the plastic, and the fish eat those, and we're all connected. It's a finite situation here."

According to screenwriter Adam Horowitz, Kosinski stated that the film's universal theme was "finding a human connection in a digital world." They followed this by "approach[ing] the world from the perspective of character, using Kevin Flynn as an organizing principle, and focus on the emotional relationship from father and son and their reconciliation, which brings profound turns in their respective individual lives."

=== Development ===
Original sequel logo, from the test footage that premiered at Comic-Con 2008

At the 2008 San Diego Comic-Con, a preliminary teaser trailer (labeled as TR2N and directed by Joseph Kosinski) was shown as a surprise to convention guests. It depicted a yellow Program engaged in a light cycle battle with a blue Program, prominently featuring Jeff Bridges reprising his role as an older Kevin Flynn. At the end of the trailer, the yellow Program showed his face, which appeared identical to Flynn's earlier program Clu (resembling the younger Flynn in Tron).

While the trailer did not confirm that a Tron sequel was in production, it indicated that Disney was serious about one. In an interview with Sci-Fi Wire, Bridges revealed that the test footage was unlikely to appear in the finished film. On July 23, 2009, Disney revealed the film's title at their panel at Comic-Con. Bridges explained that the title refers to the story's theme: "It's basically a story about a son's search for his father." They also showed a trailer similar to the one shown at Comic-Con 2009, with updated visuals. At the time, the film had just wrapped production, and they had a year of post-production ahead of them. Because none of the footage from inside the computer world was finished, they premiered concept images from the production. Art included the Recognizer, which has been updated from the original film. Concept photos were also shown of Disc Wars, which has also been revised from the original film into a 16-game tournament. The arena is set up so that the game court organically changes, and all 16 games are going on at the same time. The boards also combine in real time until the last two Disc warriors are connected. Light cycles make a return, with new designs by Daniel Simon. According to the press conference at Comic-Con 2008, a new vehicle appears called a "Light Runner," a two-seat version of the light cycle, and Kevin Flynn's own cycle, a "Second Generation Light Cycle" designed in 1989 by Flynn and is "still the fastest thing on The Grid." It incorporates some of the look of both films.

=== Casting ===
In July 2008, Jeff Bridges signed on to reprise his role from the prior film. In December 2008, Olivia Wilde and Beau Garrett were cast, while Bruce Boxleitner was revealed to be reprising his role from the original film. In January 2009, Garrett Hedlund was cast as Sam Flynn; Ryan Gosling, Chris Pine, and Michael Stahl-David were also considered for the role. In May 2009, Michael Sheen joined the cast.

=== Filming ===
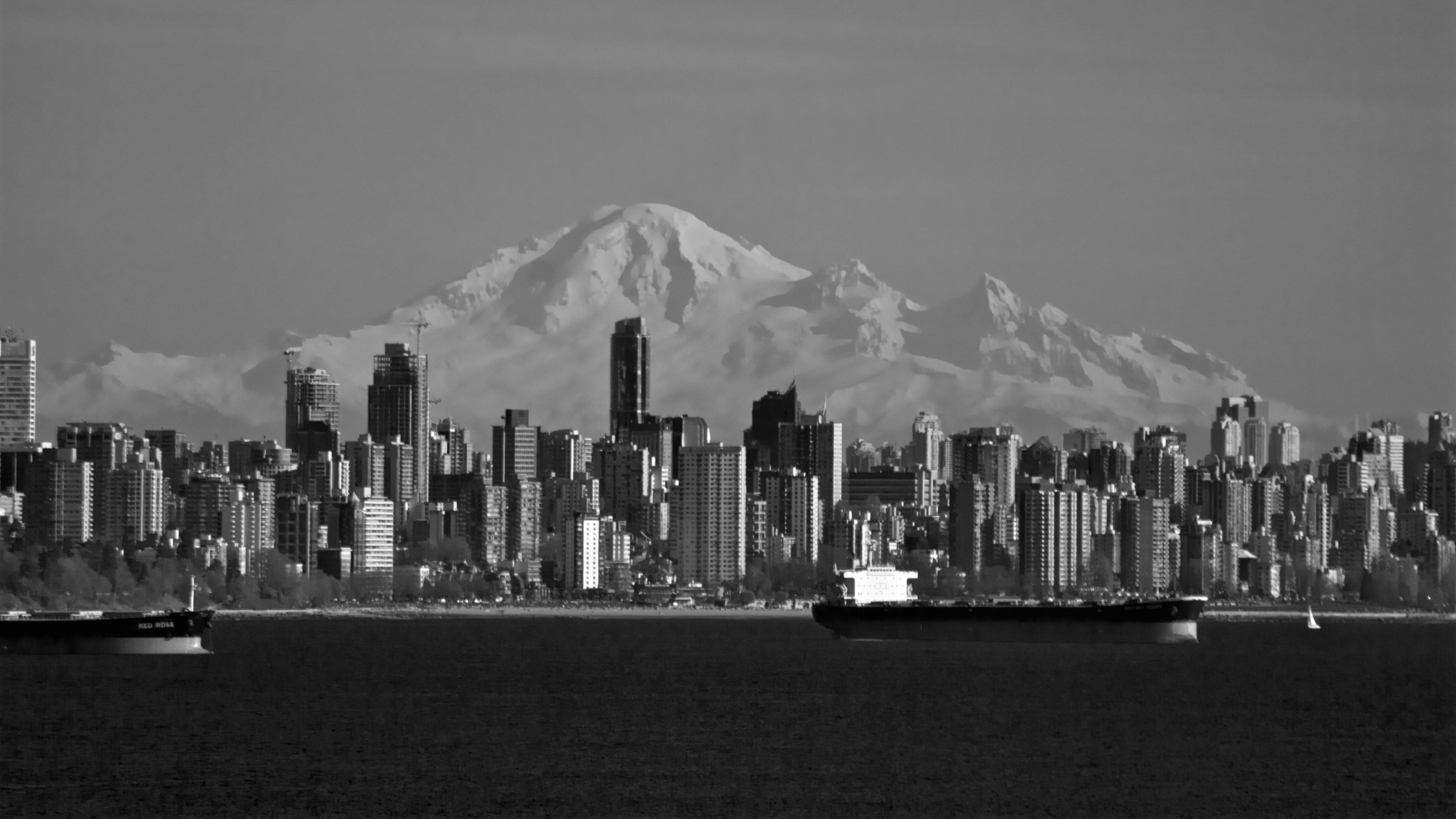
A portion of Downtown Vancouver provided for the setting of Tron: Legacy.

Principal photography took place in Vancouver, British Columbia, in April 2009, and lasted for approximately 67 days. Many filming locations were established in Downtown Vancouver and its surroundings. Stage shooting for the film took place at the Canadian Motion Picture Park studio in Burnaby, an adjacent city that forms part of Metro Vancouver. Kosinski devised and constructed twelve to fifteen of the film's sets, including Kevin Flynn's safe house, a creation he illustrated on a napkin for a visual effects test. "I wanted to build as much as possible. It was important to me that this world feel real, and anytime I could build something I did. So I hired guys that I went to architecture school with to work on the sets for this film, and hopefully people who watch the film feel like there's a certain physicality to this world that hopefully they appreciate, knowing that real architects actually put this whole thing together." The film was shot in dual camera 3D using Pace Fusion rigs like James Cameron's Avatar, but unlike the Sony F950 cameras on that film, Tron used the F35s. "The benefit of [the F35s]," according to director Kosinski, "is that it has a full 35mm sensor which gives you that beautiful cinematic shallow depth of field." The film's beginning portions were shot in 2D, while forty minutes of the film were vertically enhanced for IMAX. Digital Domain was contracted to work on the visual effects, while companies such as Prime Focus Group, DD Vancouver, and Mr. X were brought on to collaborate with producer on the post-production junctures of Tron: Legacy. Post-production wrapped on November 25, 2009.

The sequences on the Grid were shot entirely in 3D, using cameras specifically designed for it, and employed a 3D technique that combined other special effects. The real-world sequences were filmed in 2D, and eventually altered using the three-dimensional element. Bailey stated that it was a challenge shooting Tron: Legacy in 3D because the cameras were bigger and heavier, and variations needed to be taken into account. Despite these concerns, he opined that it was a "great reason to go to the movies because it's an experience you just can't recreate on an iPhone or a laptop." In some sequences, the image shows a fine mesh pattern and some blurring. That is not interference or a production fault, but indicates that that sequence is a flashback and is meant to simulate an older form of video representation technology. Stunt work on the film was designed and coordinated by 87Eleven, who also designed and trained fight sequences for 300 and Watchmen. Olivia Wilde described it as an honor to train with them.

=== Design ===
In defining his method for creating Tron: Legacy, Kosinski declared that his main objective was to "make it feel real," adding that he wanted the audience to feel like filming actually occurred in the fictional universe. For this, many physical sets were built, as Kosinski "wanted the materials to be real materials: glass, concrete, steel, so it had this kind of visceral quality." Kosinski collaborated with people who specialized in fields outside of the film industry, such as architecture and automotive design. The look of the Grid aimed for a more advanced version of the cyberspace visited by Flynn in Tron, which Lisberger described as "a virtual Galapagos, which has evolved on its own." As Bailey put it, the Grid would not have any influence from the Internet as it had turned offline from the real world in the 1980s, and "grew on its own server into something powerful and unique." Kosinski added that as the simulation became more realistic, it would try to become closer to the real world with environmental effects such as rain and wind, and production designer Darren Gilford stated that there would be a juxtaposition between the variety of texture and color of the real-world introduction in contrast with the "clean surfaces and lines" of the Grid. As the design team considered the lights a major part of the Tron look, particularly for being set in a dark world—described by effects art director Ben Procter as "dark silhouetted objects dipped in an atmosphere with clouds in-between, in a kind of Japanese landscape painting" where "the self-lighting of the objects is the main light source"—lighting was spread through every prop on the set, including the floor in Flynn's hideout. Lisberger also stated that while the original Tron "reflected the way cyberspace was," the sequel was "going to be like a modern day, like contemporary plus, in terms of how much resolution, the texturing, the feel, the style," adding that "it doesn't have that Pong Land vibe to it anymore."

The skintight suits worn by the actors were reminiscent of the outfits worn by the actors in the original film. Kosinski believed that the costumes could be made to be practical due to the computerized nature of the film, as physically illuminating each costume would be costly to the budget. Christine Bieselin Clark worked with Michael Wilkinson in designing the lighted costumes, which used electroluminescent lamps derived from a flexible polymer film and featured hexagonal patterns. The lights passed through the suit via Light Tape, a substance composed of Honeywell lamination and Sylvania phosphors. To concoct a color, a transparent 3M Vinyl film was applied onto the phosphor prior to lamination. While most of the suits were made out of foam latex, others were made from spandex, which was sprayed with balloon rubber, ultimately giving the illusion of a lean shape. The actors had to be compressed to compensate for the bulk of the electronics. In addition, Clark and Wilkinson designed over 140 background costumes. The two drew inspiration from various fashion and shoe designers when building the costumes. On the back of the suit was an illuminated disc, which consisted of 134 LED lights. It was attached to the suit via a magnet and was radio-controlled. Hedlund kept getting shocked from his sweat touching the LED lights attached to the suit while filming a fight scene. All the costumes had to be sewn in such a way that the stitches did not appear, as the design team figured that in a virtual environment the clothes would just materialize, with no need for buttons, zippers, or enclosures. According to Neville Page, the lead designer for the helmets, "The art departments communicated very well with each other to realise Joe's [...] vision. We would look over each other's shoulders to find inspiration from one another. The development of the costumes came from trying to develop the form language which came from within the film."

The majority of the suits were designed using ZBrush. A scan of an actor's body was taken, which was then encased to decipher the fabric, the location of the foam, amongst other concerns. With a computer numerical cutting (CNC) of dense foam, a small-scale output would be created to perfect fine details before initiating construction of the suit. Upon downloading the participant's body scan, the illustrations were overlaid to provide an output manufacturing element. Describing the CNC process, Chris Lavery of Clothes on Film noted that it had a tendency to elicit bubbles and striations. Clark stated: "The [...] suit is all made of a hexagon mesh which we also printed and made the fabric from 3D files. This would go onto the hard form; it would go inside the mould which was silicon matrix. We would put those together and then inject foam into the negative space. The wiring harness is embedded into the mould and you get a torso. We then paint it and that's your finished suit."

=== Sound and visual effects ===
The likeness of a 35-year-old Jeff Bridges was taken from the 1984 film Against All Odds as opposed to the original Tron.

Crowd effects for the gaming arena were recorded at the 2010 San Diego Comic-Con. During one of the Tron: Legacy panels, the crowd was given instructions via a large video screen while techs from Skywalker Sound recorded the performance. The audience performed chants and stomping effects similar to what is heard in modern sports arenas.

It took two years and ten companies to create the 1,565 visual effects shots of Tron: Legacy. The majority of the effects were done by Digital Domain, who created 882 shots under supervisor Eric Barba. The production team blended several special effect techniques, such as chroma keying, to allow more freedom in creating effects. Similar to Tron, this approach was seen as pushing the boundaries of modern technology. "I was going more on instinct rather than experience," Kosinski remarked. Although he had previously used the technology in producing advertisements, this was the first time Kosinski used it on a large scale simultaneously. Darren Gilford was approached as the production designer, while David Levy was hired as a concept artist. Levy translated Kosinski's ideas into drawings and other visual designs. "Joe's vision evolved the visuals of the first film," he stated. "He wanted the Grid to feel like reality, but with a twist." An estimated twenty to twenty-five artists from the art department developed concepts of the Tron: Legacy universe, which varied from real-world locations to fully digital sets. Gilford suggested that there were between sixty and seventy settings in the film, split into fifteen fully constructed sets with varying levels of computer-generated landscapes.

Rather than using makeup techniques, such as those used in A Beautiful Mind, to give Jeff Bridges a younger appearance, the character of Clu was completely computer-generated. To show that this version of Clu was created some time after the events of the original film, the visual effects artists based his appearance on how Bridges looked in Against All Odds, released two years after Tron. The effects team hired makeup artist Rick Baker to construct a molded likeness of a younger Bridges head to serve as their basis for their CG work. However, they scrapped the mold because they wished for it to be more youthful. There was no time to make another mold, so the team reconstructed it digitally. On-set, first Bridges would perform, being then followed by actor double John Reardon who would mimic his actions. Reardon's head was replaced in post-production with the digitally de-aged version of the young Bridges. Barba – who was involved in a similar experience for The Curious Case of Benjamin Button — stated that they used four microcameras with infrared sensors to capture all 134 dots on Bridges face that would be the basis of the facial movements, a similar process that was used in Avatar. It took over two years to not only create the likeness of Clu, but also the character's movements (such as muscle movement). Bridges called the experience surreal and said it was "Just like the first Tron, but for real!" Bruce Boxleitner, who plays the title character of Tron, also appears de-aged in flashbacks; his real world character of Alan Bradley appears as Boxleitner's natural age.

== Soundtrack ==
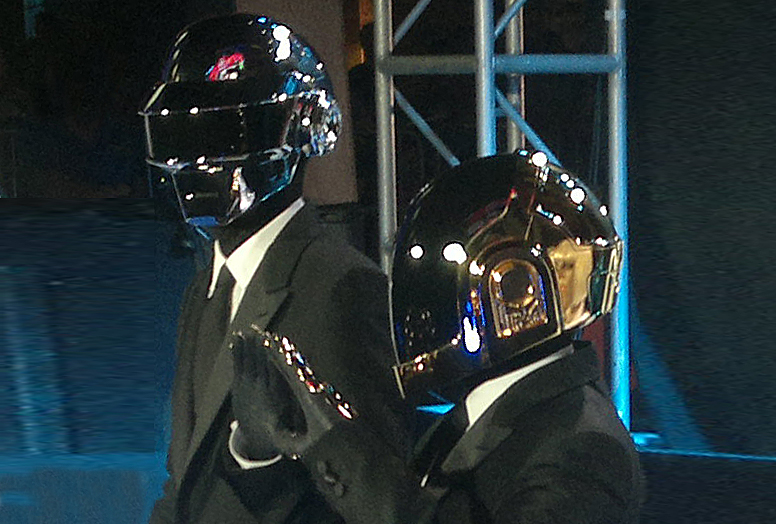
For the film's soundtrack, French electronic duo Daft Punk went away from an exclusively electronic sound and incorporated some orchestral elements.

The French electronic duo Daft Punk composed the film score of Tron: Legacy, which features over 30 tracks. The score was arranged and orchestrated by Joseph Trapanese. Jason Bentley served as the film's music supervisor. Director Joseph Kosinski referred to the score as a mixture of orchestral and electronic elements. An electronic music fan, Kosinski stated that to replicate the innovative electronic Tron score by Wendy Carlos "rather than going with a traditional film composer, I wanted to try something fresh and different," adding that "there was a lot of interest from different electronic bands that I follow to work on the film" but he eventually picked Daft Punk. Kosinski added that he knew the band was "more than just dance music guys" for side projects such as their film Electroma. The duo were first contacted by producers in 2007, when Tron: Legacy was still in the early stages of production. Since they were touring at the time, producers were unsuccessful in contacting the group. They were approached again by Kosinski and eventually agreed to take part in the film a year later. Kosinski added that Daft Punk were huge Tron fans, and that his meeting with them "was almost like they were interviewing me to make sure that I was going to hold up to the Tron legacy."

The duo started composing the soundtrack before production began, and it is a notable departure from the duo's previous works, as Daft Punk placed higher emphasis on orchestral elements rather than relying solely on synthesizers. "Synths are a very low level of artificial intelligence," explained member Guy-Manuel de Homem-Christo, "whereas you have a Stradivarius that will live for a thousand years. We knew from the start that there was no way that we were going to do this film score with two synthesizers and a drum machine."

"Derezzed" was released as its sole single from the soundtrack. The album was released by Walt Disney Records on December 3, 2010, and sold 71,000 copies in its first week in the United States. Peaking at number six on the Billboard 200, it eventually acquired a platinum certification by the Recording Industry Association of America, denoting shipments of 1,000,000 copies. A remix album for the soundtrack, titled Tron: Legacy Reconfigured, became available on April 5, 2011 to coincide with the film's home media release.

== Marketing ==
=== Marketing and promotions ===
On July 21, 2009, several film-related websites reported receiving, by mail, a pair of "Flynn's Arcade" tokens along with a flash drive. Its content was an animated GIF that showed CSS code lines. Four of them were put together, and part of the code was cracked, revealing the URL to flynnlives.com, a fictitious site maintained by activists who believe Kevin Flynn is alive, even though he has been missing since 1989. Clicking on a tiny spider in the lower section of the main page led to a countdown clock that hit zero on July 23, 2009, 9:30 pm PDT. Within the Terms of Use Section, an address was found. It lies in San Diego, California, US, near the city's convention center, where Comic-Con 2009 took place, and where some footage and information on the sequel were released. Flynn's Arcade was reopened at that location, with several Space Paranoids arcade machines and a variety of '80s video games. A full-size light cycle from the new film was on display.

A ninth viral site, homeoftron.com, was found. It portrays some of the history of Flynn's Arcade as well as a fan memoir section. On December 19, 2009, a new poster was revealed, along with the second still from the film. Banners promoting the film paved the way to the 2010 Comic-Con convention center, making this a record third appearance for the film at the annual event.

Disney also partnered with both Coke Zero and Norelco on Tron: Legacy. Disney's subsidiary Marvel Comics had special covers of their superheroes in Tron garb, and Nokia had trailers for the film preloaded on Nokia N8 phones while doing a promotion to attend the film's London premiere. While Sam picks up a can of Coors in the film, it was not product placement, with the beer appearing because Kosinski "just liked the color and thought it would look good on screen."

=== Attractions ===
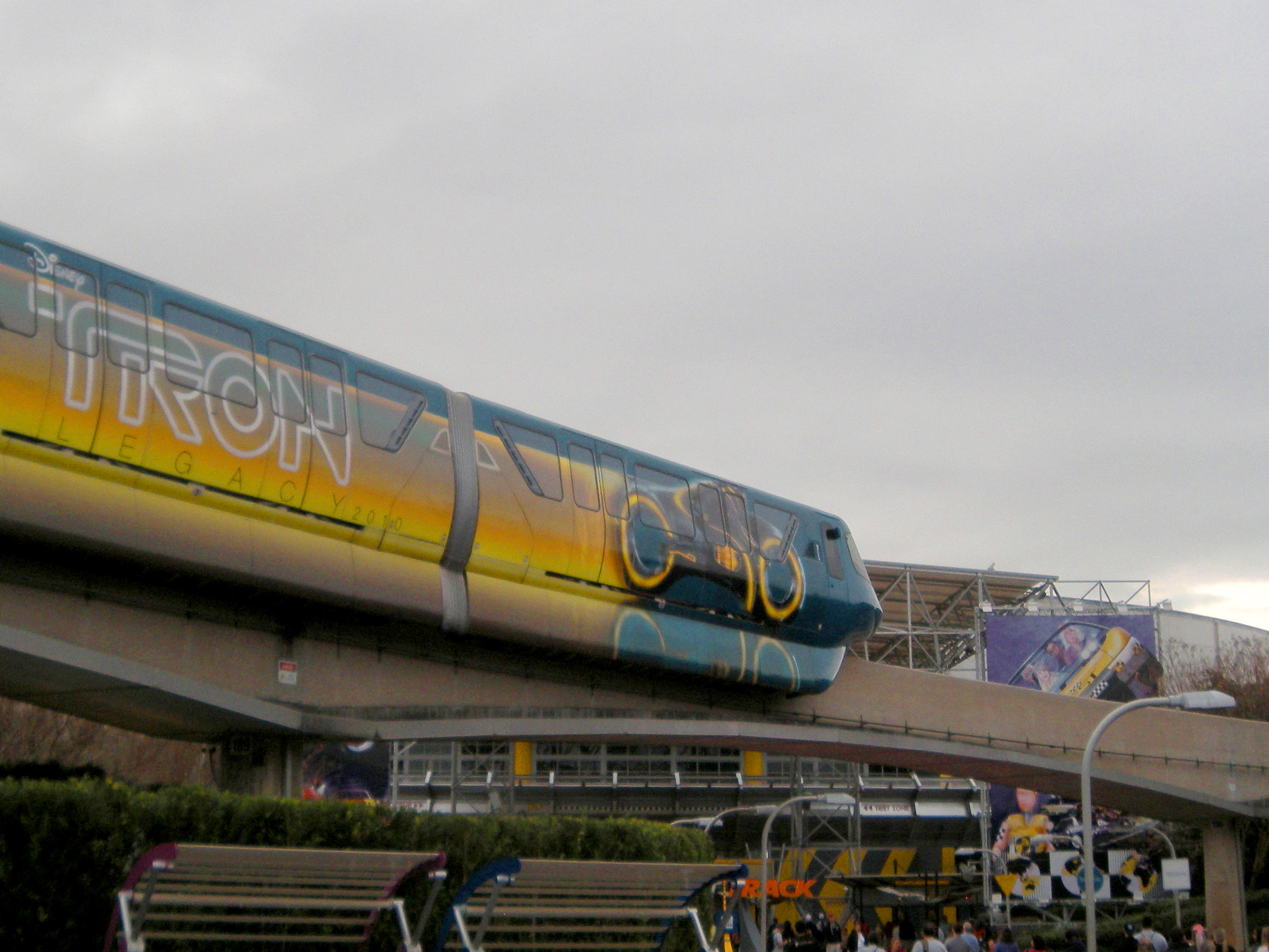
A Tron-themed monorail passing through Epcot at the Walt Disney World Resort

At the Walt Disney World Resort in Florida, one monorail train was decorated with special artwork depicting light cycles with trailing beams of light, along with the film's logo. This Tron-themed monorail, formerly the "Coral" monorail, was renamed the "Tronorail" and unveiled in March 2010. At the Disneyland Resort in California, a nighttime dance party named "ElecTRONica" premiered on October 8, 2010, and was set to close in May 2011, but it was extended until April 2012 due to positive guest response, in Hollywood Land at Disney California Adventure Park. Winners of America's Best Dance Crew, Poreotics, performed at ElecTRONica. As part of ElecTRONica, a sneak peek with scenes from the film is shown in 3D with additional in-theater effects in the Muppet*Vision 3D theater.

On October 29, 2010, the nighttime show World of Color at Disney California Adventure Park began soft-openings after its second show of a Tron: Legacy-themed encore using a Daft Punk music piece titled "The Game Has Changed" from the film soundtrack, using new effects and projections on Paradise Pier attractions. The encore officially premiered on November 1, 2010. On December 12, 2010, the show Extreme Makeover: Home Edition, as part of a house rebuild, constructed a Tron: Legacy-themed bedroom for one of the occupants' young boys. The black painted room not only consisted of life-sized Tron city graphics, but also glowing blue line graphics on the walls, floor and furniture, a desk with glowing red-lit Recognizers for the legs and a Tron suit-inspired desk chair, a light cycle-shaped chair with blue lighting accents, a projection mural system that projected Tron imagery on a glass wall partition, a laptop computer, a flat panel television, several Tron: Legacy action figures, a daybed in black and shimmering dark blue and blue overhead lit panels.

Disney was involved with the Ice Hotel in Jukkasjärvi, Sweden through association with designers Ian Douglas-Jones at I-N-D-J and Ben Rousseau to create "The Legacy of the River," a high-tech suite inspired by Tron: Legacy. The suite uses electroluminescent wire to capture the art style of the film. It consists of over 60 square meters of 100mm thick ice equating to approximately six tons. 160 linear meters of electroluminescent wire were routed out, sandwiched and then glued with powdered snow and water to create complex geometric forms. The Ice Hotel is expected to get 60,000 visitors for the season, which lasts December 2010 through April 2011. On November 19, 2010, the Tron: Legacy Pop Up Shop opened at Royal-T Cafe and Art Space in Culver City, California. The shop featured many of the collaborative products created as tie-ins with the film from brands such as Oakley, Hurley and Adidas. The space was decorated in theme and the adjacent cafe had a tie in menu with Tron-inspired dishes. The shop remained open until December 23, 2010.

Following the release of the film, the TRON Lightcycle Power Run attraction, based on the film, opened at Shanghai Disneyland and Magic Kingdom in 2016 and 2023, respectively.

=== Merchandising ===
Electronics and toy lines inspired by the film were released during late 2010. A line of Tron-inspired jewelry, shoes and apparel was also released, and Disney created a pop-up store to sell them in Culver City. Custom Tron branded gaming controllers have been released for Xbox 360, PlayStation 3 and Wii.

A tie-in video game, entitled Tron: Evolution, was released on November 25, 2010. The story takes place between the original film and Tron: Legacy. Teaser trailers were released in November 2009, while a longer trailer was shown during the Spike Video Game Awards on December 12, 2009. There were also two games released for the iOS devices (iPhone, iPod, and iPad) as tie-ins to the films. Disney commissioned N-Space to develop a series of multiplayer games based on Tron: Legacy for the Wii console. IGN reviewed the PlayStation 3 version of the game but gave it only a "passable" 6 out of 10. A tie-in 128-page graphic novel Tron: Betrayal was released by Disney Press on November 16, 2010. It includes an 11-page retelling of the original Tron story, in addition to a story taking place between the original film and Tron: Legacy. IGN reviewed the comic and gave it a "passable" score of 6.5 out of 10.

== Release ==
=== Premiere and theaters ===
On October 28, 2010, a 23-minute preview of the film was screened on many IMAX theaters all over the world, (presented by ASUS). The tickets for this event were sold out within an hour on October 8. Stand-by tickets for the event were also sold shortly before the presentation started. Original merchandise from the film was also available for sale. Announced through the official Tron Facebook page, the red carpet premiere of the film was broadcast live on the Internet. Tron: Legacy was released in theaters on December 17, 2010, in the United States and United Kingdom. The film was originally set to be released in the UK on December 26, 2010, but was brought forward due to high demand. The film was presented in IMAX 3D and Disney Digital 3D. The film was also released with D-BOX motion code in select theaters and released in 50 Iosono-enhanced cinemas, creating "3D sound."

On December 10, 2010, in Toronto, Ontario, Canada, a special premiere was hosted by George Stroumboulopoulos organised through Twitter, open to the first 100 people who showed up at the CN Tower. After the film ended the tower was lit up blue to mirror The Grid. On December 13, 2010, in select cities all over the United States, a free screening of the entire film in 3D was available to individuals on a first-come, first-served basis. Free "Flynn Lives" pins were handed out to the attendees. The announcement of the free screenings was made on the official Flynn Lives Facebook page. On January 21, 2011, the German designer Michael Michalsky hosted the German premiere of the film at his cultural event StyleNite during Berlin Fashion Week.

=== Home media release ===
Tron: Legacy was released by Walt Disney Studios Home Entertainment on Blu-ray Disc, DVD, and digital download in North America on April 5, 2011. Tron: Legacy was available stand-alone as a single-disc DVD, a two-disc DVD and Blu-ray combo pack, and a four-disc box set adding a Blu-ray 3D and a digital copy. A five-disc box set featuring both Tron films was also released, entitled The Ultimate Tron Experience, having a collectible packaging resembling an identity disk. The digital download of Tron: Legacy was available in both high definition or standard definition, including versions with or without the digital extras.

A short film sequel to the film, Tron: The Next Day, as well as a preview of the 19-episode animated series Tron: Uprising, is included in all versions of the home media release. Tron: Legacy was the second Walt Disney Studios Home Entertainment release that included Disney Second Screen, a feature accessible via a computer or iPad app download that provides additional content as the user views the film. Forty minutes of the film were shot in 2.39:1 and then vertically enhanced for IMAX. These scenes are presented in 1.78:1 in a similar way to the Blu-ray release of The Dark Knight.

In August 2025, it was announced during the Destination D23 showcase that Tron: Legacy would be released as a 4K Ultra HD Steelbook on September 16. Disney+ announced later in the month that the Tron films were available to stream in 4K.

== Reception ==
=== Box office ===
Leading up to the release, various commercial analysts predicted that Tron: Legacy would gross $40–$50 million during its opening weekend, a figure that Los Angeles Times commentator Ben Fritz wrote would be "solid but not spectacular." Although the studio hoped to attract a broad audience, the film primarily appealed to men: "Women appear to be more hesitant about the science-fiction sequel," wrote Fritz. Jay Fernandez of The Hollywood Reporter felt that the disproportionate audience would be problematic for the film's long term box office prospects. Writing for Box Office Mojo, Brandon Gray attributed pre-release hype to "unwarranted blockbuster expectations from fanboys," given the original Tron was considered "one of Disney's great follies of the 1980s" and the film's cult fandom "amounted to a niche."

In North America, the film earned $43.6 million during the course of its opening weekend. On its opening day, it grossed $17.6 million, including $3.6 million during midnight showings from 2,000 theaters, 29% of which were IMAX screenings, and went on to claim the top spot for the weekend, ahead of Yogi Bear and How Do You Know, making $44 million. Tron: Legacy grossed roughly $68 million during its first week, and surpassed $100 million on its 12th day in release.

Outside North America, Tron: Legacy grossed $23 million on its opening weekend, averaging $6,000 per theater. According to Disney, 65% of foreign grosses originated from five key markets; Japan, Australia, Brazil, United Kingdom, and Spain. The film performed the best in Japan, where it took $4.7 million from 350 theaters. Australia ($3.4 million), the United Kingdom ($3.2 million), Brazil ($1.9 million), and Spain ($1.9 million). By the following week, Tron: Legacy obtained $65.5 million from foreign markets, bringing total grosses to $153.8 million. At the end of its theatrical run, Tron: Legacy had grossed $409.9 million; $172.1 million in North America, and $237.8 million in other countries.

=== Critical reception ===
Tron: Legacy, a sequel made 28 years after the original but with the same actor, is true to the first film: It also can't be understood, but looks great. Both films, made so many years apart, can fairly lay claim to being state of the art.

— Roger Ebert

On the review aggregator website Rotten Tomatoes, 51% of 249 critics' reviews are positive, with an average rating of 5.8/10. The website's consensus reads: "Tron Legacy boasts dazzling visuals, but its human characters and story get lost amidst its state-of-the-art production design." Metacritic, which uses a weighted average, assigned the film a score of 49 out of 100, based on 40 critics, indicating "mixed or average" reviews. Audiences polled by CinemaScore gave the film an average grade of "B+" on an A+ to F scale.

The visual effects were cited as the central highlight of the film. In his three out of four star review, Roger Ebert of the Chicago Sun-Times felt that the environment was aesthetically pleasing, and added that its score displayed an "electronic force" that complemented the visuals. Rolling Stone columnist Peter Travers echoed these sentiments, concluding that the effects were of an "award-caliber." J. Hoberman of The Village Voice noted that while it was extensively enhanced, Tron: Legacy retained the streamlined visuals that were seen in its predecessor. Variety's Peter DeBarge affirmed that the visuals and the accompanied "cutting-edge" score made for a "stunning virtual ride." To Nick de Semlyen of Empire, "This is a movie of astonishing high-end gloss, fused to a pounding Daft Punk soundtrack, populated with sleek sirens and chiselled hunks, boasting electroluminescent landscapes to make Blu-ray players weep." Some critics were not as impressed with the film's special effects. Manohla Dargis of The New York Times wrote that despite its occasional notability, the film's "vibrating kaleidoscopic colors that gave the first movie its visual punch have been replaced by a monotonous palette of glassy black and blue and sunbursts of orange and yellow." Though declaring that Tron: Legacy was "eye-popping," San Francisco Chronicle's Amy Biancolli conceded that the special effects were "spectacular"—albeit cheesy. A columnist for The Wall Street Journal, Joe Morgenstern denounced the producers' emphasis on technological advancements, which he felt could have been used for other means such as drama.

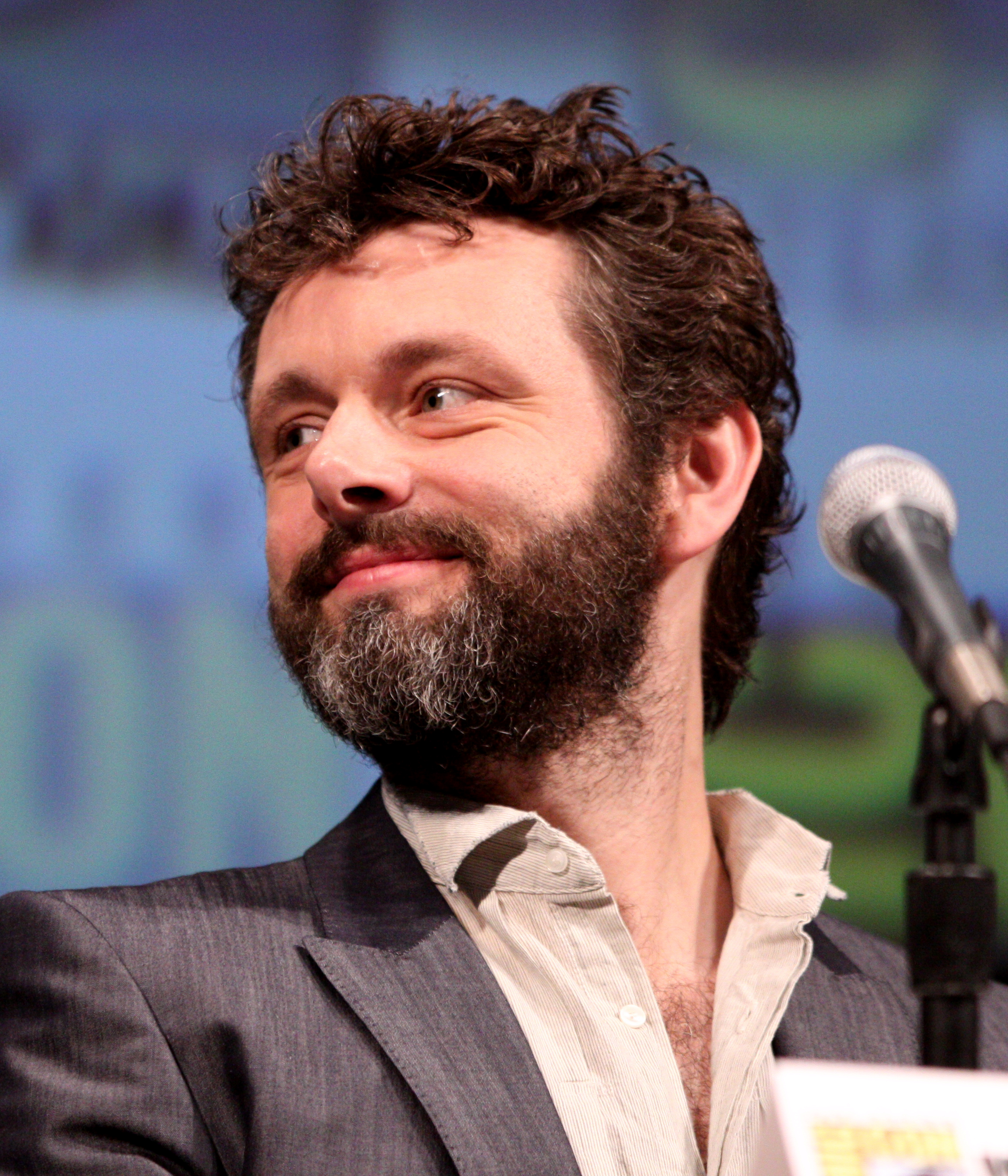
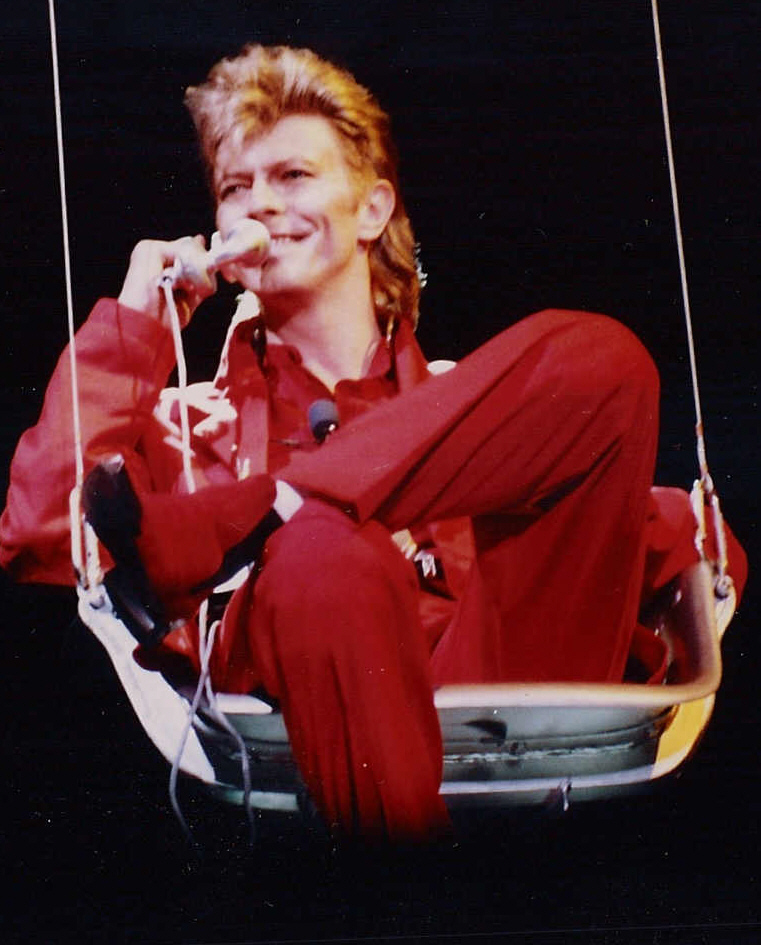
Michael Sheen's (left) performance was lauded by commentators, who found similarities between his character and English musician David Bowie (right).

The performances of various cast members were frequently mentioned in the critiques. Michael Sheen's portrayal of Castor was particularly acclaimed by commentators, who—because of his flamboyance—drew parallels to pop-rock icon David Bowie, as well as fictional characters such as A Clockwork Orange lead character Alex. Dargis, Debruge, Puig, and Carrie Rickey of The Philadelphia Inquirer were among the journalists to praise his acting: Dargis ascribed Sheen's exceptional performance to a comparatively "uninteresting" cast. To Philadelphia Daily News film critic Gary Thompson, the film became humorous with the scenes involving Castor. Star Tribune critic Colin Covert believed that Sheen's campy antics were the "too brief" highlights of Tron: Legacy. With other cast members—particularly Garrett Hedlund, Olivia Wilde, and Jeff Bridges—commentary reflected diverse attitudes. The film received "a little boost from" Wilde, according to Rickey. The Boston Globe's Wesley Morris called Hedlund a "dud stud"; "None of what he sees impresses," he elaborated. "The feeling is mutual. At an alleged cost of $200 million, that's some yawn. If he can't be thrilled, why should we?" To Salon commentator Andrew O'Hehir, even Bridges—an individual he regarded as "one of America's most beloved and distinctive" actors—was "weird and complicated" rather than being the "sentimental and alluring" portrayer in the original Tron.

Critics were divided with the character development and the storylines in Tron: Legacy. Writing for The New Yorker, Bruce Jones commented that the audience did not connect with the characters, as they were lacking emotion and substance. "Disney may be looking for a merchandising bonanza with this long-gestating sequel to the groundbreaking 1982 film," remarked Jones, "but someone in the corporate offices forgot to add any human interest to its action-heavy script." Likewise, USA Today journalist Claudia Puig found Tron: Legacy to resonate with "nonsensical" and "unimaginative, even obfuscating" dialogue, and that "most of the story just doesn't scan." As Dana Stevens from Slate summed up, "Tron: Legacy is the kind of sensory-onslaught blockbuster that tends to put me to sleep, the way babies will nap to block out overwhelming stimuli. I confess I may have snoozed through one or two climactic battles only to be startled awake by an incoming neon Frisbee." Although he proclaimed the plot of Tron: Legacy and its predecessor to be spotty, Ian Buckwater of NPR was lenient on the latter film due to its youth-friendly nature. In contrast to negative responses, Michelle Alexander of Eclipse adored the plot of Tron: Legacy, a reaction that was paralleled by Rossiter Drake from 7x7, who wrote that it was "buoyed" by its "sometimes convoluted, yet hard to resist" story. Metro's Larushka Ivan-Zadeh complained about the underdeveloped plot, saying "In 2010, issues surrounding the immersive nature of gaming and all-consuming power of modern technology are more pertinent than ever, so it's frustrating the script does nothing with them." However, she conceded that "it's the best 3D flick since Avatar and a super-groovy soundtrack by Daft Punk nonetheless makes for an awesome watch."

=== Accolades ===
Tron: Legacy received an award for Best Original Score from the Austin Film Critics Association. The film was also nominated for "Excellence in Production Design for a Fantasy Film" by the Art Directors Guild, and for Sound Editing by the Academy of Motion Picture Arts and Sciences. The film made the final shortlist for the Academy Award for Best Visual Effects, although it did not receive a nomination.

Award	Date	Recipient(s)	Category	Result
Academy Awards	February 27, 2011	Gwendolyn Yates Whittle and Addison Teague	Best Sound Editing	Nominated
Art Directors Guild	February 5, 2011	Darren Gilford	Excellence in Production Design for a Fantasy Film	Nominated
Austin Film Critics Association	December 22, 2010	Daft Punk	Best Original Score	Won
Costume Designers Guild	February 22, 2011	Michael Wilkinson and Christine Bieselin Clark	Excellence in Fantasy Film	Nominated
Grammy Awards	February 12, 2012	Daft Punk	Best Score Soundtrack Album for Visual Media	Nominated
International Film Music Critics Association	March 8, 2011	Daft Punk	Best Original Score for a Fantasy/Science Fiction/Horror Film	Nominated
Las Vegas Film Critics Society	December 16, 2010	Daft Punk	Best Original Score	Nominated
Las Vegas Film Critics Society	December 16, 2010	Tron: Legacy	Best Visual Effects	Nominated
MTV Movie Awards	June 5, 2011	Olivia Wilde	Best Breakout Star	Nominated
MTV Movie Awards	June 5, 2011	Garrett Hedlund	Best Breakthrough Male Performance	Nominated
Saturn Awards	June 23, 2011	Tron: Legacy	Best Science Fiction Film	Nominated
Saturn Awards	June 23, 2011	Jeff Bridges	Best Actor	Won
Saturn Awards	June 23, 2011	Garrett Hedlund	Best Supporting Actor	Nominated
Saturn Awards	June 23, 2011	Daft Punk	Best Music	Nominated
Saturn Awards	June 23, 2011	Michael Wilkinson	Best Costume	Nominated
Saturn Awards	June 23, 2011	Darren Gilford	Best Production Design	Won
Saturn Awards	June 23, 2011	Eric Barba, Steve Preeg, Karl Denham and Nikos Kalaitzidis	Best Special Effects	Nominated
Teen Choice Awards	June 5, 2011	Olivia Wilde	Breakout Female	Nominated
Visual Effects Society Awards	February 19, 2011	Eric Barba, Lisa Beroud, Steve Gaub and Steve Preeg	Outstanding Visual Effects in a Visual Effects Driven Feature Motion Picture	Nominated
Visual Effects Society Awards	February 19, 2011	Jonathan Litt, Juan S. Gomez, Kevin Sears and Sonja Burchard for the Disc Game	Outstanding Created Environment in a Live Action Feature Motion Picture	Nominated
Visual Effects Society Awards	February 19, 2011	Paul Lambert, Sonja Burchard, Kym Olsen and Sarahjane Javelo Chase	Outstanding Compositing in a Feature Motion Picture	Nominated

== In other media ==
=== Manga ===
A manga version of Tron: Legacy was released by Earth Star Entertainment in Japan on June 30, 2011.

=== Video games and pinball ===
Tron: Legacy was adapted as a location named "The Grid" in the 2012 Nintendo 3DS game Kingdom Hearts 3D: Dream Drop Distance and the later HD remastered version in Kingdom Hearts HD 2.8 Final Chapter Prologue. In 2011, Stern Pinball released Tron: Legacy the pinball machine.

=== Television ===
Tron: Uprising, an animated television series, premiered on June 7, 2012, on the Disney XD network across the United States. Tron: Legacy's writers Adam Horowitz and Eddie Kitsis revealed that the series tells the story of what happened in the Grid in between the films. Bruce Boxleitner and Olivia Wilde reprise their roles as Tron and Quorra from Tron: Legacy, while Elijah Wood, Lance Henriksen, Mandy Moore, Emmanuelle Chriqui, Paul Reubens, and Nate Corddry voice new characters.

== Sequel ==
Lisberger stated on October 28, 2010, before the film's release, that a sequel was in planning and that Adam Horowitz and Edward Kitsis, screenwriters for Tron: Legacy, were in the early stages of producing a script for the new film. In March 2015, it was revealed that Disney had green-lit the third film with Hedlund reprising his role as Sam and Kosinski returning to direct the sequel. Wilde was revealed in April to be returning as Quorra. Filming was expected to start in Vancouver in October 2015. In May 2015, it was reported that Walt Disney Studios had chosen not to continue with a third installment, Hedlund later explained that the box office failure of Tomorrowland right before the third Tron would have begun filming led Disney to cancel the project.

In 2017 Kosinski revealed that Tron 3 had not been scrapped, instead saying it was in "cryogenic freeze." A few days later, it was reported that Jared Leto was attached to portray a new character named Ares in the sequel. Disney had not officially confirmed that the project was in development.

In June 2020, Disney confirmed that a third Tron film was being actively worked on, a script had been written and they were looking for a director, though was hopeful that Kosinski would return. In March 2022, Leto confirmed that the film was still happening. In August 2024, Nine Inch Nails was announced to be providing the score for the film. The film, Tron: Ares, was released on October 10, 2025.
