= Tron: Legacy (soundtrack) =

Tron: Legacy (Original Motion Picture Soundtrack)
- Album cover

Soundtrack album by Daft Punk
- Released: December 3, 2010
- Recorded: 2008–2010
- Studios: AIR (London, UK)
- Genres: Film score; orchestra; synthesizer music; electronic
- Length: 58:44
- Label: Walt Disney
- Producers: Thomas Bangalter; Guy-Manuel de Homem-Christo; Sean Bailey; Joseph Kosinski; Mitchell Leib

Daft Punk chronology
Alive 2007 (2007)	Tron: Legacy (2010)	Tron: Legacy Reconfigured (2011)

Singles from Tron: Legacy
- 1. "Derezzed" Released: December 8, 2010

Tron: Legacy (Original Motion Picture Soundtrack) is the soundtrack album to the 2010 film of the same name, with twenty-two tracks featuring music by French electronic music duo Daft Punk. The first film score written by Daft Punk, the music was composed and produced by Thomas Bangalter and Guy-Manuel de Homem-Christo, arranged and orchestrated by Joseph Trapanese, and conducted by Gavin Greenaway.

Walt Disney Records released the album on December 3, 2010, and has since released several editions of the soundtrack with an additional nine tracks since then. The album also includes "Derezzed", which was released as a single on December 8.

Daft Punk's score received generally positive reviews, receiving praise for its interpolation of orchestral and electronic music. Daft Punk received a nomination for the Grammy Award for Best Score Soundtrack for Visual Media for the score. The album debuted at number 10 on the Billboard 200 chart, peaking at number 4 on the aforementioned chart by its fifth week of release. The album has been certified Platinum by the Recording Industry Association of America.

== Background ==
Tron: Legacy director Joseph Kosinski and music supervisor Jason Bentley approached Daft Punk and requested that the duo compose the film score. When asked why he wished to work with the duo, Kosinski replied, "How could you not at least go to those guys?" The producers initially attempted to reach Daft Punk in 2007, but the duo had been unavailable due to their Alive 2006/2007 tour. Thomas Bangalter of Daft Punk had previously produced the soundtrack to Gaspar Noé's 2002 film Irréversible. Noé had asked Bangalter to compose the soundtrack to the film Enter the Void, but Bangalter was working on Tron: Legacy at the time and instead served as sound effects director. After agreeing to score the film, Daft Punk worked exclusively on the score for nineteen months, putting off all other projects, as well as consulting with film composers Hans Zimmer, Alexandre Desplat, John Powell, and Christophe Beck. The music was written at Henson Recording Studios.

The score of Tron: Legacy features an 85-piece orchestra, recorded at AIR Lyndhurst Studios in London. Kosinski stated that the score is intended to be a mixture of orchestral and electronic music. Daft Punk's score was arranged and orchestrated by Joseph Trapanese, who stated he is a fan of Daft Punk as a duo and as solo artists. The band collaborated with him for two years on the score, from pre-production to completion. The orchestra was conducted by Gavin Greenaway. Trapanese cited the collaboration between the different genres to work out well in the end, stating:

It seems complicated at the end of the day, but it's actually quite simple. I was locked in a room with robots for almost two years and it was simply a lot of hard work. We were just together working throughout the whole process and there was never a point where the orchestra was not in their minds and the electronics were not in my mind. It was a continual translation between the two worlds and hopefully we put something together that will be something different because of that.

In an interview regarding the Tron: Legacy score, Guy-Manuel de Homem-Christo noted that "Synths are a very low level of artificial intelligence, whereas you have a Stradivarius that will live for a thousand years. We knew from the start that there was no way we were going to do this film score with two synthesizers and a drum machine." Daft Punk cited Wendy Carlos, the composer of the original Tron film, as well as Max Steiner, Bernard Herrmann, John Carpenter, Vangelis, Philip Glass, and Maurice Jarre as inspirations for the soundtrack. Homem-Christo also stated that Tron was a strong influence on him as a child. "Maybe I only saw it two or three times in my entire life, but the feel of it is strong even now, that I think the imprint of the first [film] will not be erased by the new one. It has a real visionary quality to it." Bangalter recalled that he had composed heroic themes for the protagonists, while Homem-Christo had written the darker musical cues. Homem-Christo concluded that Tron: Legacy "was cut to the music. Usually, composers come in at the end when everything is done."

The song "Computerized" featuring Jay-Z surfaced online in 2014, almost a half decade after the film was released. It tells a cautionary tale about relying too much on technology, with a robotic voice singing "Everyone will be computerized" in the chorus. Jay-Z takes on the role of a Luddite in the lyrics, complaining about holding conversations over text messages and having a "broken heart on the email" and "an iTouch but I can't feel". Later, he raps: "Somebody tell me what's real / I don't know how I feel." "Computerized" was originally intended to be a single to appear in and promote Tron: Legacy, but was discarded after concerns of the lyrical content being too grounded to fit the fantastical setting of the film. Portions of the score appear in the song's instrumentation.

== Promotion ==
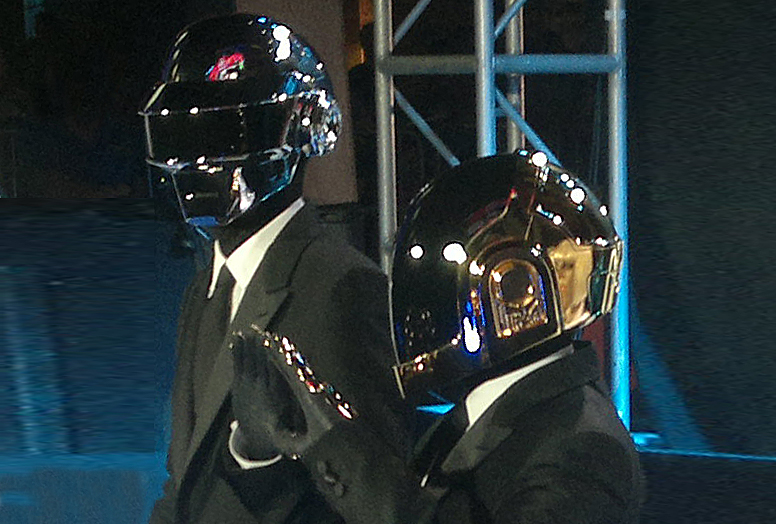
Daft Punk attending the global film premiere of Tron: Legacy

The first theatrical trailer for Tron: Legacy featured the track "The Game Has Changed". A "special presentation" trailer featuring Daft Punk and their track "Derezzed" was released online on October 26, 2010. The official music video for "Derezzed" was released online on December 7, 2010. The video features Daft Punk playing an old arcade game in Flynn's Arcade, and an appearance by Tron: Legacy cast member Olivia Wilde. The video was later included as a bonus feature on the DVD and Blu-ray releases of Tron: Legacy.

A deluxe edition of the album was made available from the official Tron: Legacy soundtrack website that includes a poster of Daft Punk as they appear in the film. In regions outside the United States, a two-disc special edition featuring the bonus tracks "ENCOM Part I", "ENCOM Part II", "Round One", "Castor", and "Reflections" was made available for a limited time. As a pre-order bonus for the album on the iTunes Store, "Derezzed" was released as a single on December 8, 2010. The iTunes Store release of the album includes two bonus tracks: "Father and Son" and "Outlands, Pt. II". The Amazon MP3 Download version of the album includes the bonus track "Sea of Simulation". The Nokia Ovi Music Store release of the album includes the bonus track "Sunrise Prelude". The Complete Edition, released as part of the film's 10th anniversary, includes all bonus tracks in addition to the standard tracks.

The songs "Separate Ways (Worlds Apart)" by Journey and "Sweet Dreams (Are Made of This)" by Eurythmics are featured in the film, but absent from the soundtrack album. The track "Outlands" was used as the intro for Sky Sports' F1 broadcasts in the UK and Ireland from the 2019 season until the end of the 2025 season.

== Critical reception ==
Professional ratings
Aggregate scores
Source	Rating
Metacritic	71/100
Review scores
Source	Rating
AllMusic	4/5 stars
The A.V. Club	B
Chicago Tribune	2.5/4 stars
Clash	7/10
Entertainment.ie	4/5 stars
Entertainment Weekly	B
Los Angeles Times	3/4 stars
NME	8/10
Pitchfork	5.5/10
Rolling Stone	3/5 stars
Slant Magazine	2.5/5 stars
Spin	7/10

At Metacritic, which assigns a normalized rating out of 100 to reviews from mainstream critics, the Tron: Legacy soundtrack received an average score of 71, based on 27 reviews, indicating "generally favorable reviews". A review in AllMusic commented on the blend of electronic and orchestral music, specifically noting that in "The Son of Flynn" the "arpeggios and strings are so tightly knit that they finish each others' phrases". The A.V. Club observed the "synergistic dream" of Daft Punk's robotic personae with the film's science fiction aesthetic, further stating that the album "is neither groundbreaking experiment nor crucial entry in the duo's catalog, but it's an adeptly realized, tonally complementary companion" to the film. Similarly, a Clash review remarked: "As a stand-alone album, what Guy-Manuel de Homem-Christo and Thomas Bangalter have created won't sate the disco heads screaming for more club material, however as an accomplished score it can only make a legendary film yet more cherished.

Pitchfork Media expressed that the Tron: Legacy soundtrack is the continuation of Daft Punk's growing interest in complementing music with visual imagery, noting the duo's previous Alive 2006/2007 tour and feature film Interstella 5555 as examples. A review in Spin also pointed out Daft Punk's history with filmmakers in the duo's earliest music videos and "That Daft Punk's Guy-Manuel de Homem-Christo and Thomas Bangalter would score Tron: Legacy seems destined."

Christian Clemmensen of Filmtracks.com spoke highly of the score, awarding the music 4 out of 5 stars calling it "a success of a score", but panned its treatment on the various commercial releases stating, "There have been many disgraceful releases of soundtracks over the previous ten years, but the situation with Tron: Legacy not only establishes a new low in terms of the division of the score onto differing products, but also makes no sense for the market in 2010. In order for a fan of this score to acquire all of the commercially available music for Tron: Legacy (amounting to almost 80 minutes), he or she will be forced, at least initially, to purchase three of four separate products. Forget the fact that 79 minutes of this score would have fit nicely onto one CD."

The soundtrack debuted at number 10 on the Billboard 200 albums chart with sales of 71,000 copies. This marked the duo's first top 10 album/soundtrack in the United States. In its second week, the soundtrack dropped to number 33 on the Billboard 200. It managed to sell an additional 67,000 copies in its third week of release, coming in at number 27 on the Billboard 200. In its fourth week, the soundtrack rose to a new peak position of number 6 on the Billboard 200 selling an additional 54,000 copies. In its fifth week, the album reached a new peak of number 4 by selling 34,000 copies. As of November 17, 2011, Tron: Legacy was awarded with a gold certification for 500,000 units sold. On January 10, 2023, it was certified platinum with over 1 million units sold.

Tron: Legacy received an award for "Best Original Score" from the Austin Film Critics Association, and was nominated for Score of the Year and Breakout Composer of the Year, and won Best Original Score for a Fantasy/Science Fiction/Horror Film by the International Film Music Critics Association. The soundtrack album was nominated for Best Score Soundtrack Album for Visual Media at the 54th Grammy Awards.

== Track listing ==
All music is composed by Thomas Bangalter and Guy-Manuel de Homem-Christo.

Standard edition
No.	Title	Length
1.	"Overture"	2:28
2.	"The Grid" (featuring Jeff Bridges)	1:37
3.	"The Son of Flynn"	1:35
4.	"Recognizer"	2:38
5.	"Armory"	2:03
6.	"Arena"	1:33
7.	"Rinzler"	2:18
8.	"The Game Has Changed"	3:25
9.	"Outlands"	2:42
10.	"Adagio for Tron"	4:11
11.	"Nocturne"	1:42
12.	"End of Line"	2:36
13.	"Derezzed"	1:44
14.	"Fall"	1:23
15.	"Solar Sailer"	2:42
16.	"Rectifier"	2:14
17.	"Disc Wars"	4:11
18.	"C.L.U."	4:39
19.	"Arrival"	2:00
20.	"Flynn Lives"	3:22
21.	"Tron Legacy (End Titles)"	3:18
22.	"Finale"	4:23
Total length:		58:44

Special Edition bonus disc
No.	Title	Length
1.	"ENCOM, Part I"	3:53
2.	"ENCOM, Part II"	2:18
3.	"Round One"	1:41
4.	"Castor"	2:19
5.	"Reflections"	2:42
Total length:		12:53

iTunes Store bonus tracks
No.	Title	Length
23.	"Father and Son"	3:12
24.	"Outlands, Part II"	2:53
Total length:		6:05

Amazon MP3 Download bonus track
No.	Title	Length
23.	"Sea of Simulation"	2:41
Total length:		2:41

Nokia Ovi Music Store bonus track
No.	Title	Length
23.	"Sunrise Prelude"	2:50
Total length:		2:50

Vinyl edition bonus tracks
No.	Title	Length
23.	"Sea of Simulation"	2:42
24.	"ENCOM Part 2"	2:18
25.	"ENCOM Part 1"	3:53
26.	"Round One"	1:41
27.	"Castor"	2:19
28.	"Reflections"	2:42
29.	"Sunrise Prelude"	2:51
Total length:		18:21

The Complete Edition
No.	Title	Length
23.	"Sea of Simulation"	2:42
24.	"ENCOM Part II"	2:18
25.	"ENCOM Part I"	3:53
26.	"Round One"	1:41
27.	"Castor"	2:19
28.	"Reflections"	2:42
29.	"Sunrise Prelude"	2:51
30.	"Father and Son"	3:12
31.	"Outlands, Part II"	2:53
Total length:		24:26

== Personnel ==
Adapted from the Tron: Legacy soundtrack liner notes.

- Daft Punk – producer
- Mitchell Leib – producer
- Joseph Kosinski – executive producer
- Sean Bailey – executive producer
- Jason Bentley – music supervisor
- Joseph Trapanese – arranger and orchestrator
- Gavin Greenaway – conductor
- Bruce Broughton – orchestration consultant

== Charts ==
=== Weekly charts ===
Weekly chart performance for Tron: Legacy
Chart (2010–2011)	Peak position
Australian Albums (ARIA)	17
Austrian Albums (Ö3 Austria)	14
Belgian Albums (Ultratop Flanders)	14
Belgian Albums (Ultratop Wallonia)	20
Canadian Albums (Billboard)	17
Danish Albums (Hitlisten)	35
Dutch Albums (Album Top 100)	83
French Albums (SNEP)	25
German Albums (Offizielle Top 100)	17
Irish Albums (IRMA)	48
Italian Albums (FIMI)	41
Mexican Albums (AMPROFON)	5
New Zealand Albums (RMNZ)	27
Scottish Albums (Official Charts)	42
Spanish Albums (Promusicae)	30
Swedish Albums (Sverigetopplistan)	45
Swiss Albums (Schweizer Hitparade)	21
UK Albums (Official Charts)	39
UK Dance Albums (Official Charts)	1
US Billboard 200	4
US Top Dance Albums (Billboard)	1
US Soundtrack Albums (Billboard)	1

=== Year-end charts ===
2010 year-end chart performance for Tron: Legacy
Chart (2010)	Position
French Albums (SNEP)	170

2011 year-end chart performance for Tron: Legacy
Chart (2011)	Position
Belgian Albums (Ultratop Wallonia)	96
French Albums (SNEP)	121
Mexican Albums (Top 100 Mexico)	85
US Billboard 200	65
US Top Dance/Electronic Albums (Billboard)	2
US Soundtrack Albums (Billboard)	4

2012 year-end chart performance for Tron: Legacy
Chart (2012)	Position
US Top Dance/Electronic Albums (Billboard)	15

== Certifications ==
Certifications and sales for Tron: Legacy
Region	Certification	Certified units/sales
Australia (ARIA)	Gold	35,000^{^}
France (SNEP)	Gold	50,000^{*}
United Kingdom (BPI)	Gold	100,000^{^}
United States (RIAA)	Platinum	1,000,000^{‡}
^{*} Sales figures based on certification alone.^{^} Shipments figures based on certification alone.^{‡} Sales+streaming figures based on certification alone.

== Remix album ==
Walt Disney Records released a remix album of the score titled Tron: Legacy Reconfigured on April 5, 2011. The album features remixes of selections of the film score by various artists.
