= Martini (surname) =

Martini is an Italian surname.

== Geographical distribution ==
As of 2014, 33.1% of all known bearers of the surname Martini were residents of Italy (frequency 1:1,079), 22.1% of Indonesia (1:3,494), 13.0% of Brazil (1:9,197), 7.1% of Tanzania (1:4,235), 6.2% of the United States (1:34,281), 4.4% of Germany (1:10,746), 3.5% of Argentina (1:7,191), 2.8% of France (1:13,999) and 1.2% of Albania (1:1,400).

In Italy, the frequency of the surname was higher than the national average (1:1,079) in the following regions:

1. Tuscany (1:281)
2. Liguria (1:377)
3. Veneto (1:474)
4. Trentino-Alto Adige/Südtirol (1:725)
5. Umbria (1:848)
6. Lazio (1:869)
7. Piedmont (1:889)
8. Emilia-Romagna (1:911)

== People ==
- Alessandro Martini (1812–1905), Italian businessman, founder of Martini & Rossi distillery
- Alviero Martini (born 1950), Italian fashion designer
- Angela Martini (born 1986), Albanian model
- Anita Martini, American journalist
- Anneli Martini (born 1948), Swedish actress
- Antonio Martini (1720–1809), Italian Archbishop and Bible translator
- Arturo Martini (1889–1947), Italian sculptor
- Bruno Martini (1962–2020), French footballer
- Carlo Maria Martini (1927–2012), Catholic cardinal
- Cathleen Martini (born 1982), German bobsledder
- Chuck Martini (born 1970), Moroccan former footballer
- Corinna Martini (born 1985), German luger
- Edi Martini (born 1975), Albanian football manager and former player
- Eduardo Martini (born 1979), Brazilian football (soccer) player
- Elisabeth Martini (1886–1984), American architect
- Erich Martini (1880–1960), German physician, zoologist and malariologist
- Ferdinand Martini (1870–1930), German film actor
- Ferdinando Martini (1841–1928), Italian writer and politician
- Flavio Martini (born 1945), Italian cyclist
- Francesco di Giorgio Martini (1439–1502), Italian painter, sculptor, architect and military engineer
- Francesco De Martini (1903–1981), Italian officer
- Friedrich Martini (legal scholar) (died 1630), German legal scholar and lecturer
- Friedrich Heinrich Wilhelm Martini (1729–1778), German physician
- Friedrich von Martini (1833–1897), Swiss engineer and inventor
- Giovanni Battista Martini (1706–1784), Italian musician
- Jandira Martini (1945–2024), Brazilian actress and author of theatre and screenplays
- Jean Paul Egide Martini (1741–1816), Franco-German composer
- Jerry Martini (born 1942), American musician
- Joachim Carlos Martini (1931–2015), Chilean-born German conductor
- Johannes Martini (1440–1498), Franco-Flemish composer
- Johannes Martini (painter) (1866–1935), German oil painter and graphic artist
- Leandro Martini (born 1974), Argentine football manager and former player
- Martino Martini (1614–1661), Italian Jesuit missionary and cartographer of China
- Mauro Martini (born 1964), Italian race car driver
- Max Martini (born 1969), American actor
- Mia Martini (1947–1995), Italian singer
- Mimosa Martini (1961), Italian journalist, anchorwoman, and writer
- Mohammad Rami Radwan Martini (born 1970), Syrian politician
- Moreno Martini (1935–2009), Italian athlete
- Nino Martini, Italian operatic tenor who also appeared in Hollywood movies of the 1930s
- Olaus Martini, Latin form of Olof Mårtensson (1557–1609), Swedish archbishop of Uppsala
- Oliver Martini (born 1971), Italian racing driver
- Paul Martini (born 1960), Canadian figure skater
- Percy Martini (1888–1961), Australian rules footballer
- Pierluigi Martini (born 1961), Italian racing driver
- Richard Martini (born 1955), American film director, producer, screenwriter and freelance journalist
- Richard Martini (born 1978), French footballer
- Silia Martini (1908–?), Italian high jumper and basketball player
- Simone Martini (1284–1344), Italian painter
- Steve Martini (born 1946), American legal suspense writer
- Stina Martini (born 1993), Austrian pair skater
- Tosca Bucarelli Martini (1922–2000), Italian Partisan and politician
- Truth Martini (born 1975), Albanian-American professional wrestler, manager, and trainer
- Vanessa Martini (born 1989), German footballer
- Vittore Martini (1912–1993), Italian footballer
- William J. Martini (born 1947), U.S. District Court Judge
- Wolfgang Martini (1891–1963), German Air Force Officer, largely responsible for promoting early radar development

== See also ==
- Martini (disambiguation)
- Mardini, an Arabic surname
- Marti (surname)
- Martin (surname)
- Martinis
