= Bahia (disambiguation) =

Bahia (a former spelling of the Portuguese word for "bay") is a state in Brazil.

Bahia may also refer to:

== Places ==
- Salvador, Bahia, the capital city of the state of Bahia
- Captaincy of Bahia, the colonial Brazilian administration of the area of present-day Bahia
- Bahia Province, the imperial Brazilian administration of the area of present-day Bahia
- Bahía Blanca, a city in Argentina
- Bahía de Caráquez, a city in Ecuador
- Bahia Honda Key, an island in the Florida Keys
- Bahía Honda, Cuba, a town in Cuba
- Bahía de Cata, a beach of Aragua state, Venezuela
- Bahia Palace, palace in Morocco

== Other uses ==
- Bahia (album), 1958 album by John Coltrane
- Bahia (plant), small genus of perennial flowering plants in the family Asteraceae
- Bahia 22, French sailboat design
- Bahía culture, pre-Columbian culture in present-day Ecuador
- Bahia Emerald, one of the largest emeralds ever found
- Bahia grass (P. notatum), tropical to subtropical perennial grass
- Brazilian ship Bahia, several ships of the Brazilian Navy
- Esporte Clube Bahia, Brazilian football club
- Axé Bahia, Brazilian music group
- "Bahia", song by Ary Barroso commonly known as "Na Baixa do Sapateiro"

== People ==
- Bahia (name), list of people with the name

== See also ==
- Bahiyyih, a given name
- Bahai (disambiguation)
- Baha (disambiguation)
