= Bohai =

Bohai may refer to:

- Bohai Sea, or Bo Hai, the innermost gulf of the Yellow Sea
- Parhae, known as Bohai in Chinese, a former mixed Mohe-Goguryeo empire which existed from 698 to 926 in Manchuria

== Locations or areas in China ==
- Bohai Bay, one of three bays surrounding Bohai Sea, immediately east of Tianjin
- Bohai Strait, a water channel between Shandong Peninsula and Liaodong Peninsula
- Bohai Commandery, a historical commandery in imperial China
- Bohai Economic Rim, economic region around the Bohai Sea and the Yellow River Delta
- Bohai Shipyard, a massive industrial enterprise in Huludao City in Liaoning.
- Bohai Township (zh; 渤海乡), subdivision of Shanhaiguan District, Qinhuangdao, Hebei

Subdistricts (渤海街道)

- Bohai Subdistrict, Dunhua (zh), in Dunhua City, Jilin
- Bohai Subdistrict, Huludao (zh), in Lianshan District, Huludao, Liaoning
- Bohai Subdistrict, Panjin (zh), in Xinglongtai District, Panjin, Liaoning

Towns (渤海镇)

- Bohai, Beijing (zh), in Huairou District, Beijing
- Bohai, Heilongjiang (zh), in Ning'an, Heilongjiang
- Bohai, Zhejiang (zh), in Jingning She Autonomous County, Zhejiang

== See also ==
- Bahai (disambiguation)
