= Bahia (name) =

Bahia is a unisex given name and a surname. Notable people with the name include:

== Given name ==
=== Female ===
- Lalla Bahia, full name Lalla Bahia bint Antar (died 2008), Moroccan royal
- Bahia Bakari (born 1996), French woman who is a survivor of an ocean crash
- Bahia Boussad (born 1979), Algerian athlete
- Bahia Hariri (born 1952), Lebanese politician
- Bahia Mardini, Syrian Kurdish writer
- Bahia Mouhtassine (born 1979), Moroccan tennis player
- Bahia Shehab (born 1977), Egyptian–Lebanese artist and historian

=== Male ===
- Bahia (footballer, born 1910), Antônio Almeida (1910–death date unknown), Brazilian football player
- Bahía (footballer, born 1958), Mario de Souza Mota, Brazilian football player

== Surname ==
- Alan Bahia (born 1983), Brazilian football player
- André Bahia (born 1983), Brazilian football player
- Fábio Bahia (born 1983), Brazilian football player
- Gil Bahia (born 1992), Brazilian football player
- Jeferson Bahia (born 1992), Brazilian football player
- Léo Bahia (footballer, born 1986) (born 1986), Brazilian football player
- Léo Bahia (born 1994), Brazilian football player
- Loli Bahia, French model
- Matheus Bahia (born 1999), Brazilian football player
- Mike Bahía, stage name of Michael Egred Mejía (born 1987), Brazilian musician
- Paramjit Bahia (born 1950), Canadian field hockey player
- Patricia Bahia, American musical artist
- Salomé de Bahia (born 1945), Brazilian vocalist
- Viviane Bahia (born 1994), Brazilian water polo player

== See also ==
- Bahia (disambiguation)
