= Friedrich Martini =

Friedrich Martini may refer to:

- Friedrich Martini (legal scholar) (died 1630), German legal scholar and lecturer
- Friedrich Heinrich Wilhelm Martini (1729–1778), German physician, translator and conchologist.
- Friedrich von Martini (1833–1897), Swiss engineer and inventor, for whom the Martini–Henry rifle was named in part
