= .43 Egyptian =

Rifle cartridge

- Type: Rifle
- Place of origin: United States

Service history
- Used by: See § Users
- Wars: Franco-Prussian War; Egyptian–Ethiopian War; Urabi revolt; Mahdist War; Anglo-Egyptian War; Italo-Ethiopian War of 1887–1889; First Italo-Ethiopian War; World War I

Production history
- Produced: 1866–1916

Specifications
- Case type: Rimmed, Bottleneck
- Bullet diameter: .448 in (11.38 mm)
- Neck diameter: .484 in (12.3 mm)
- Shoulder diameter: .535 (13.6 mm)
- Rim diameter: .63 in (16.0 mm)
- Case length: 1.937 in (49.2 mm)
- Overall length: 2.559 in (65.0 mm)
- Primer type: Berdan

Ballistic performance
| Bullet mass/type | Velocity | Energy |
|---|---|---|
| 465 gr (30 g) Lead | 1,280 ft/s (390 m/s) | 1,690 ft⋅lbf (2,290 J) |
| 400 gr (26 g) Lead | 1,330 ft/s (410 m/s) | 1,570 ft⋅lbf (2,130 J) |

The .43 Egyptian / 11.38x49mmR was a centerfire rifle cartridge used by the Egyptian Army and France for the Remington Rolling Block rifle. Used between 1870 and the end of the First World War by Egypt, France, Ethiopia, Sudan, and Italy, it closely resembles the .43 Spanish cartridge, but they are not interchangeable.

== Design ==
Original military loads used a 400 grains (26 g) lead bullet patched with paper loaded with 75 gr (4.9 g) of black powder. According to author Frank C. Barnes, the .43 Egyptian is suitable for most American game and have a performance comparable to the 11×60mm Mauser. The cartridge case body was initially made of rolled brass foil attached to a iron base disc with a Rodman-Crispin or Boxer primer, (Note: Colonel Edward Mounier Boxer's earliest cartridge designs—the .577 Snider and rolled brass .577/450 Martini–Henry—were similar in construction to the Rodman-Crispin patent.) later replaced by a drawn brass case with a Berdan primer.

The .43 Egyptian closely resembles the .43 Spanish, though they aren't interchangeable; it can be chambered and fired in the M1871 Beaumont, with old Remington catalogs listing it as suitable for Beaumont rifles, but the 11.3×50mmR and 11×52mmR Beaumont cartridges also aren't interchangeable.

== History ==
After the Egyptian Army conducted trials with Remington, Martini, and Henry rifles in 1869 and the Khedive Ismail held direct talks with Samuel Remington, the Khedive placed an initial order in that same year for 60,000 Remington Rolling Block rifles chambered for a cartridge that became known as the .43 Egyptian.

An additional order for 100,000 rifles was delayed as French demand for weapons for the Franco-Prussian War of 1870 absorbed all of Remington's production capacity; Seeing an opportunity to improve his relationship with Paris, the Khedive agreed to 'default' on his order, allowing the French to buy the whole lot. The order was eventually completed in 1876.

Remington rifles were used in the Egyptian–Ethiopian War and during the conflict, a large number of rifles were captured and pressed into service by the Ethiopians, seeing use against the Mahdists and Italians, the latter also issued Egyptian rifles to their colonial troops. During the Mahdist War, the followers of Muhammad Ahmad captured a large number of Remington rifles from the Egyptian forces, using them alongside swords and spears.

The .43 Egyptian was initially produced by the B.C. English company in Springfield, Massachusetts. The Remington contract with Ismail also included setting up cartridge factories and workshops were built in Alexandria, Cairo, Suez, and Khartoum; In 1882, prior to the Anglo-Egyptian War, the cartridge factory in Cairo employed 2,000 people and produced 60,000 rounds per day; according to author John P. Dunn, the Egyptian quality control was inconsistent, but "Ismail was very proud of these ventures, so much so," that he presented a locally made bullet mound at the Vienna International Exposition in 1873. After the British occupation of Egypt in 1882, local production of .43 Egyptian cartridges was soon discontinued. Most American and European cartridge manufacturers kept it in production after the Egyptian Remington rifles were sold as military surplus.

Surplus rifles remained in civilian use well into the 20th century and even saw limited use in the Middle Eastern theatre of World War I, with large scale commercial production of .43 Egyptian ammunition continuing as late as 1916.

== Users ==
- Khedivate of Egypt
- Ethiopian Empire
- France
- Kingdom of Italy
- Mahdist State
