= Mardini =

Mardini is a surname derived from Al-Mardini (Arabic: المارديني), which denotes an origin from Mardin, Upper Mesopotamia.

People with the surname include:

- Bahia Mardini (fl. 2000s–2020s), Syrian Kurdish researcher in international law
- Masawaih al-Mardini (died 1015), Assyrian physician
- Robert Mardini (born 1972), Lebanese-born Swiss Red Cross director
- Sarah Mardini (born 1995), Syrian former competition swimmer, lifeguard and human rights activist, portrayed in the 2022 biographical film, The Swimmers.
- Yusra Mardini (born 1998), Syrian Olympic swimmer portrayed in the 2022 biographical film, The Swimmers

== See also ==
- Mardin (surname), Turkish surname
- Mahishasura Mardini, 1959 Indian Kannada-language film
- Martini (surname), Italian surname
