= Al-Mardini =

Al-Mardini (Arabic: المارديني) denotes an origin from Mardin, Upper Mesopotamia. Al-Mardini may refer to:

- Masawaih al-Mardini, 11th-century physician
- Sibt al-Mardini, 15th-century Egyptian-born astronomer and mathematician

== See also ==
- Mardini, a related surname
