= Martinis (disambiguation) =

Martinis is an Italian surname.

Martiniș or Mărtiniș may also refer to:

- Mărtiniș, commune in Harghita County, Romania

== Music ==
- The Martinis, American rock band
- Martinis & Bikinis, seventh studio album by American singer and songwriter Sam Phillips

== See also ==
- Martini (disambiguation)
