= Maatouk =

Maatouk (Arabic: معتوق) is an Arabic surname. It derives from the Arabic word for "emancipation" (عتقَ), and means "free from slavery", or "freedman".

Maatouk or Maatouq may also refer to:

- Ali Maatouk (born 1988), Libyan footballer
- Amer Maatouq Al Fadhel (born 1988), Kuwaiti footballer
- Ghassan Maatouk (born 1977), Syrian football player and coach
- Hassan Maatouk (born 1987), Lebanese footballer
- Jean Matouk (1937–2020), French economist
- Khalil Maatouk, Syrian lawyer
- Mikie Mahtook (born 1989), American baseball player
- Muhammed Abu Maatouk (born 1950), Syrian playwright
- Toufic Maatouk, Lebanese orchestra conductor
