= ElecTRONica =

Former Disney California Adventure event

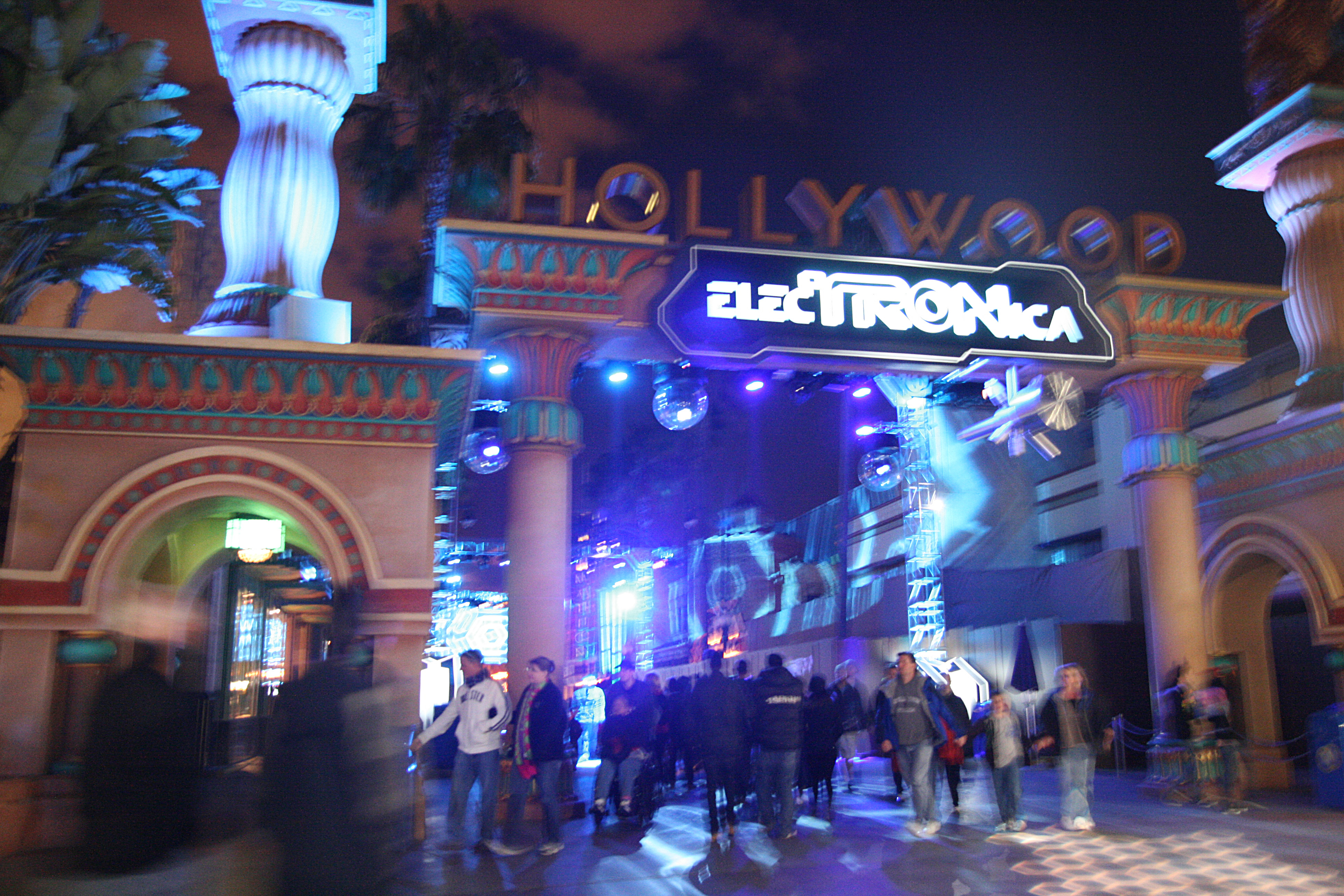
- The attraction entrance at Disney California Adventure

Disney California Adventure
- Area: Hollywood Land
- Status: Removed
- Opening date: October 8, 2010
- Closing date: April 16, 2012
- Replaced: Glow Fest
- Replaced by: Mad T Party

Ride statistics
- Designer: Walt Disney Imagineering
- Theme: TRON
- Music: Electro house, electronica

ElecTRONica (stylized as elecTRONica) was a nighttime event at Disney California Adventure in the Disneyland Resort in Anaheim, California. Located in the Hollywood Land section of the park, ElecTRONica premiered on October 8, 2010. The attraction featured music, dancing, beverages and a re-creation of Flynn's Arcade from the TRON franchise. For a limited time, guests could also watch a sneak preview of the 2010 film TRON: Legacy in Mickey's PhilharMagic (previously Muppet*Vision 3D). The attraction was discontinued on April 15, 2012, removed on April 16, and replaced a month later by Mad T Party.

== Technology ==
The nighttime event featured high-powered searchlights, lasers, and music, as well as one of the most technologically advanced projection mapping displays in Disney Parks history.

== History ==
Conceived as a tie-in to the TRON: Legacy film, ElecTRONica was a successor of sorts to Glow Fest, a nighttime dance party that took place at Disney California Adventure during the summer of 2010. Disney held an open call in September for hip-hop dancers with a martial arts experience. ElecTRONica debuted on October 8, 2010, and it was originally scheduled to run until April 17, 2011. It was then extended through Labor Day, and Disney later announced the event would continue through April 15, 2012. It was confirmed and ran for a total of 555 days (1.52055 calendar years). The Mad T Party, a completely different show based on Tim Burton's Alice in Wonderland, replaced it, beginning on May 26, 2012.

== Features ==
While scenes from TRON: Legacy were shown across building facades in the Hollywood Land area, a grid-like DJ platform made up the ElecTRONica centerpiece, as a live DJ played electronic dance music from such artists as Daft Punk.

=== Laserman ===
Also appearing on stage was Laserman, who created and performed tricks set to music with lasers and lights. A new version of the show premiered on June 17, 2011, titled LASERMAN 2.0 R3CONF1GUR3D. It featured new choreography as well as music from the Daft Punk remix album, Tron: Legacy Reconfigured.

=== End of Line Club ===
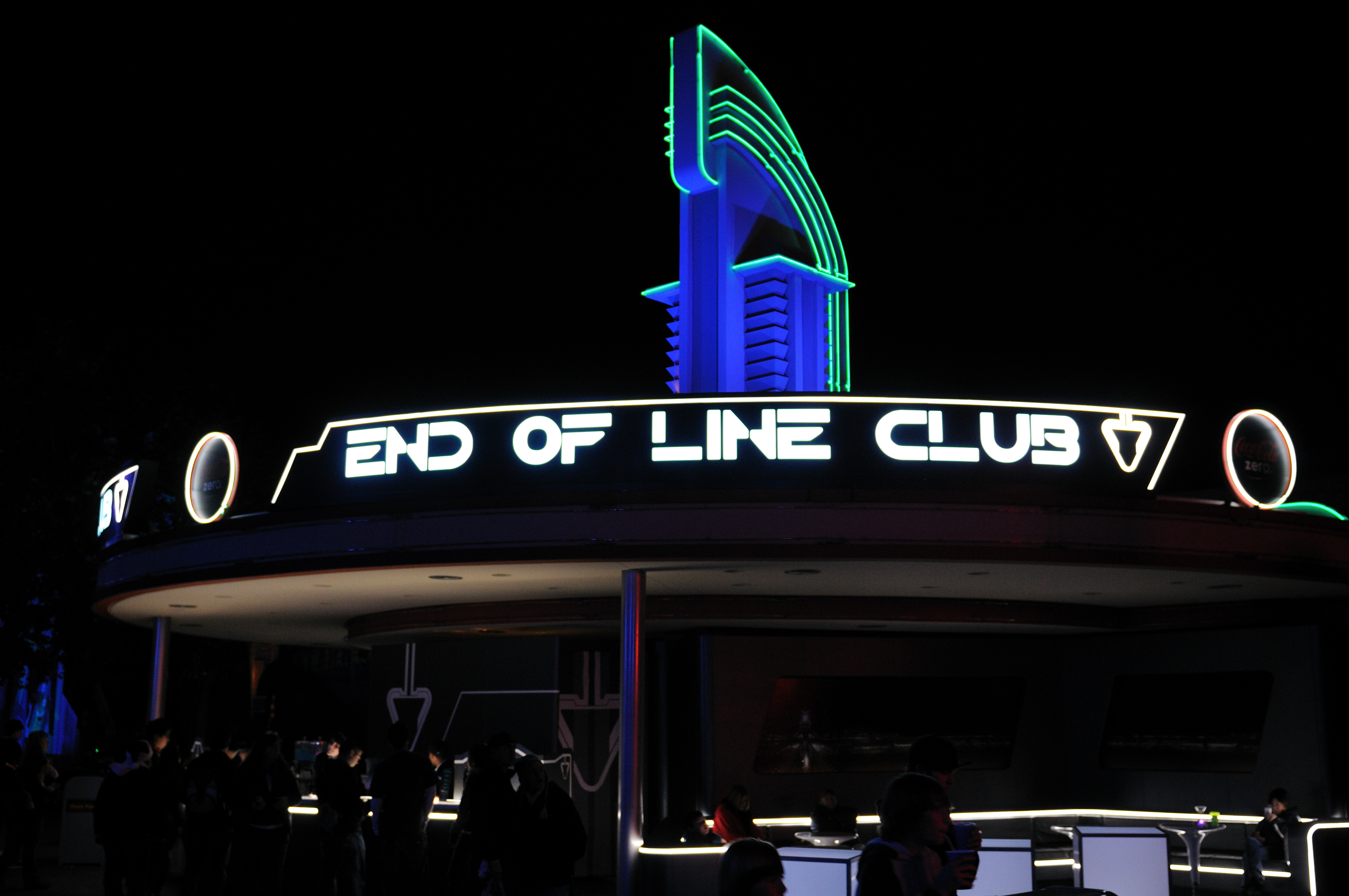
The End of Line Club was a TRON-themed bar and lounge.

Based on the night club located inside the Grid during TRON: Legacy, the End of Line Club served glowing alcoholic and non-alcoholic beverages. Among the alcoholic options were Glowjito mojitos and blinking Digitini martinis. Non-alcoholic choices included Coke Zero and Laser Light Lemonade. A nearby food truck offered nachos and chocolate cake.

=== Flynn's Arcade ===
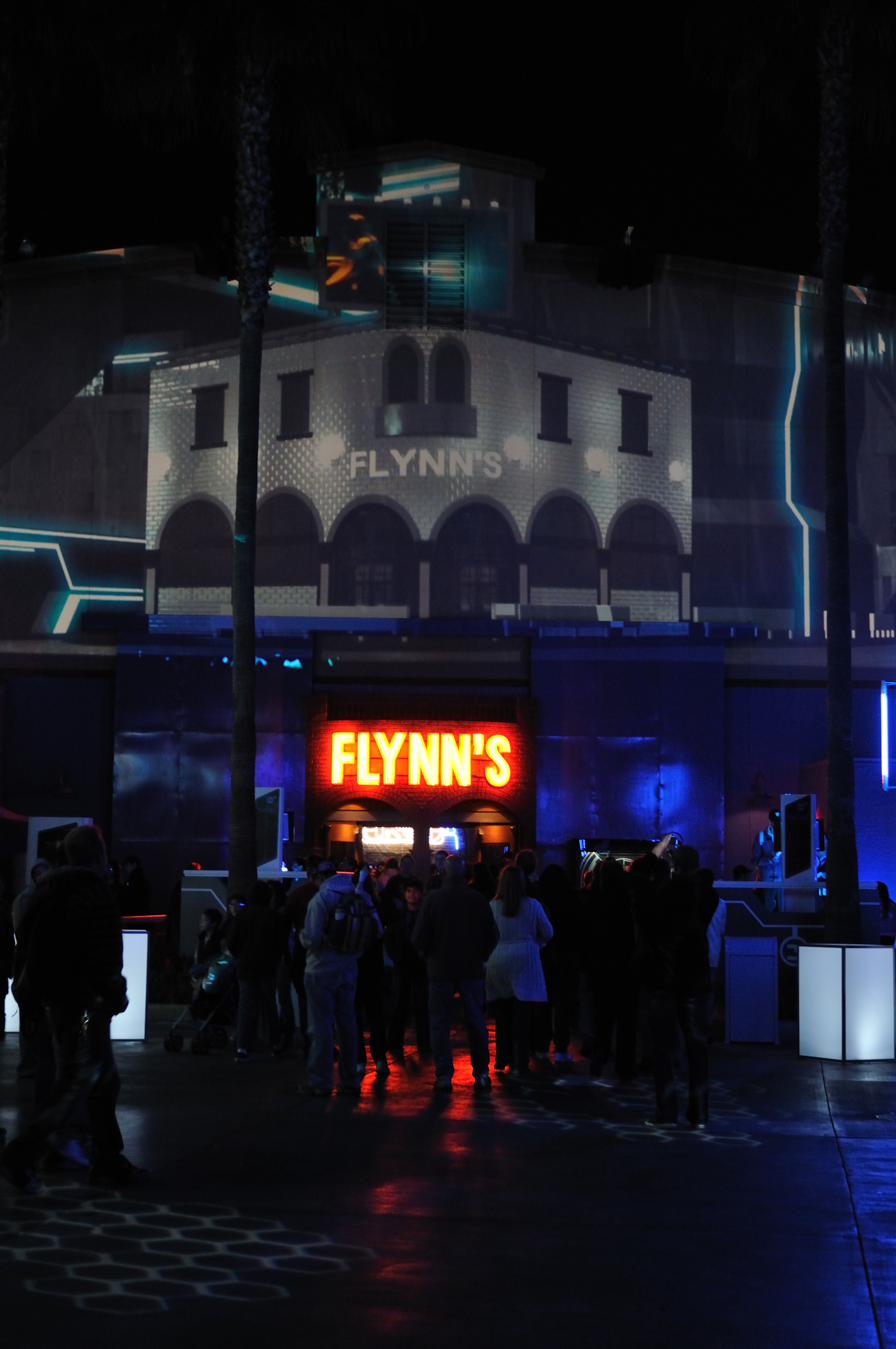
Flynn's Arcade, modeled after the fictional arcade from the TRON films

In this replica of the arcade seen in the TRON films, guests played vintage 1980s video games such as TRON (based on the original movie), Battlezone, Centipede, Frogger, Donkey Kong, Donkey Kong Junior, Donkey Kong 3, Mario Bros., Popeye, Pac-Man, Ms. Pac-Man, Pole Position, Red Baron and Zaxxon. Flynn's Arcade also housed what Disney Imagineer Craig Pierce claimed was the world's only coin-operated version of Space Paranoids, a game that had previously existed in the original TRON film. All games required a token, or the equivalent of a quarter, to play. Located just outside the arcade, guests could have also played the 2010 TRON: Evolution game.

=== TRON: Legacy 3D Exclusive ===
Prior to the December 17, 2010 release in U.S. theaters of TRON: Legacy, guests could view the TRON: Legacy 3D Exclusive of the film in Mickey's PhilharMagic.

== Deresolution (Derezzolution) ==
"One More Time" played for the final time, and it was the final song of the event. The LED screens turned off and the song began. Once this song was finished, a 10-second countdown was given. Once it concluded, five large booms along with the powering down sound and its sixth large boom in the area dimmed its lights for good. After a few moments, the three words END OF LINE appeared. The word COMPLETE popped up and then it disappeared after a few seconds. The lasers were projected onto the roof and said END OF LINE. Thirty seconds after the white lights lit up the area, the lasers (colored red) were turned off. When the white lights reached to its maximum level, the event ended.

== See also ==
- 2012 in amusement parks
- Luminosity — Ignite the Night!
