= Remington Rolling Block rifle =

Remington Rolling Block
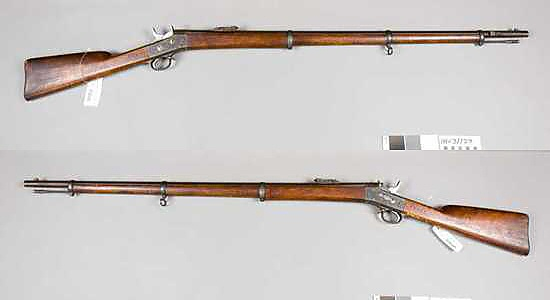
- Type: Rolling-block rifle
- Place of origin: United States

Service history
- In service: 1867–1918
- Wars: List of wars: American Indian Wars; Wars of Italian unification; War of the Triple Alliance (limited); Six Years' War; Franco-Prussian War; Ten Years' War; Shinmiyangyo; Third Carlist War; Cantonal rebellion; Conquest of the Desert; Ethiopian–Egyptian War; Serbian–Ottoman Wars (1876–1878); Russo-Turkish War; Little War; Mahdist War; Mapuche uprising of 1881; Anglo-Egyptian War; South African Wars (1879–1915); War of the Pacific; Revolution of the Park; Chilean Civil War of 1891; Federalist Revolution; First Melillan campaign; Cuban War of Independence; Uruguayan Revolution of 1897; Intentona de Yauco; Philippine Revolution; Greco-Turkish War (1897); Spanish–American War; Philippine–American War; Totoposte Wars; Revolution of 1904; Mexican Revolution; Italo-Turkish War; First Dominican Civil War; Second Dominican Civil War; World War I; Anglo-Egyptian Darfur Expedition; United States occupation of the Dominican Republic (1916–1924); Coto War; Second Honduran Civil War; Second Italo-Ethiopian War

Production history
- Designer: Joseph Rider
- Designed: 1864
- Manufacturer: Remington Arms Company

Specifications
- Mass: 9.25 lb (4.20 kg)
- Length: 50.4 in (1,280 mm) to 53.3 in (1,350 mm)
- Barrel length: 35.7 in (910 mm) to 37.4 in (950 mm)
- Cartridge: .58 Berdan.50-70.50-45 Carbine; 12.7×45mmR Pontificio; 12.17×42mm RF; 12.17×44mmR.45-70.43 Spanish.43 Egyptian; 10.15×61mmR; 8×58mmR Danish Krag; 8×50mmR Lebel; 11×59mmR Gras.303 British; 7.65×53mm Argentine.30-40 Krag.30-06 Springfield; 7.62×54mmR.30 Remington; 7×57mm Mauser; 6.5mm Daudeteau No. 12.236 Remington; 11 mm Danish; 56-50 Spencer Various Target/Sporting/Hunting Calibers
- Action: Rolling block
- Feed system: Breech-loading
- Sights: Rear ramp & leaf sight, blade front sight

Remington Rolling Block is a family of breech-loading rifles that was produced from the mid-1860s into the early 20th century by E. Remington and Sons (later Remington Arms).

These rifles were made in a variety of calibers, both rimfire and centerfire, including the 12.17x42 mm rimfire, 12.17x44 mm rimfire and 12.17x44 mm rimmed centerfire Swedish and Norwegian cartridges, .43 Spanish (11.15x58mmR), .50-70, .40-70, .45-70 and later in .22 caliber. Later models were produced in .30-03 (Predecessor to .30-06), 7×57mm Mauser, and 8×50mmR Lebel.

== Development ==
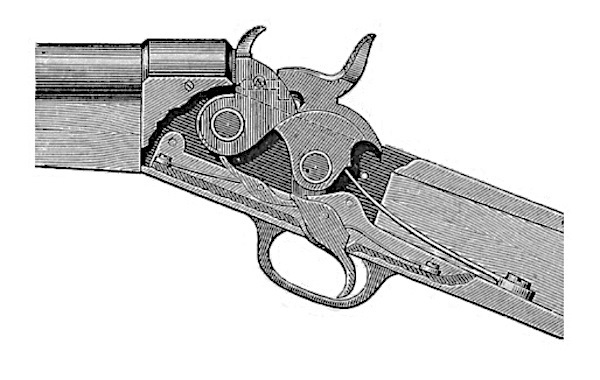
Rolling-block breech

The Remington Rolling Block was developed from the 1863 pattern .50 calibre split breech carbine issued to the US Cavalry during the American Civil War. This earlier weapon was designed by Joseph Rider and Leonard Geiger to fire the same cartridges as the Spencer carbine. The split breech rifle lacked a hammer spur because it self-cocked when the breechblock was opened. Either 1864 or 1865, Remington Engineer Joseph Rider improved the split breech design to create the rolling-block action which was named the "Remington System".

The medium-strength action developed some headspace issues with new smokeless powders coming into use by the late 1890s. A heavier-style action was produced for later smokeless cartridges, although there were still issues with some ammunition.

== Military use ==
=== Sweden and Norway ===
In 1867, the United Kingdoms of Sweden and Norway was the first military to adopt the rifle as the standard military rifle. Around 250,000 military rifles and carbines and 85,000 civilian rifles in Sweden, were produced under license by Carl Gustafs Stads Gevärsfaktori and Husqvarna Vapenfabriks Aktiebolag, and about 53,000 rifles in Norway by Kongsberg Vaapenfabrik.

In 12.17×42mmRF and 12.18×44mmRF (two cartridges that were interchangeable), and towards the end of its service life also 8×58mmR Danish Krag centerfire, the rolling-block served as the standard service rifle of the Swedish Army from 1867 to the mid-1890s, when it was replaced by the Swedish Mauser. In Norway it was the standard service rifle from 1867 to the mid-1880s, when it was replaced by the M1884 Jarmann. In .43 Spanish it was the chief service arm of the Spanish Army from 1869–1893, and was used by reserve and militia forces for many years thereafter. Many rolling-block rifles were used by Argentina before being replaced in 1891 by the new 7.65mm Mauser, and were also widely used by Egypt and Mexico.

=== Denmark ===
Like Sweden and Norway, Denmark adopted the rifle in 1867 in 11×41,5mmRF (11 mm caliber). Initially the Royal Danish Army bought 40,000 rifles and 1800 carbines in the United States between 1867–1868. Later 31,551 rifles and about 4,600 carbines were made at the government owned rifle factory in Copenhagen. Production was halted in 1888 and the last rifles were decommissioned in 1940. In Danish service it was replaced by the M/1889 Krag–Jørgensen.

=== Egypt, Ethiopia, and Sudan ===
In 1869, the Khedivate of Egypt conducted trials to replace their stocks of obsolete rifled muskets and Snider conversions of the Minié rifle, testing the Rolling Block alongside Martini and Henry rifles; following favorable results and direct negotiations between Khedive Isma'il and Samuel Remington, a contract was signed in London on 30 June 1869 for a total of 60,000 rifles chambered in .43 Egyptian. An additional order for 100,000 rifles was delayed with the French demand for weapons due to the outbreak of the Franco-Prussian War in 1870; as a gesture of goodwill, Isma'il allowed the French to purchase a large batch of rifles that were originally destined for his own army; Though deliveries resumed in 1871, it was not until 1875 that the Egyptian Army was nearly re-equipped with Remington Rolling Blocks.

According to author John P. Dunn, the Remington company shipped to Egypt a little less than 250,000 rifles and carbines from 1869–1880; While Isma'il managed to establish an ammunition factory, his plan of setting up a factory to locally produce rifles failed to materialize due to a debt crisis affecting the Khedivate.

Egyptian Remingtons were used in the Egyptian–Ethiopian War, resulting in a large number of rifles getting captured by the Ethiopians. The rifle was also used in the Mahdist War by the Egyptian Army and the Mahdists; during the Battle of Shaykan, the Mahdists used 14,000 rifles captured in previous engagements and captured thousands more after the fighting was over. According to the Westminster Gazette's war correspondent E. N. Bennet, the dervishes knocked the sights off and cut down the barrels to suit themselves, but also reducing accuracy: during the Battle of Omdurman the Mahdist opening volley was described by war correspondents as a waste of ammunition.

=== Great Britain, Germany, and France ===
The German Empire’s colonial forces briefly used American Remington Rolling Block rifles before transitioning to German-made Mauser rifles, particularly the Schutztruppe in East Africa, initially issued the old American Remington Rolling Block rifles. These rifles had previously been used by Sudanese askaris under the Anglo-Egyptian forces, the German forces relied on these rifles temporarily due to availability constraints until they could be replaced by German Mauser models such as the JB71. Over time, the Schutztruppe transitioned to more modern rifles like the Gew71, Gew88, and eventually the Kar98az, which became standard by the outbreak of World War I.

The French acquired 210,000 Egyptian rolling-block rifles to make up for a shortage of the standard-issue Chassepot and Tabatière rifles during the Franco-Prussian War.

During World War I, the British Royal Navy purchased 4,500 rolling-block rifles in 7mm Mauser from Remington's leftover stock after production had ended, issuing them to the crews of minesweepers and Q-ships. In November 1914, production of the rolling-block was resumed, in the form of a French contract for rifles in 8×50mmR Lebel, designated by France as "Fusil Remington modèle 1914". 100,291 such rifles were delivered by 1916, and used to equip rear-line troops.

== Civilian use ==
Along with the Sharps rifle, the Rolling Block was one of two rifles probably used more than any other by the buffalo hunters who hunted the American bison herds in the 1870s and 1880s.

The Rolling Block was also one of two makers rifles used by the American team to win the International Long Range matches held at Creedmoor Rifle Range on Long Island, New York, in 1874. Team members shot against the Irish team with half the shooters using Rolling Block Creedmoor models, and the other half using Sharps Model 1874 Long Range rifles.

Civilian Remington Rolling Block rifles, and later surplus military rifles, became very popular among hunters in Scandinavia, particularly for moose hunting, with ammunition for the rifles being commonly available on the civilian market into the 1920s–1930s.

The Frances Bannerman Company of New York did cartridge conversions of Remington Rolling Block actions to a number of other cartridges. Notable among these were conversions to .30-06 Springfield which was never a factory option. If encountered these rifles should be treated as unsafe to fire.

== Military users ==
- Argentina
- Austria-Hungary
- Belgium
- Bolivia
- Brazil
- Canada
- Chile
- China
- Colombia
- Costa Rica
- Cuba
- Denmark: circa 1867–1940
- Dominican Republic
- Khedivate of Egypt
- El Salvador
- Ethiopia
- France
- Kingdom of Greece
- Germany (limited)
- Guatemala
- Haiti
- Honduras
- Kingdom of Italy
- Jamaica
- Japan
- Korea
- Merina Kingdom
- Mexico
- Monaco: Compagnie des Carabiniers du Prince
- Morocco
- Netherlands
- Nicaragua
- Norway
- Panama
- Papal States
- Paraguay
- Persia
- Peru
- Puerto Rico
- First Philippine Republic : Katipunan
- Spain
- Sultanate of Darfur
- Sultanate of Zanzibar
- Mahdist Sudan: Captured from Egyptian forces
- Sweden
- United Kingdom
- United States
- Uruguay
- Trinidad and Tobago
- Venezuela
- Vietnam
- Yeke Kingdom
- Yemen

== See also ==
- Springfield model 1870, as used by the United States Navy, produced by Springfield Armory under license
- Springfield model 1871, as used by the United States Army, produced by Springfield Armory under license
