= Paramjit Bahia =

Canadian field hockey player

Personal information
- Full name: Paramjit Singh Bahia
- Born: 10 November 1950 Kukar Pind, Punjab, India
- Died: 2 February 2012 (aged 61)
Medal record
Men's field hockey
Representing Canada
Pan American Games
Silver medal – second place	1979 San Juan	Team

Paramjit Singh Bahia (10 November 1950 – 2 February 2012) is an Indian-born Canadian former field hockey player who represented Canada on the men’s National Team in the 1978 World Cup, Argentina and the 1979 Pan Am Games (silver medal), Puerto Rico.
