= Bahai (disambiguation) =

Bahai may refer to:

- A follower of or pertaining to a follower of Baháʼu'lláh.
  - Baháʼí Faith, sometimes called the Baháʼí World Faith or the Baháʼí International Community, the globally recognized Baháʼí community
  - Baháʼí Terraces also known as the Hanging Gardens of Haifa or Baháʼí gardens, part of the Baháʼí World Centre in Haifa, Israel
- Shaykh Bahai, a 16th-century physician from Persia
  - Sheikh Bahaei University, an Iranian University named after Shaykh Baha'i
- Bahai (Jurchen), a Jurchen chieftain of the Liao dynasty (926–1115) of Northern China
- Bahai (Qing dynasty), a Manchu military commander of the Qing dynasty
- Bahaï, Chad, a town in the Bourkou-Ennedi-Tibesti Region of Chad
- Takht Bahai, the remains of a famous 1st century Buddhist monastery
- "Naina Neer Bahai", a song by A. R. Rahman, part of the soundtrack to the 2005 Indian film Water

== See also ==
- Bahia (disambiguation)
- Baha (disambiguation)
- Bohai (disambiguation)
