= Martini =

Martini may refer to:

- Martini (cocktail), a drink made with gin and vermouth, garnished with an olive or a lemon twist
- Martini (vermouth), a brand of vermouth
- Martini (surname), an Italian surname
- Martini (automobile company), a Swiss automobile company
- Automobiles Martini, a French manufacturer of racing cars
- Martini Racing, motor racing teams sponsored by Martini & Rossi
- Martini (quartet), the 2012 Sweet Adelines International champion quartet
- MARTINI, a molecular dynamics force field in chemistry
- Mārtiņi, a Latvian holiday
- Martini–Henry, a rifle
- Embajador Martini, an Argentine village in Realicó Department, La Pampa

== See also ==
- Linda Martini, a Portuguese rock band
- Martini lattice, a regular two-dimensional lattice used in statistical mechanics problems such as percolation
- Martini's law, relates the depth of a dive to the effects of nitrogen narcosis
- Martiny Township, Michigan
- Martinis (disambiguation)
