= USS Sea Leopard =

Submarine of the United States

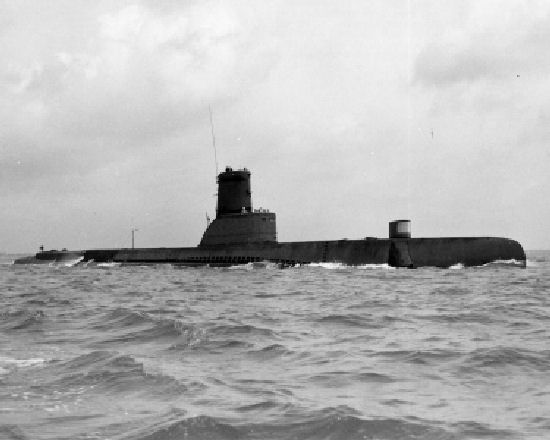

History

United States
- Name: USS Sea Leopard (SS-483)
- Builder: Portsmouth Naval Shipyard, Kittery, Maine
- Laid down: 7 November 1944
- Launched: 2 March 1945
- Commissioned: 11 June 1945
- Decommissioned: 27 March 1973
- Stricken: 27 March 1973
- Fate: Transferred to Brazil, 27 March 1973

Brazil
- Name: Bahia (S-12)
- Acquired: 27 March 1973
- Out of service: 1993
- Fate: Sold for scrap, 1998

General characteristics
- Class & type: Tench-class diesel-electric submarine
- Displacement: 1,570 tons (1,595 t) surfaced; 2,414 tons (2,453 t) submerged
- Length: 311 ft 8 in (95.00 m)
- Beam: 27 ft 4 in (8.33 m)
- Draft: 17 ft (5.2 m) maximum
- Propulsion: 4 × Fairbanks-Morse Model 38D8-⅛ 10-cylinder opposed piston diesel engines driving electrical generators; 2 × 126-cell Sargo batteries; 2 × low-speed direct-drive Elliott electric motors; two propellers; 5,400 shp (4.0 MW) surfaced; 2,740 shp (2.0 MW) submerged
- Speed: 20.25 knots (38 km/h) surfaced; 8.75 knots (16 km/h) submerged
- Range: 11,000 nautical miles (20,000 km) surfaced at 10 knots (19 km/h)
- Endurance: 48 hours at 2 knots (3.7 km/h) submerged; 75 days on patrol
- Test depth: 400 ft (120 m)
- Complement: 10 officers, 71 enlisted
- Armament: 10 × 21-inch (533 mm) torpedo tubes; (6 forward, 4 aft); 28 torpedoes; 1 × 5-inch (127 mm) / 25 caliber deck gun; Bofors 40 mm and Oerlikon 20 mm cannon

USS Sea Leopard (SS-483), a Tench-class submarine, was the only ship of the United States Navy to be named for the leopard seal. Her keel was laid down by the Portsmouth Navy Yard on 7 November 1944. She was launched on 2 March 1945 sponsored by Hon. Margaret Chase Smith, United States Congresswoman from Maine, and commissioned on 11 June 1945.

== United States Service ==
=== 1940s ===
Following shakedown off the New England coast, Sea Leopard was ordered to the Pacific War Zone. However, hostilities with Japan ceased before the submarine's departure date; and she remained in the Atlantic. The submarine then proceeded to Key West, Florida, and she remained in Florida waters through 1946 providing services to the Antisubmarine Development Force.

In January 1947, she returned to Portsmouth, New Hampshire, for her first shipyard overhaul. Next came training exercises in the Key West area until late 1948, when she entered the Philadelphia Naval Shipyard for a Greater Underwater Propulsive Power Program (GUPPY) modernization. Upon completion, she was assigned to Submarine Squadron (SubRon) 6 and home ported at Norfolk, Virginia. In November 1949, she joined other units in cold water exercises in the Atlantic. During February and March 1950, the submarine participated in maneuvers in the Caribbean Sea.

=== 1950s ===
From August through November, she joined the Sixth Fleet in the Mediterranean Sea, visiting ports of Italy, France, and Sicily, before returning home. From December 1950 to April 1951 Sea Leopard was undergoing overhaul at the Philadelphia Naval Shipyard.

For the next two years, she operated in the Atlantic Ocean and Caribbean Sea, participating in fleet training exercises. In 1951 she recovered at sea the remains of Raymond Lewis of Brooklyn, New York, a victim of the FV Pelican disaster, which involved an overloaded party fishing boat that sank off the coast of Montauk on 1 September 1951. In September and October 1952, Sea Leopard participated in NATO operation "Emigrant," and then cruised in Bermuda waters, until entering the Charleston Naval Shipyard in December for overhaul. Returning to duty in April 1953, the submarine operated in the vicinity of Newfoundland and Iceland in operation "Mariner," before returning to warmer waters in the Caribbean.

Sea Leopard's second deployment to the Mediterranean took place in May and June 1954 and was followed by her participation in NATO exercise "New Broom II," in which she made successful simulated attacks on NATO convoys. The submarine entered the Portsmouth Naval Shipyard in October for a six-month overhaul. The yard work was followed by her participation in "LantPhibEx," as a member of forces opposing a simulated amphibious assault on the coast of North Carolina.

In February and March 1956, Sea Leopard, along with other units of SubRon 6, set sail for the Caribbean and operation "Springboard." She then returned to Norfolk for local operations until March 1957, when she again joined the Sixth Fleet in the Mediterranean. In June, she participated in festivities celebrating the 50th anniversary of the Netherlands Submarine Force at Rotterdam, before sailing to Charleston, South Carolina, for an overhaul. Upon its completion in January 1958, Sea Leopard joined operation "Springboard" in the Caribbean and then returned to Norfolk for local operations. Joining Task Group Alfa, she participated in operations to develop antisubmarine warfare tactics and readiness, until undergoing restricted availability at Charleston Naval Shipyard (August to October 1959) to install a new high capacity battery.

=== 1960s ===
During 1960, Sea Leopard operated in the Atlantic in training exercises and fleet operations until 23 October, when she entered Philadelphia Naval Shipyard for overhaul. Following completion in April 1961, she returned to Norfolk and operated locally until 19 August when she joined Task Force 69 in the Mediterranean to participate in NATO operation "Checkmate" and visit Rota, Spain; Malta and Naples, Italy. On 3 October, Sea Leopard sailed from the Mediterranean for northern Europe and NATO operation "Devil Spread."

Arriving back at Norfolk on 10 November, she again joined Task Group Alfa for antisubmarine warfare (ASW) training until February 1963. She then participated in operation "Springboard" in the Caribbean. Immediately following the loss of Thresher on 10 April 1963, she conducted an at-sea helicopter transfer of a crew member who had left the Thresher just three weeks earlier. In July, Sea Leopard rejoined Task Group Alfa, until entering Norfolk Naval Shipyard on 16 December for an overhaul. In October 1964, after refresher training out of New London, Connecticut, the submarine returned to Norfolk to resume normal duties as a unit of SubRon 6, providing ASW services to units of the Second Fleet.

In March 1965, she joined Task Group Alfa, deploying to the Mediterranean and then returning to the Atlantic to participate in ASW exercises with that group until 24 November 1966. On 27 December, Sea Leopard entered Norfolk Naval Shipyard for overhaul. In July 1967, she conducted type training with submarines Sablefish (SS-303) and Cubera (SS-347). The remainder of 1967 was spent in the Norfolk area.

In 1968, Sea Leopard participated in exercises "Aged Daddy V" and "Rugby Match," and joined the search for the ill-fated submarine Scorpion (SSN-589). From July through October, she operated with the Sixth Fleet in the Mediterranean, and upon her return, she remained at Norfolk for the rest of the year.

On 2 June 1969, Sea Leopard deployed on a special operation to the North Atlantic, returning to Norfolk on 15 August to operate in that area until entering Philadelphia Naval Shipyard on 17 January 1970 for a six-month overhaul. In October, she participated in operation "Eyebolt," and then remained at Norfolk until getting underway early in January 1971 to participate in operation "Springboard" in January and February. From 18 May to 2 September, Sea Leopard was deployed to the Mediterranean; and, following her return to Norfolk, she was deployed from Key West in the early 1970s.

== Brazilian Navy Service ==
Sea Leopard was decommissioned and struck from the Navy list on 27 March 1973 and transferred to Brazil, where she was commissioned into the Marinha do Brasil as Bahia (S-12). She inherited both her name and hull number from an earlier Bahia, ex-USS Plaice (SS-390), which the Brazilians converted into a museum ship in 1972. This later Bahia served as an active duty submarine in the Brazilian Navy until 1993 when she was relegated to dockside training duties.

Bahia was sold for scrap in 1998. Her sail is preserved at the National Maritime Museum in São Francisco do Sul, Brazil.
