= Mad T Party =

Former nighttime theme park event

Mad T Party Band

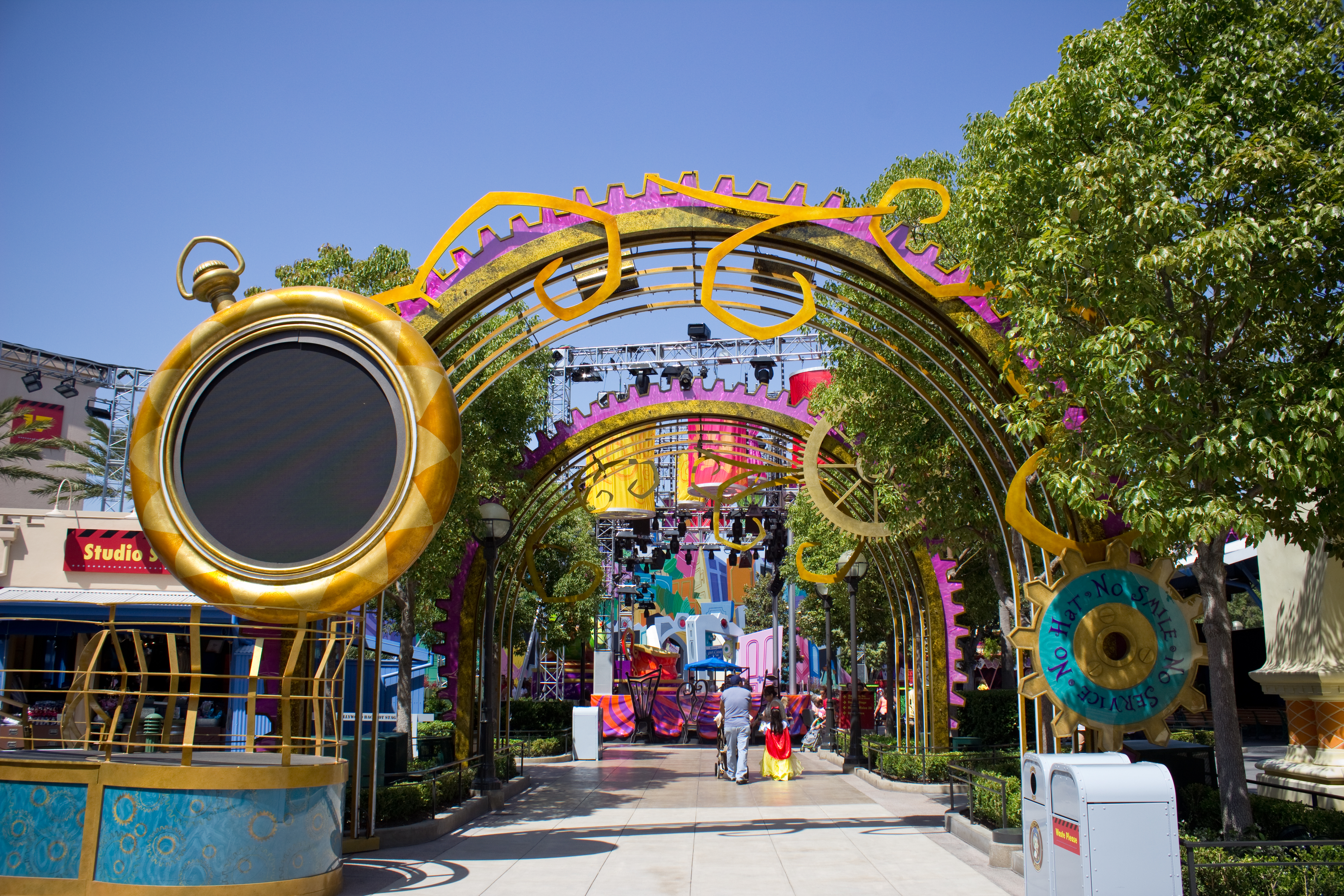

Disney California Adventure
- Area: Hollywood Land
- Status: Closed
- Opening date: May 26, 2012 (Original); May 22, 2015 (Updated)
- Closing date: December 1, 2014 (Original); March 31, 2016 (Updated)
- Replaced: ElecTRONica (original); Freeze the Night! A Family Dance Party (updated)
- Replaced by: Freeze the Night! A Family Dance Party (original); Disney California Adventure Food & Wine Festival (updated)

Ride statistics
- Attraction type: Nighttime event
- Designer: Walt Disney Imagineering
- Theme: Alice in Wonderland
- Music: Trance, new wave, dance-pop

The Mad T Party Band was a nighttime event at Disney California Adventure at the Disneyland Resort in Anaheim, California. Anchored in the Hollywood Studios subsection of the Hollywood Land section of the park, Mad T Party was premiered on May 26, 2012. The event, which succeeded ElecTRONica, was inspired by Tim Burton's Alice in Wonderland.

Mad T Party originally set to closed on November 30, 2014. However, On December 5, 2014, it was announced that its temporary replacement would be Freeze the Night! A Family Dance Party, inspired by Disney's Frozen. Freeze the Night! ran on January 7 through April 30, 2015. On February 13, 2015, it was announced that the updated version of Mad T Party would return on May 22, 2015, as part of the 60th Anniversary Diamond Celebration. Mad T Party's final night of performance was March 30, 2016. Jammin' on the Backlot replaced the event. Its final operating day was September 5, 2016. Although the band made a surprise appearance as the opening act for the Disney Experiences Panel at D23: The Ultimate Disney Fan Event at the Honda Center on August 10, 2024.

== Music ==
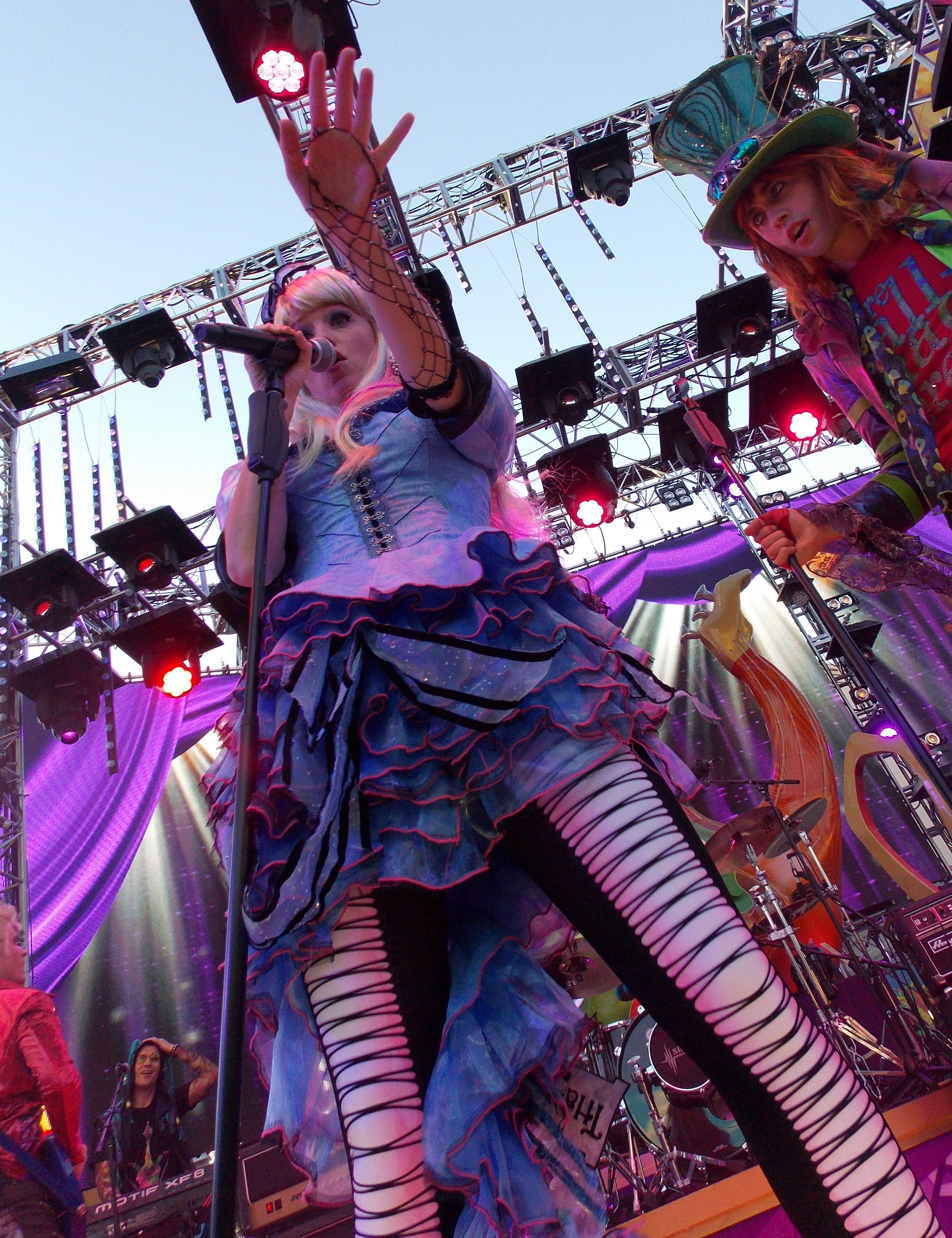
Alice performed on the main stage.

The music played at the Mad T Party Band was mainly dance music. Various types of music were played such as electro house, progressive house, and EDM. Guests of all ages were encouraged to dance at this event.

The Mad T Party Band included two lead vocalists: an Alice and a Mad Hatter. Both the Alice and the Mad Hatter roles were rotated through a roster of performers, which changed every night.

The event featured six original DJ characters: DJ Adam Auburn, VIND3R, formerly DJ Michael Paul, DJ Jason Jass, DJ Missy Beltran, DJ David Bullock, and DJ Wendy Walker.

== Activities ==
Located in between Mickey's PhilharMagic and Monsters, Inc. Mike & Sulley to the Rescue!, Mad T Party contained numerous activities.

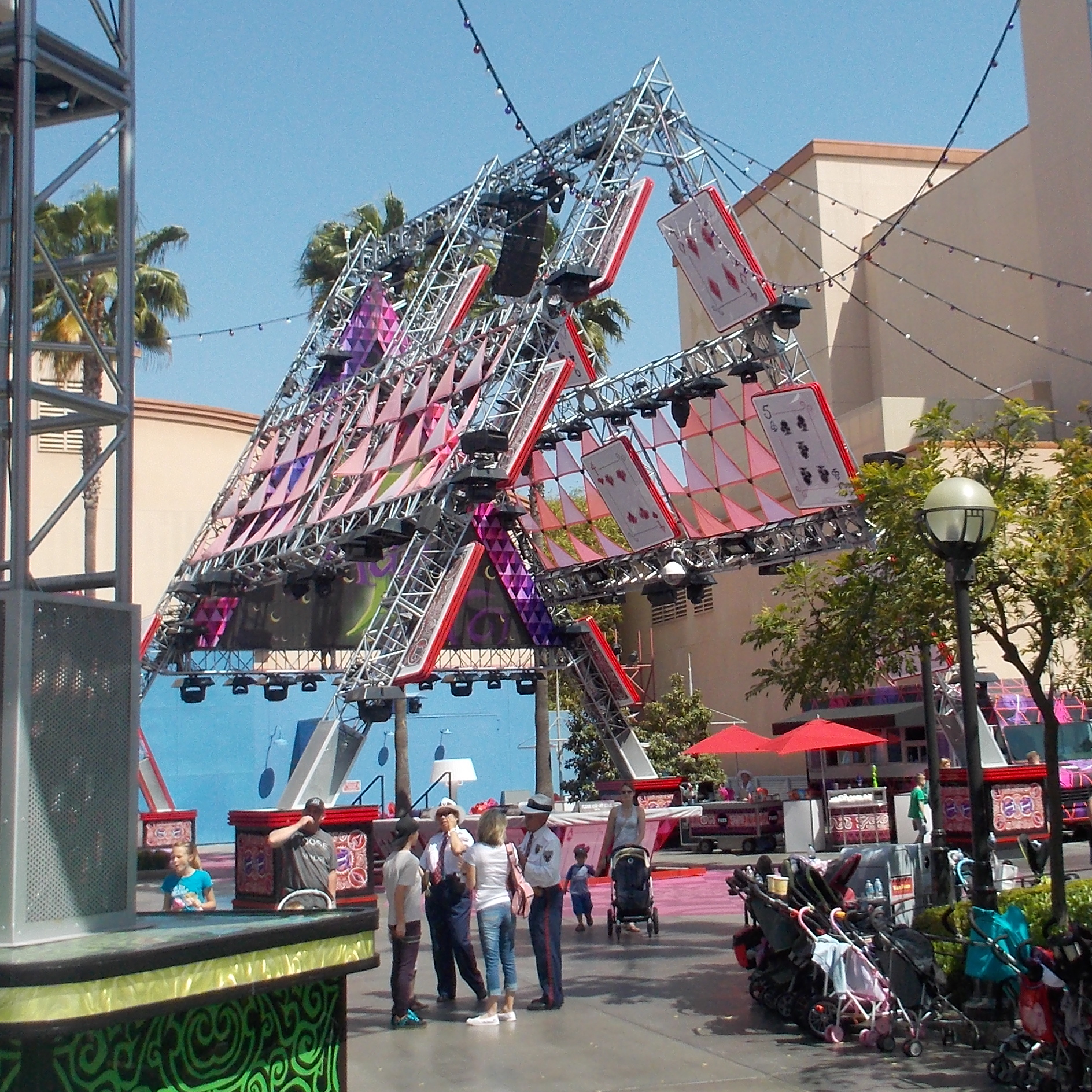
House of Cards

=== House of Cards ===
The House of Cards was where the event's other acts are found. Performers included the Hottest Deck in Town who are professional dancers and an aerial act by The Dueling Queens. The stage's overhead structure was designed to look like its namesake – an LED-lit house of cards.

In keeping with the eclectic setting of the film, music by contemporary artists such as Bruno Mars, The Beatles, Maroon 5, Prince, No Doubt, and Lady Gaga were played.

=== Drink Me ===
Drink Me was a cocktail club that offered alcoholic and non-alcoholic beverages with names that are appropriate to the Alice in Wonderland theme, e.g., the Croquette Tini (which the staff described as a Cosmo), the Mad Hat-ito, and the Mad Long Island-Iced T. On February 15, 2016, it was announced that Drink Me would be removed shortly after closing. The entire building has now been demolished.

=== Mad Arcade ===
Different from Flynn's Arcade at ElecTRONica, the Mad Arcade hosted interactive games based on characters from the film. There were games such as Whack-A-Hat and Bandersnatch Ball.

== See also ==
- 2012 in amusement parks
