= Chuck Martini =

Moroccan-English footballer

Personal information
- Full name: Chuck Martini
- Birth name: Choukri Moussaddik
- Date of birth: 23 February 1970 (age 56)
- Place of birth: Meknes, Morocco
- Height: 1.80 m (5 ft 11 in)
- Position: Goalkeeper

Youth career
- Tottenham Hotspur
- 1988–1990: Wimbledon

Senior career*
Years	Team	Apps	(Gls)
1990–1996	Wycombe Wanderers	2	(0)
1992	→ Slough Town (loan)	3	(0)
1996	→ Slough Town (loan)	2	(0)
1996	Barnet	0	(0)
1996	Dallas Sidekicks	6	(0)
1996	Indianapolis Twisters	6	(0)
1996–1997	Columbus Invaders	25	(0)
1997–1998	Connecticut Wolves	31	(0)
1998–2001	King's Lynn Town		
2001	Farnborough		
2001	Hendon		
2001	Sutton United		
2002	Maidstone United		
2002	Dartford		
2002–2003	Bromley		
2003–2004	Folkestone Invicta		
2004–2005	Windsor & Eton		
2005	Kingstonian	14	(0)
2005–2006	Worthing		
2006–2007	Dulwich Hamlet		
2007	Molesey		

Managerial career
- 2007–2010: Godalming Town
- 2010–2013: Walton & Hersham
- 2013–: Muscat Football Academy
- * Club domestic league appearances and goals

Choukri Moussaddik (Arabic: شكري مصدق; born 23 February 1970), also known as Chuck Martini (Arabic: تشاك مارتيني), is a Moroccan former footballer who played as a goalkeeper.

== Club career ==
Born in Meknes, Morocco, Martini moved to England at the age of three. He started his career with the Tottenham Hotspur academy, before spending two years with Wimbledon. In 1990, he signed for Wycombe Wanderers, but would only go on to make two appearances in all competitions for the Chairboys. While at Wycombe Wanderers, he also represented them in five-a-side football. He had two short spells with Slough Town in 1992 and 1996, before leaving permanently for Barnet in 1996.

After a few months at Barnet, and failing to make an appearance, he moved to the United States, where he played for the Dallas Sidekicks, Indiana Twisters, Columbus Invaders and Connecticut Wolves.

On his return to England, Martini signed for King's Lynn Town in late 1998. In his two years with the club, he set a new clean sheet record – 11 hours and 45 minutes. He also spent time with Farnborough and Hendon in 2001, before spending the second half of the year with Sutton United, being released in December. Spells with Folkestone Invicta and Dartford followed. He joined Maidstone United in March 2002, signing a three-match deal with the Stones. Later in the same year, he moved to Bromley, before his release in July 2003.

He had a short stint with Kingstonian in 2005, spent time with Worthing and Dulwich Hamlet, and then was at Molesey in 2007, following the departure of Steve Beeks.

== International career ==
There are numerous mentions of Martini as a "Moroccan international", with Martini himself saying he felt "blessed" to represent Morocco at the international level on four occasions. According to one source, he played 17 games for the Morocco under-21 team and four times for the full national team.

== Managerial career ==
Martini served as manager of Godalming Town between 2007 and 2010, in his first season in charge, saving Godalming Town from relegation and steering them to their highest step 4 league position. 2010 was arguably Godalming Town best ever season in their entire history finishing in the Ryman League 1 play off final and reaching FA Troaphy 4th round along with FA Cup 3rd round Qualifier he then switched to Walton & Hersham, spending three years with the Swans.

He has also served as head coach of the Muscat Football Academy in Oman.
