= Bahiyyih =

Bahiyyih is a given name. Notable people with the name include:

- Bahíyyih Khánum (1846–1932), the daughter of Bahá'u'lláh, the founder of the Baháʼí Faith
- Bahiyyih Nakhjavani (fl. 1962), a Persian writer born in Uganda, educated in the United Kingdom and the United States, living in France
- Huening Bahiyyih (born 2004), a member of the South Korean girl group Kep1er
