= Bohai Township =

Bohai Township 渤海乡
- Rural Township
- Bóhǎi Xiāng
- Location in Hebei Location in China
- Coordinates: 39°59′29″N 119°48′02″E
- Country: People's Republic of China
- Province: Hebei
- Prefecture-level city: Qinhuangdao
- District: Shanhaiguan

Area
  - Total: 20.38 km^{2} (7.87 sq mi)

Population (2010)
  - Total: 10,859
  - Density: 532.7/km^{2} (1,380/sq mi)
- Time zone: UTC+8 (China Standard)

Bohai Township (Chinese: 渤海乡; pinyin: Bóhǎi Xiāng) is a rural township located in Shanhaiguan District, Qinhuangdao, Hebei, China. According to the 2010 census, Bohai Township had a population of 10,859, including 5,788 males and 5,071 females. The population was distributed as follows: 1,363 people aged under 14, 8,792 people aged between 15 and 64, and 704 people aged over 65.

== See also ==
- List of township-level divisions of Hebei
