= Kukar Pind =

- village
- Location in Punjab, India
- Coordinates: 31.2599073°N 75.6623804°E
- Country: India
- State: Punjab
- District: Jalandhar
- Block: Jalandhar (East)

Languages
  - Official: Punjabi
- Time zone: UTC+5:30 (IST)

Kukar Pind is a large village in Jalandhar, Punjab, India.
