= Bahia Mardini =

Syrian journalist

Bahia Al Mardini (Arabic: بهية مارديني) is a Syrian Researcher in International Law, PHD in Law, MA degree from Northampton University in England, writer, and journalist.

She has been known as an activist, and she has worked in the field of human rights and the promotion of democracy, dialogue and pluralism in Syria and the Arab countries.

She has a poetry book printed and published in Damascus on 2004 entitled: Love has smell of bread published by Dar Canaan, And in 2020, she published a book entitled: About Syria, Words Looking For Letters.

She has many published articles, short stories, poetic poems, and television drama analyses, published by several Arabic newspapers and magazines in Syria, Kuwait and Egypt etc.

Also, she has participated in and established several Syrian regional and international organizations, movements, and alliances, including the National Organization for Human Rights in Syria, the Arab Committee for Freedom of Opinion and Expression and the Arab Coalition for Darfur.

Also she has worked extensively on the file of US and European Sanctions with UN and many international organizations, in preparation for the trial, from 2012 until 2017. This is what was published by Al-Arabiya, Donia Alwatan, Al-Manar channel, Syrians for change and Al-Malaf.

And she has always been demanding the abolition of the Supreme State Security Court in Syria and the Exceptional Courts, and she was subjected to many troubles and difficulties because of writing about the Kurdish Parties and the dissemination their statements, and also she was threatened by the Syrian government through more than one country, and also has been attacked. Such as the report about Kurdish detainees in Syrian Prisons 23 May 2006.

Mardini also defended for political prisoners in Syria, such as Syrian detainee Ahmad Ali Hussein al-Masalama, who died under torture in April 2005.

She also received an invitation from the European Parliament to speak about Syria as an independent journalist 16 January 2006.

And she was named in German journalist Christine Hilberg's report about censorship of online media in Syria in 2009.

Mardini took care of the situation of girls and women detained in Syrian prisons during the Syrian Revolution, such as the detention of a human rights lawyer Jihan Amin, and Ranim Matouk, a student at the Arts College and the daughter of human rights lawyer Khalil Maatouk, and Economic Researcher and Political Activist Amal Nasr wife of the Syrian politician Adnan Dbs.

She also contributed to covering and supporting the documentary film: Syria's Disappeared The Case Against Assad 2017, presented by Lindsay Duncan and written by Rollo Clark and presented in the British Parliament Hall at the end of March 2017. It tells the story of the detainees in the prisons of the Syrian government and has been officially presented in London, British Channel 4.

She achieved successes as an information media consultant in the National Coalition for Syrian Revolutionary and Opposition Forces, and she was the director of the media office of the opposition delegation in the peace negotiations in Geneva 2012.

She participated in hundreds of television interviews on international and Arab satellite channels to talk, comment and analyze the political and humanitarian situation in Syria between 2011 and 2017. She appeared on the BBC, Al Jazeera, Al Arabiya, France 24, Dubai TV and Al Hiwar, And other Arabic and international satellite channels.

Mardini also participated with journalist Hani Abu Oyash to prepare and discuss a series of important programs presented by Al Arabiya channel and presented by Mohammed Abu Obeid in documents entitled Security Report. part One, The second part, the third part, part Four, Fifth part.

Mardini has been a correspondent for Alhura TV in Damascus. Elaph newspapers for more than a decade, and has contributed to writing in several Arabic newspapers and websites, and contributed to the creation of many Syrian news and cultural websites.

More than thirty press articles (reports) in English were published by many websites, such as Al-Jazeera Net, about human rights issues in Syria, particularly Syrian detainees and displaced persons. It also dealt with many political issues related to resolving the Syrian political crisis.
