= Elio Martinis =

Italian partisan and paleontologist

Furore Elio Martinis
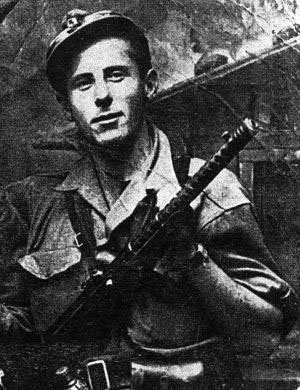
- An image of Elio taken during his service as a partisan, between 1944 and 1945
- Born: 26 October 1921; Ampezzo
- Died: 11 December 2013 (aged 92); Tolmezzo
- Military career
- Allegiance: Italian Resistance Movement
- Service years: 1940 – 1943; 1944 – 1945
- Rank: Commander
- Unit: Brigata Garibaldi
- Known for: His role in the Republic of Carnia and his fight against Kosakenland
- Conflicts: Italian Campaign (World War II)
- Awards: Bronze Medal for Military Valor

Elio Martinis (Ampezzo, 26 October 1921 – Tolmezzo, 11 December 2013) was an Italian partisan and paleontologist who led the "Leone Nassivera" Battalion of the Brigata Garibaldi's Carnia branch alongside Mario Candotti and Ciro Nigris. He was significant in the history of the Republic of Carnia and the fall of Kosakenland (A Cossack-Caucasian led autonomous entity under Nazi supervision).

== Biography ==
=== Early years ===
Elio Martinis was born in Ampezzo, Friuli-Venezia-Giulia, on 26 October 1921. His father was a mason, whilst his mother was a farmer. After primary school he dropped his studies.

=== Service in the Royal Italian Army ===
In late 1940 he received a letter stating that he was enlisted in the army. On 3 January 1941, in Gemona del Friuli, where he was selected as a radio telegraphist in the Royal Italian Army. He stayed in Gemona del Friuli for two months before being moved in the Tolmezzo regiment located in Tarvisio. After another 2 months in Camporosso, his unit was divided in two; Half of it went to fight on the Russian Front, whilst the other part was sent in other areas. He was part of the latter half, and was sent to Montenegro.

On November 1942, he was relocated in France, nearby the Little St Bernard Pass, before being relocated once more, this time, in Haute-Savoie. By early September 1943, he was stationed nearby Podbrdo, Slovenia.

After hearing of the Armistice of Cassibile from local radios as he roamed around the inhabited area between Tarcento and Artegna, he went back to his unit and convinced them to leave their post. They later escaped to Qualso.

=== Partisan career ===
Despite initially living relatively normally up until then, after the murder of Battista Candotti, his cousin, on 14 March 1944, he decided to become a partisan.

On 24 June 1945, his battalion's leader Mansueto Nassivera (alias “Leone”) died. Thus, soon after, by July 1944, he had already assumed a leadership role within the Brigate Garibaldi's Carnia division, and performed various attack on German outposts.

When on 1 August 1944 the Republic of Carnia was proclaimed, Elio had become one of its main protectors, leading the Leone Nassivera Battalion in protection of the republic. With the advent of Operation Waldläufer though, the republic collapsed.

The winter of 1944 and early 1945 was particularly harsh, however, Elio was one of the 200 partisans that kept up their activities despite the adverse weather conditions.

He was one of the protagonists of the Battle of Ovaro, one of the last battles of the Italian Campaign.

=== Activities after the war ===
After the war, for over 3 years, he fought against tuberculosis, overcoming it only in 1948.

Elio Martinis dedicated himself to various interests, such as paleontology. He was the one who discovered the "Thoracopterus martinisi" (which was named after him) and "Megalancosaurus preonensis".

He would go on to die on 11 December 2013, in Tolmezzo.
