= Martinis =

Martinis is an Italian surname. Notable people with the surname include:

- Apostolos Martinis (born 2001). Greek professional footballer
- Carla Martinis, Croatian operatic soprano
- Elio Martinis (1921 – 2013), talian partisan and paleontologist
- John Martinis, American politician
- John M. Martinis, American physicist and professor
- Susan A. Martinis, American biochemist

== See also ==
- Martini (surname)
