= Mimosa Martini =

Italian journalist (born 1961)

- Born: 12 March 1961 (age 65); Rome, Italy
- Occupations: Journalist, anchorwoman, writer

Mimosa Martini (born 12 March 1961) is an Italian journalist, anchorwoman, and writer. She is best known for her work as a war correspondent and anchorwoman for RAI and Mediaset broadcasting company.

== Life and career ==
Born 12 March 1961, in Rome, Martini began her career in the 1980s working with Gianni Bisiach on Rai Radio 1, and then with Sandro Curzi at Tg3. During this time she covered, among other topics, politics in the Soviet Union, the Nagorno-Karabakh conflict and the Gulf War. She worked for RAI public broadcasting service for ten years and collaborated with various newspapers.

With Enrico Mentana, in 1991, Martini was one of the founder members of TG5, working as a service chief and special foreign correspondent. In the following years, she became one of the most popular anchorwomen in Italy. For thirty years, Martini covered international politics and news, working in Mediaset up until 2021. As a war correspondent, she also worked in Afghanistan, Iraq and Iran. In 2003, she hosted with Maurizio Costanzo on Canale 5 the tv show Raccontando.

In 2003, the President of Italy Carlo Azeglio Ciampi appointed Martini a Knight of the Order of Merit of the Italian Republic.

In 2004, she published the novel Kashmir palace and in 2008 the essay Il volo del cuculo with Luana De Vita, both published by Nutrimenti.

Mimosa teaches at the Master's in Journalism and Radio and Television Journalism by Eidos.

== Books ==
- Mimosa Martini, Kashmir palace, Nutrimenti, 2004, ISBN 9788888389202.
- Mimosa Martini and Luana De Vita, Il volo del cuculo, Nutrimenti, 2008, ISBN 9788888389912.

== Honours ==
- Knight: Cavaliere Ordine al Merito della Repubblica Italiana: 2003
