= Brazilian ship Bahia =

Several ships of the Brazilian Navy have been named Bahia, after the state of Bahia:

- Brazilian monitor Bahia, a river monitor built in 1864 and stricken in 1894
- Brazilian cruiser Bahia, lead ship of the Bahia-class cruisers built in 1909 and sunk in 1945.
- Brazilian submarine Bahia (S-12, 1963), a Balao-class submarine, loaned from the United States in 1963 and decommissioned in 1972.
- Brazilian submarine Bahia (S-12, 1973), a Tench-class submarine, purchased from the United States in 1972 and decommissioned in 1993.
- Brazilian ship Bahia (G40), a Foudre-class landing platform dock purchased from France in 2015.
