= Bahia 22 =

Sailboat class

Development
- Designer: Philippe Harlé
- Location: France
- Year: 1983
- Builder: Jeanneau
- Role: Cruiser
- Name: Bahia 22

Boat
- Displacement: 1,852 lb (840 kg)
- Draft: 4.76 ft (1.45 m) with centerboard down

Hull
- Type: monohull
- Construction: fiberglass
- LOA: 22.74 ft (6.93 m)
- LWL: 18.04 ft (5.50 m)
- Beam: 7.94 ft (2.42 m)
- Engine: outboard motor

Hull appendages
- Keel: stub keel with centerboard
- Ballast: 620 lb (281 kg)
- Rudder: transom-mounted rudder

Rig
- Rig type: Bermuda rig
- I foretriangle height: 20.16 ft (6.14 m)
- J foretriangle base: 7.83 ft (2.39 m)
- P mainsail luff: 24.33 ft (7.42 m)
- E mainsail foot: 9.00 ft (2.74 m)

Sails
- Sailplan: fractional rigged sloop
- Mainsail area: 109.49 sq ft (10.172 m^{2})
- Jib/genoa area: 78.93 sq ft (7.333 m^{2})
- Total sail area: 188.41 sq ft (17.504 m^{2})

Racing
- PHRF: 177

The Bahia 22, also called the Bahia 23, is a French trailerable sailboat that was designed by Philippe Harlé as a pocket cruiser and first built in 1983.

== Production ==
The design was built by Jeanneau in France, between 1983 and 1987 but it is now out of production. The boat was also imported into the United States.

== Design ==
The Bahia 22 is a recreational keelboat, built predominantly of fiberglass, with wood trim. It has a fractional sloop rig, a raked stem, a plumb transom, a transom-hung rudder controlled by a tiller and a stub keel and centerboard or, optionally, fixed fin keel. It displaces 1,852 lb (840 kg) and carries 620 lb (281 kg) of ballast.

The centerboard version of the boat has a draft of 4.76 ft (1.45 m) with the centerboard extended and 1.31 ft (0.40 m) with it retracted, allowing operation in shallow water or ground transportation on a trailer.

The boat is normally fitted with a small 3 to 6 hp (2 to 4 kW) outboard motor for docking and maneuvering.

The design has sleeping accommodation for four people, with a double "V"-berth in the bow cabin and two straight settee berths in the main cabin. The galley is located amidships on both sides just aft of the bow cabin. The galley is equipped with a stove and a sink. Cabin headroom is 59 in (150 cm).

The design has a PHRF racing average handicap of 177 and a hull speed of 5.7 kn (10.6 km/h).

== Operational history ==
In a 2010 review Steve Henkel wrote, "the Bahia 23 (22' 9" LOA if you include both the outboard rudder and the bow pulpit in the length, but only 20' 4" LOD and 21" 11" LOA measured the conventional way) was built in France, and some few hulls were imported to the United States. As with many other French designs, a lot of thought has gone into the execution. Best features: The cabin arrangement is better than the average 20-footer's. Headroom is almost five feet ... [the s]ettee berths are both in the range of 7' 0" to 7' 6" long, A central table folds down, and also swings to one side for ingress and egress, or fore and aft for dining or other social activity. A companionway step can also serve as a bench at the table. On deck, lifeline stanchions have fixing points for beaching legs to hold the hull upright, in case you get caught on a falling tide. Worst features: The main hatch is hinged at the forward end, rather than sliding fore and aft, which limits headroom as well as visibility for those who like to stand in the companionway to look around."

== See also ==
- List of sailing boat types
