= .43 Spanish =

Rifle cartridge

.43 Spanish 11mm Spanish 11.15×57mmR Spanish Remington U.M.C. 43-77
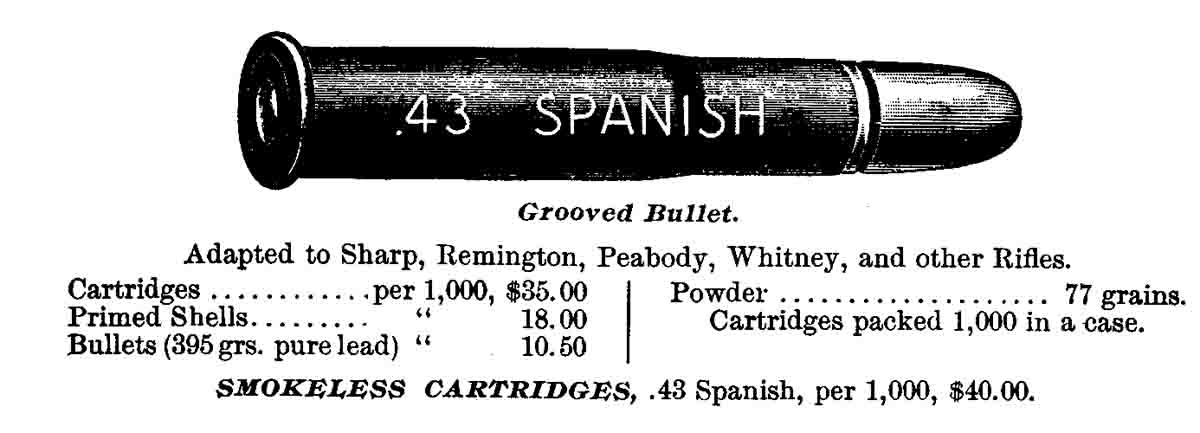
- Type: Rifle

Specifications
- Bullet diameter: .439 in (11.15 mm)
- Land diameter: .433 in (10.99 mm)
- Neck diameter: Rimmed, Bottleneck
- Shoulder diameter: .462 in (11.73 mm)
- Base diameter: .522 in (13.26 mm)
- Rim diameter: .629 in (15.98 mm)
- Rim thickness: .085 in (2.16 mm)
- Case length: 2.255 in (57.277 mm)
- Overall length: 2.845 in (72.263 mm)
- Primer type: Berdan

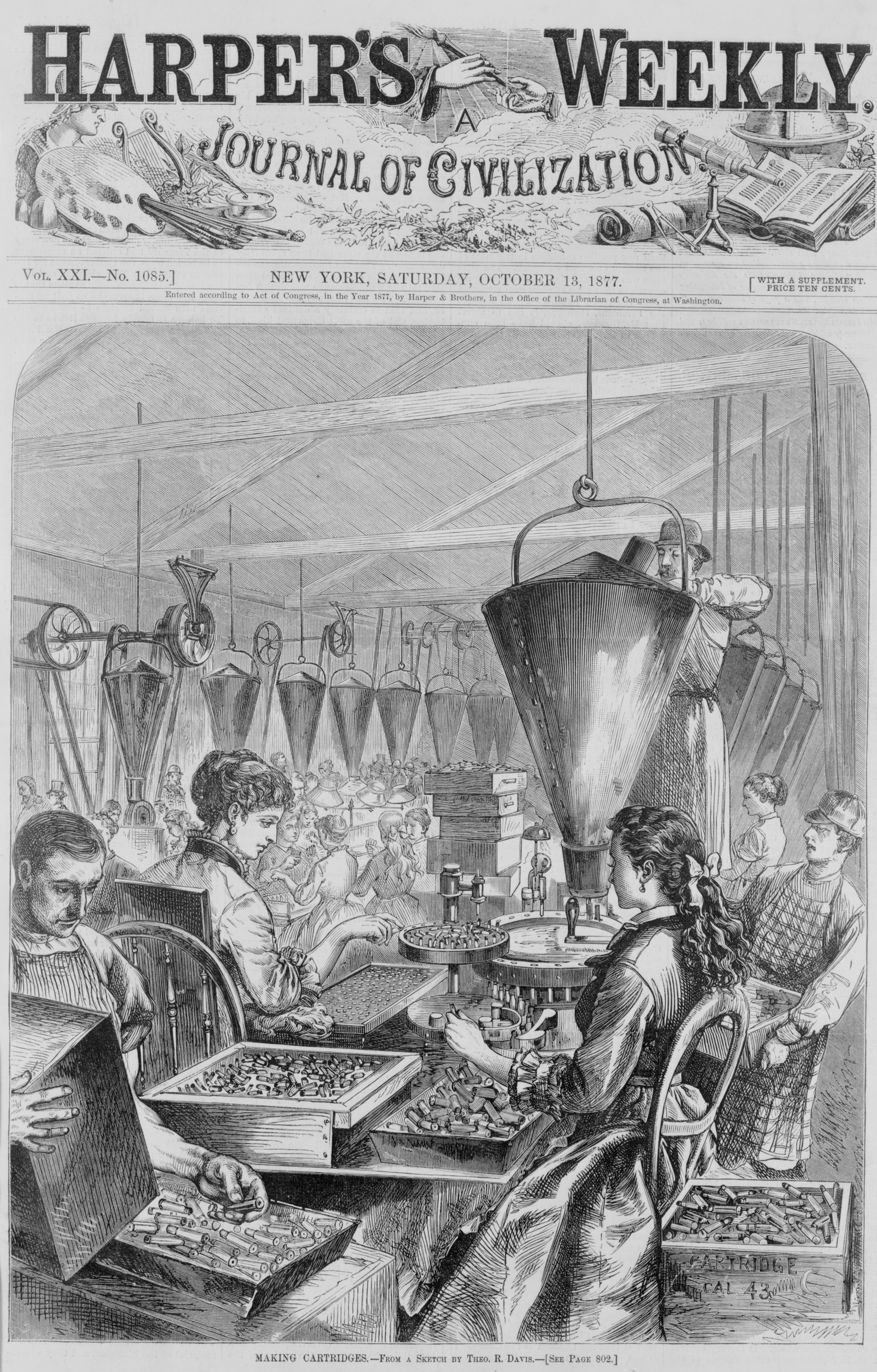
Making of .43 Spanish cartridges in Union Metallic Cartridge Co. factory at Bridgeport, Connecticut, 1877

The .43 Spanish / 11.15x57mmR was a centerfire rifle cartridge developed by Remington designers around 1867. It was used in early rolling block rifles that Remington manufactured for the government of Spain. The cartridge is also referred to as the .433 Spanish, "11mm Spanish", and identical cartridges for the US Peabody rifle were marked "U.M.C. 43-77".

== History ==
.43 Spanish rifle and tercerola, with its amunition. 3 pages

The .43 Spanish cartridge was produced after Spain purchased the newly invented rolling-block action single-shot rifle. The breech-loading firearm, which was marketed by Sam Remington, impressed the Spaniards after their own evaluation. In 1869, the Spanish government put in an order for 10,000 rifles. In addition to the firearms, they wanted their own cartridge and Remington developed the .43 Spanish. It was produced in two variants: the bottleneck case .43 Spanish (11.15x57mmR Remington Spanish) and the straight-wall case .43 Spanish Reformado (11.4x57mmR Reformado).

The cartridge was very similar to the .44-77 Sharps cartridge, except for the difference in the bore diameter. The Spanish military version of the cartridge was later upgraded in 1889 to a "heavier, brass-jacketed reformado bullet". While Remington stopped manufacturing the cartridge in 1918, its use in the United States became widespread after World War II because it was sold as a surplus.

The cartridge was also used, obscurely, in the 'Improved Lee' or 'Remington-Lee' rifle that was tested by the British in 1887. This extremely rare piece, only 300 were made, was made purely for trials of the Lee bolt and box magazine system, when the British military were looking to convert to a repeating rifle. A British rifle, the Lee-Burton and the last of the .40 Enfield-Martini line, was made by the Enfield armoury. Remington produced their own design with the latest of Lee's design features, chambered in .43 Spanish. The trials favoured the Lee magazine and this was adopted in Britain, although the calibre chosen was the new .303 British.

== "Poison bullet" ==
The .43 Spanish used a .439 in (11.2 mm) diameter bullet that weighed 396 gr (25.7 g). Its 1,280 ft/s (390 m/s) was powered by 74 gr (4.8 g) of black powder. Instead of solid lead bullet, the .43 Spanish used a brass-jacket bullet, which was considered unusual because cupronickel, gilding metal, and copper clad steel were preferred for bullet jackets during the period. It was also the reason why American soldiers suspected that the Spaniards used poison in their bullet during the Spanish-American War. It corroded in the tropics, producing a powdery pale green verdigris once they are exposed to high humidity or salty sea air over time. The brass component, however, improved bullet penetration.

== Firearms chambered ==
- Argentine Modelo 1879, rifle and carbine
- 1869 Spanish Peabody
- Whitney–Burgess–Morse lever-action rifle (military version)
- M1879 Remington–Lee

== Variants ==
There were three known variants of the .43 Spanish:

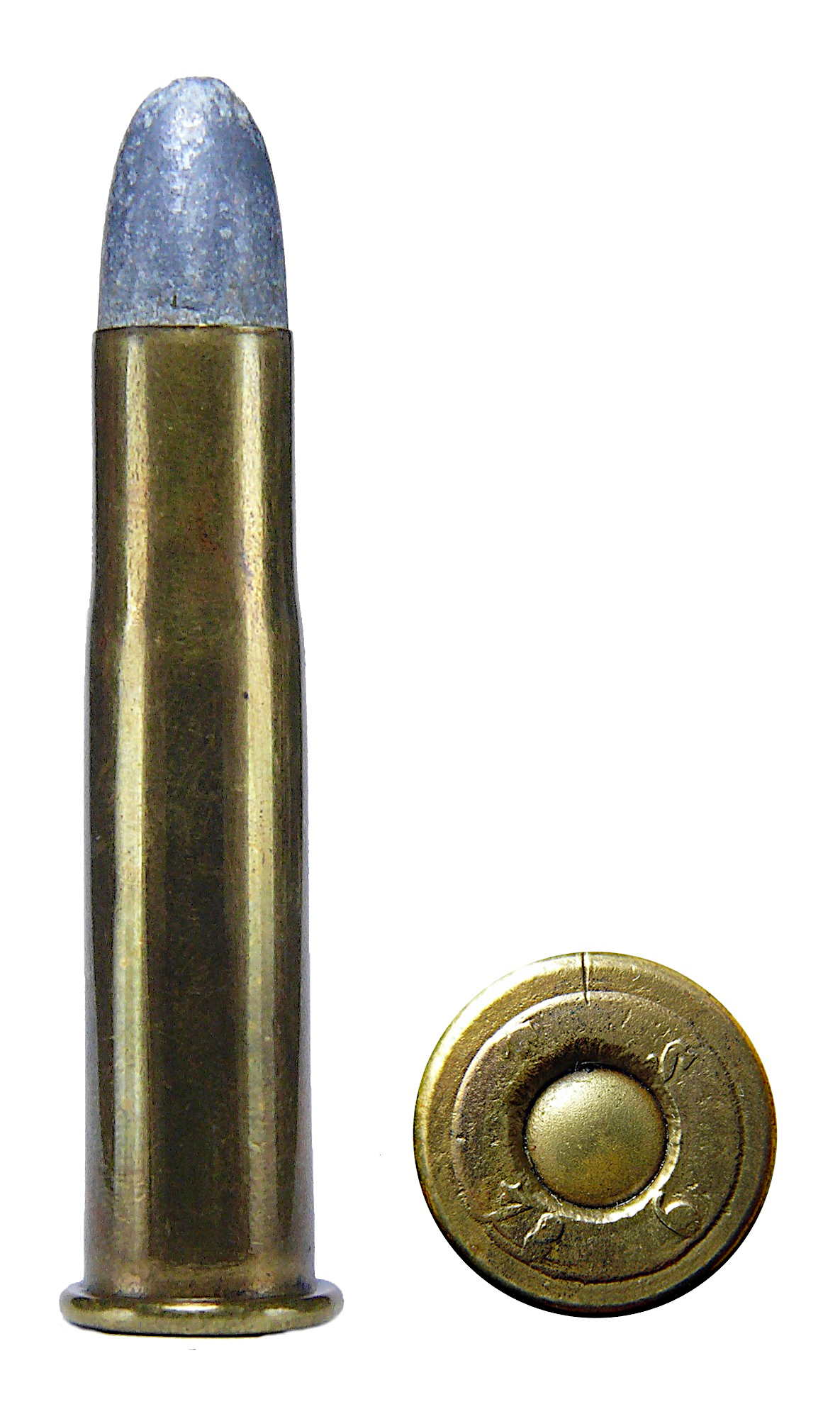
.43 Español

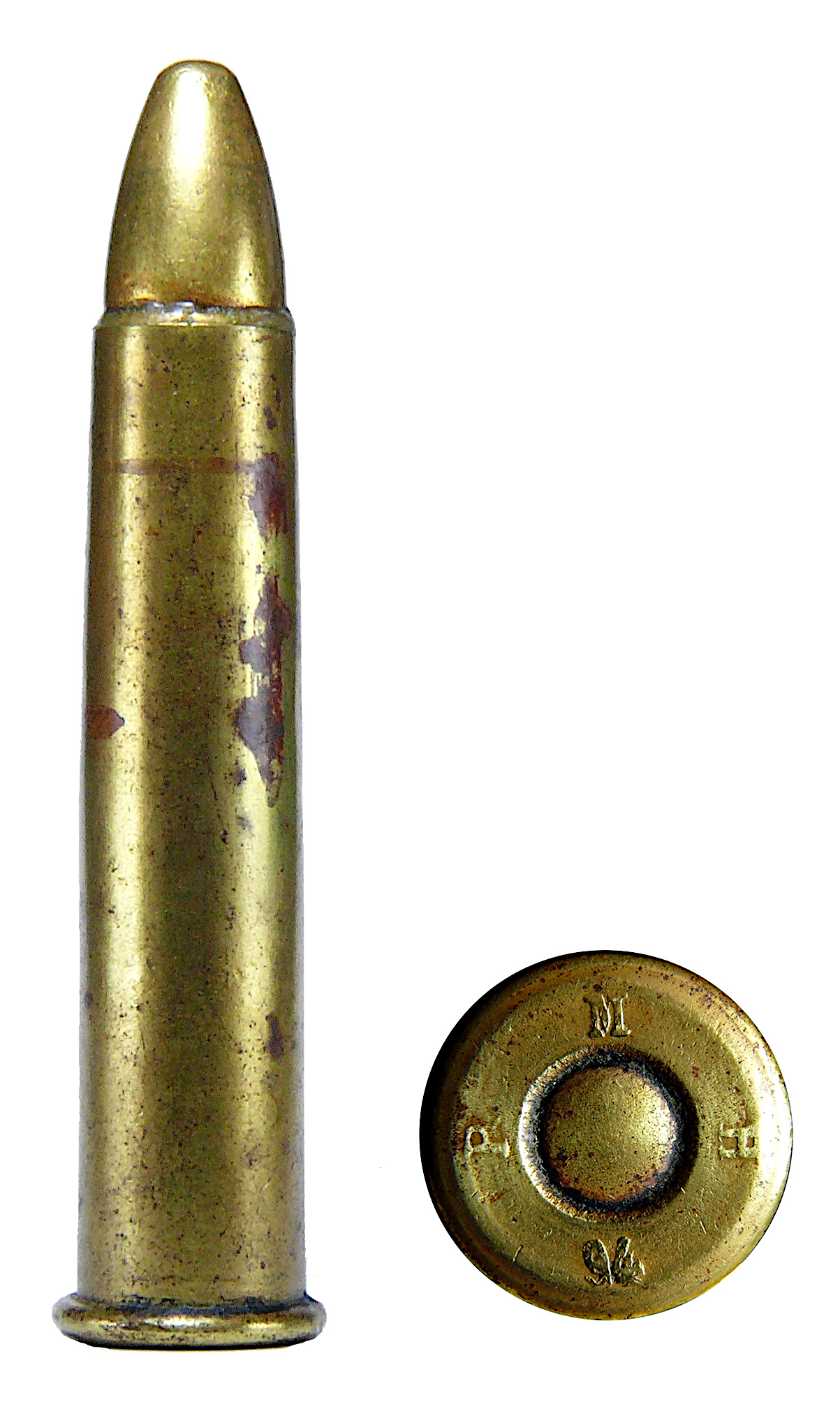
.43 Español Reformado

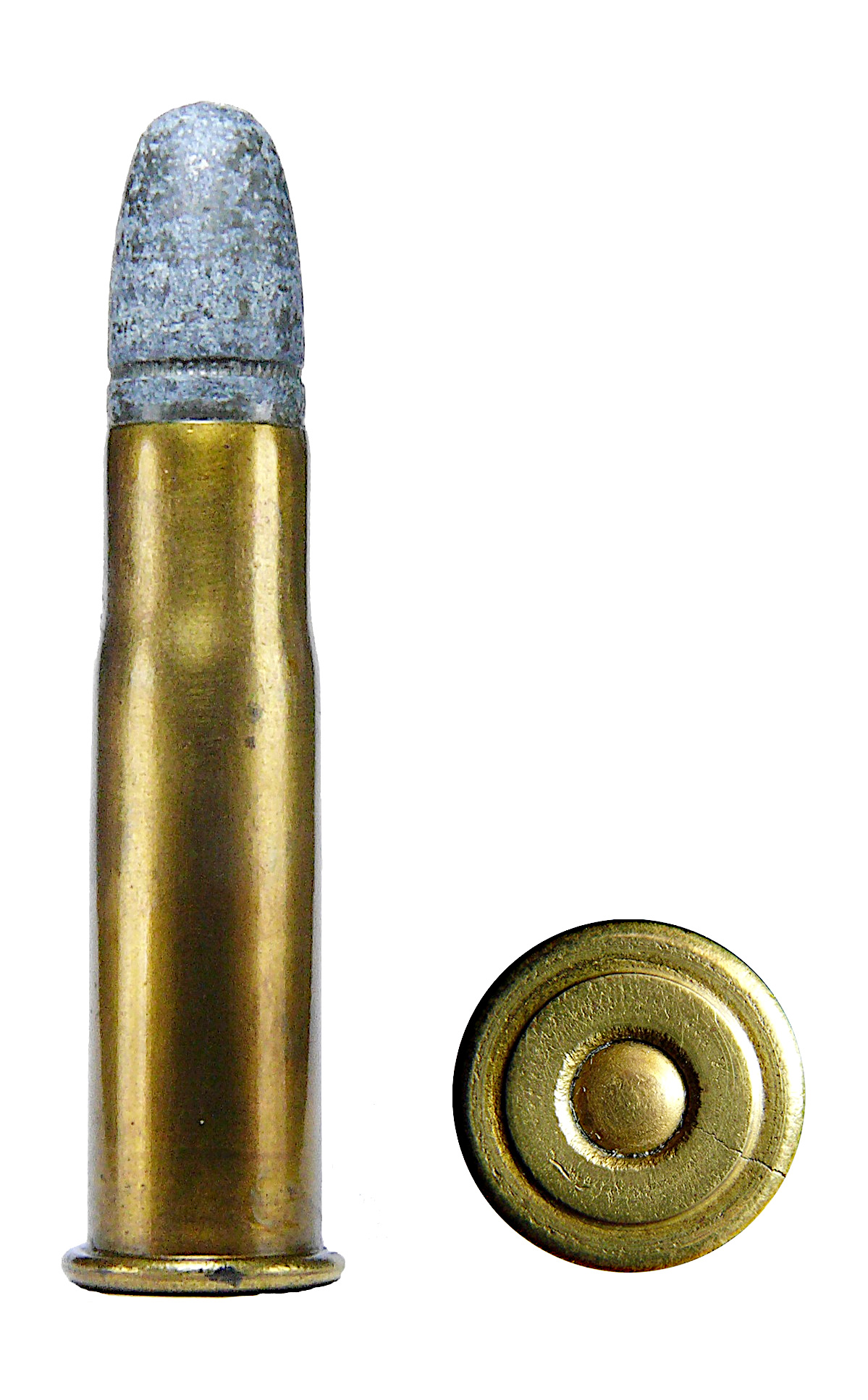
.43 Español Carbine Whitney

== Dimensions ==
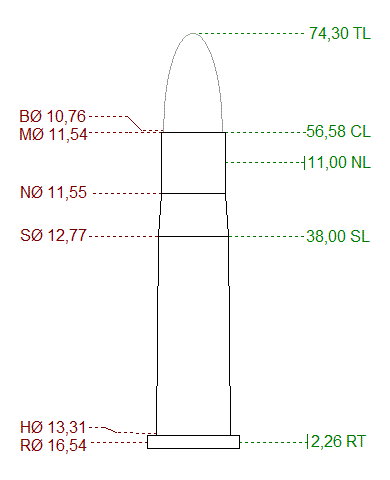
.43 Español

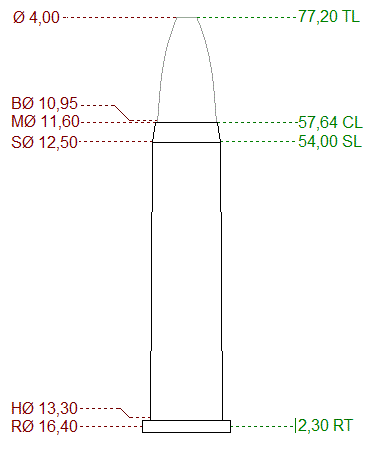
.43 Español Reformado

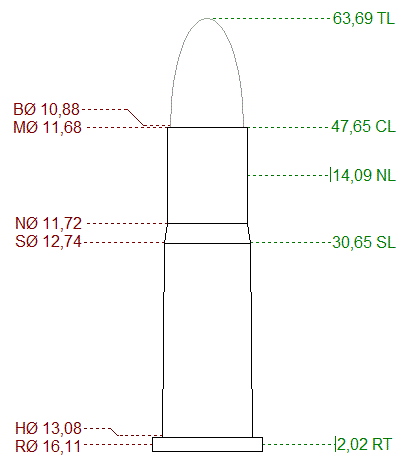
.43 Español Carbine Whitney

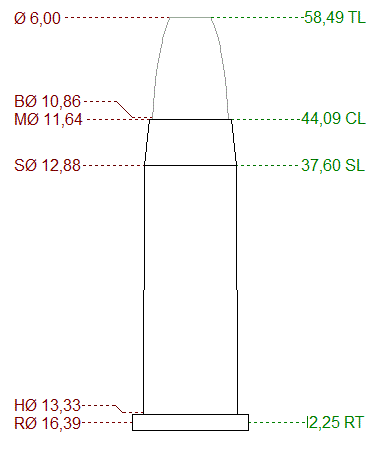
.43 Español Remington Carbine
