= Shanhaiguan, Qinhuangdao =

Shanhaiguan 山海关区 Shanhaikwan
- District
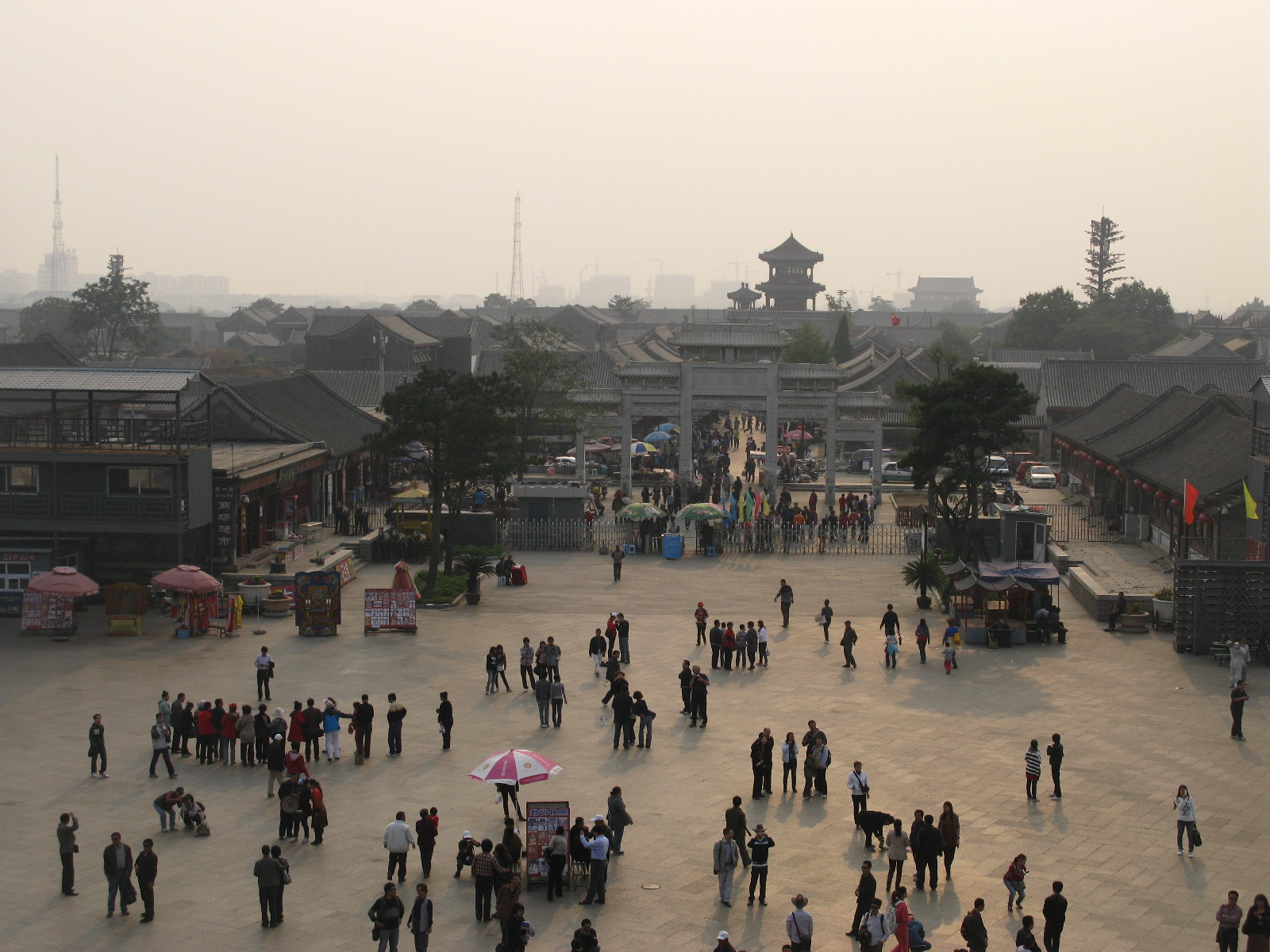
- Shanhaiguan Old Town

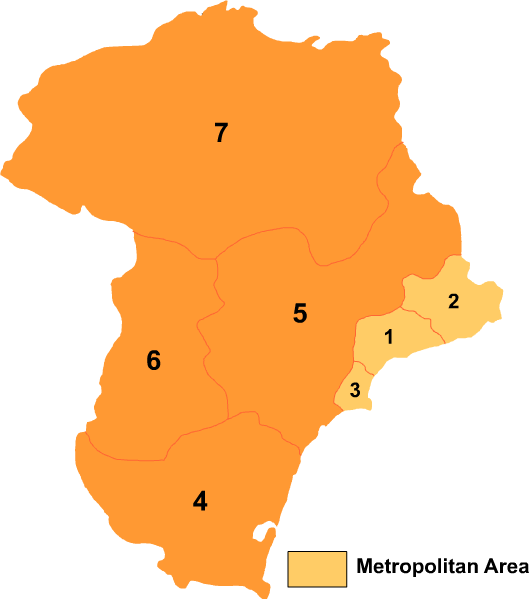
- Shanhaiguan is the area marked "2" on this map

- Location in Hebei
- Coordinates: 39°58′44″N 119°46′32″E
- Country: People's Republic of China
- Province: Hebei
- Prefecture-level city: Qinhuangdao
- Seat: Nanguan Subdistrict

Area
  - Total: 192 km^{2} (74 sq mi)
- Elevation: 2 m (6.6 ft)

Population (2020 census)
  - Total: 164,989
  - Density: 859/km^{2} (2,230/sq mi)
- Time zone: UTC+8 (China Standard)
- Postal code: 066200
- Area code: 0335
- Website: Shanhaiguan.gov.cn

Shanhaiguan District is a district of the city of Qinhuangdao, Hebei Province, China, named after the pass of the Great Wall within the district, Shanhai Pass. It is located 16.5 kilometres (10.3 mi) east of the city centre.

== Administrative divisions ==
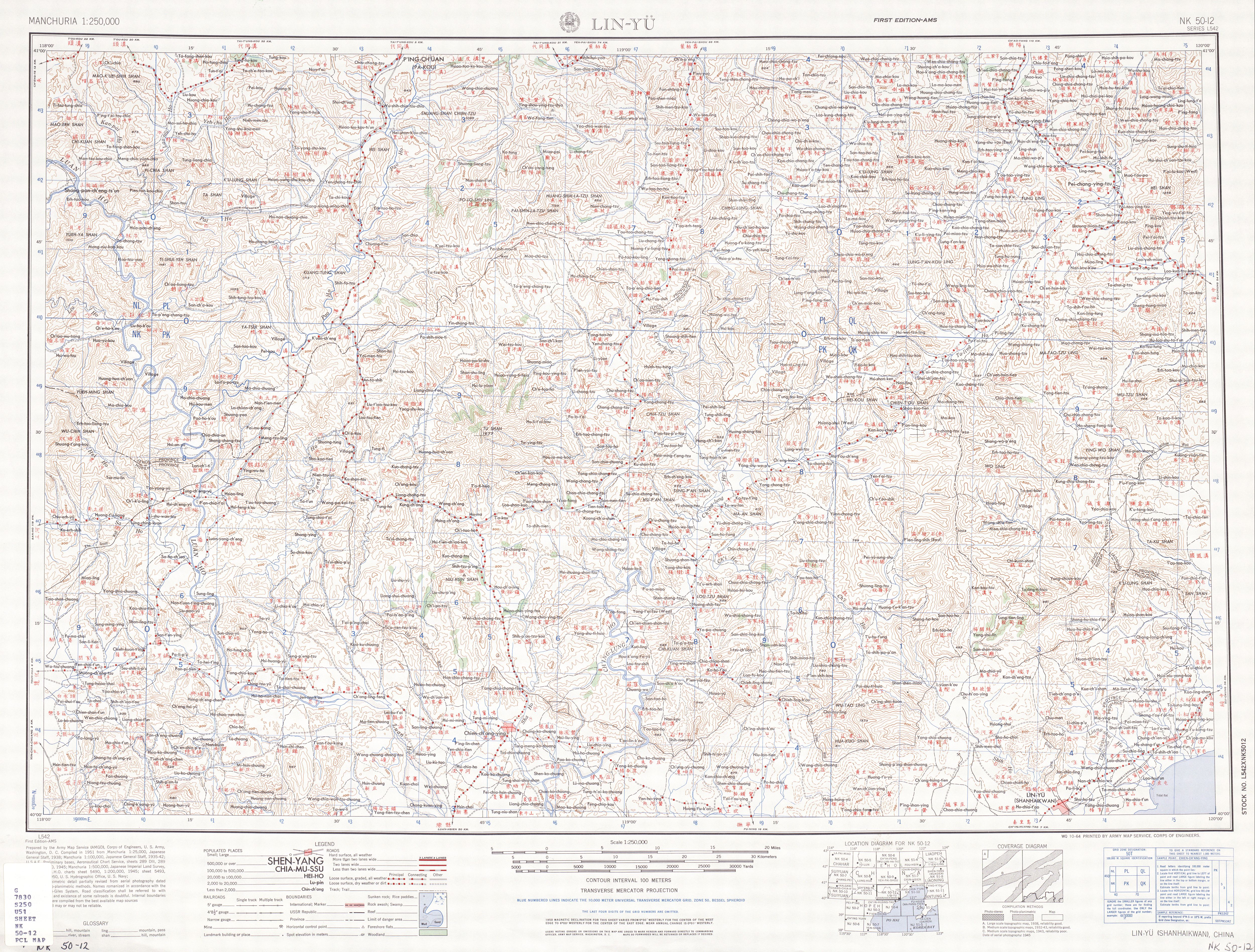
Shanhaiguan (labelled as LIN-YÜ (SHANHAIKWAN) 臨榆 (山海関)) (1951)

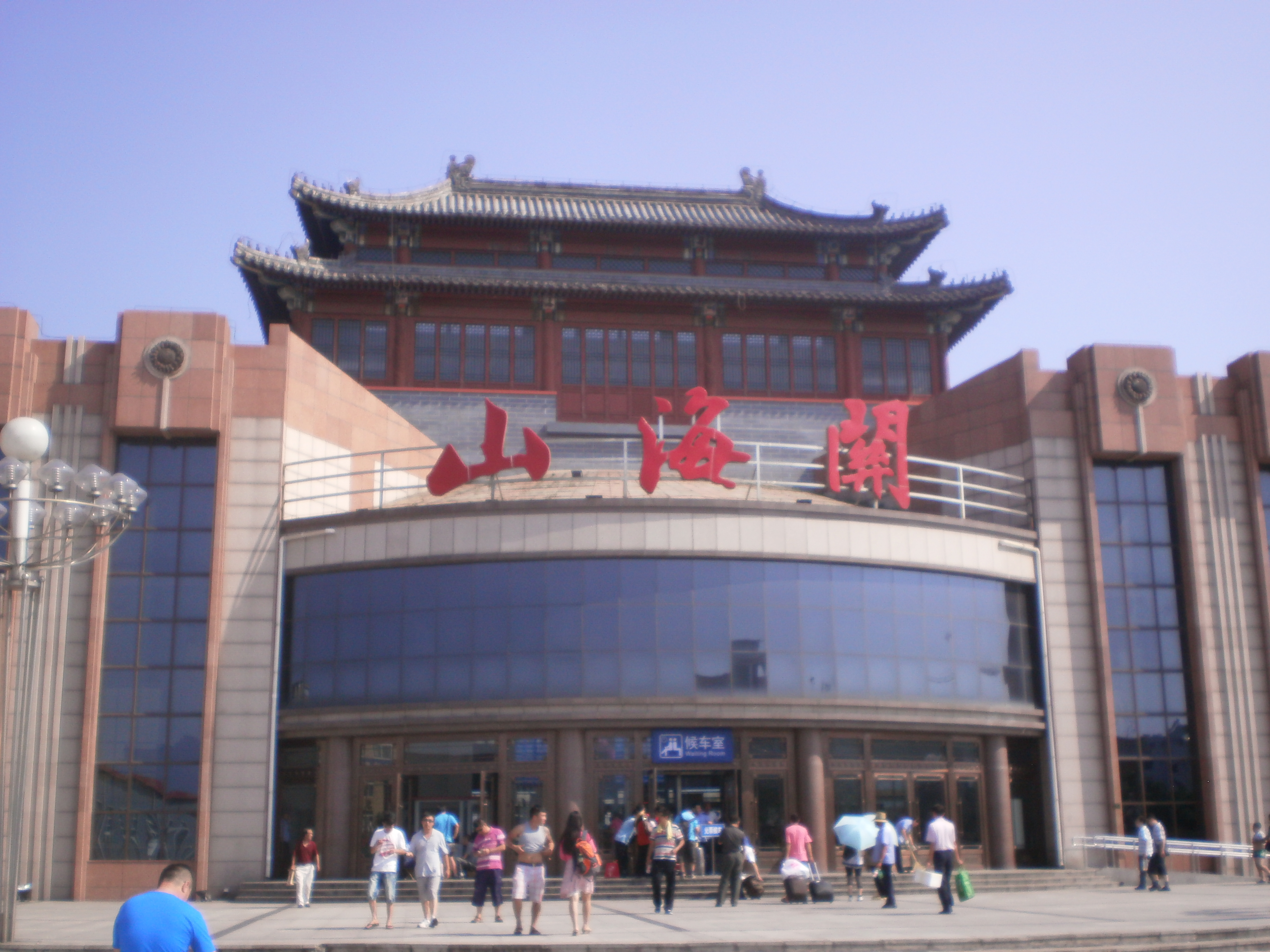
Shanhaiguan station

There are five subdistricts, three towns, and one township, Bohai Township (渤海乡), in the district.

=== Subdistricts ===
- Nanguan Subdistrict (南关街道)
- Dongjie Subdistrict (东街街道)
- Xijie Subdistrict (西街街道)
- Lunan Subdistrict (路南街道)
- Chuanchang Road Subdistrict (船厂路街道)

=== Towns ===
- Diyiguan (第一关镇)
- Shihe (石河镇)
- Mengjiang (孟姜镇)

== Climate ==
The climate is hot-summer humid continental with a monsoon pattern (Dwa). The annual average temperature is 11.2 °C (52.2 °F), with an average daily minimum temperature of 5.7 °C (42.3 °F) and an average daily maximum temperature of 16.8 °C (62.2 °F). The average annual precipitation is 613.2 millimetres (24.14 in).

Climate data for Shanhaiguan District (1991–2018 normals)
Month	Jan	Feb	Mar	Apr	May	Jun	Jul	Aug	Sep	Oct	Nov	Dec	Year
Mean daily maximum °C (°F)	0.4 (32.7)	3.4 (38.1)	9.8 (49.6)	17.9 (64.2)	24.5 (76.1)	28.0 (82.4)	30.0 (86.0)	30.1 (86.2)	26.0 (78.8)	19.3 (66.7)	9.5 (49.1)	2.4 (36.3)	16.8 (62.2)
Daily mean °C (°F)	−5.5 (22.1)	−2.5 (27.5)	4.1 (39.4)	11.9 (53.4)	18.6 (65.5)	22.0 (71.6)	25.8 (78.4)	25.6 (78.1)	20.3 (68.5)	13.2 (55.8)	3.9 (39.0)	−3.2 (26.2)	11.2 (52.1)
Mean daily minimum °C (°F)	−11.3 (11.7)	−8.4 (16.9)	−1.6 (29.1)	5.9 (42.6)	12.7 (54.9)	17.7 (63.9)	21.7 (71.1)	21.0 (69.8)	14.6 (58.3)	7.0 (44.6)	−1.8 (28.8)	−8.8 (16.2)	5.7 (42.3)
Average precipitation mm (inches)	2.8 (0.11)	3.3 (0.13)	10.3 (0.41)	22.3 (0.88)	54.3 (2.14)	75.5 (2.97)	168.1 (6.62)	180.0 (7.09)	57.2 (2.25)	23.8 (0.94)	12.3 (0.48)	3.3 (0.13)	613.2 (24.15)
Source: Climate of Shanhaiguan District（1961-2018）
