= Khalil Maatouk =

Syrian lawyer

Khalil Maatouk (Arabic: خليل معتوق) is a Syrian lawyer and human rights defender. Arrested at a roadblock in October 2012, he has been missing since then.

== Biography ==
Khalil Maatouk, a Syrian lawyer of Christian faith has defended many Syrian political prisoners, including human rights defender Mazen Darwish. The communist activist Mazen Adi and the president of the Syrian League for Human Rights Abdel Karim Rihaoui. In 2004, Khalil Maatouk worked as an observer for Amnesty International in Iran.

Khalil Maatouk is also the president of the Syrian Center for the Defense of Prisoners of conscience.

His position as director of the "Syrian Center for Legal Studies and Research" earned him a travel ban from 2005 to 2011.

His daughter, a student, was also arrested and held for 2 months in 2014, by military security.

== Forced Disappearance ==
On October 2, 2012, Khalil Maatouk was arrested with his friend and assistant, Mohammed Zaza (also spelled Mohammed Thatha), when they were on their way to work in Damascus. They were stopped and arrested at a government check point. For his severe lung disease Khalil Maatouk could not move around alone, his colleague was driving him. For a long time after their arrest no one was able to find anything about them.

== Imprisonment ==
Syrian authorities have always denied the detention of Khalil Maatouk. However, former detainees have testified that they have seen him in different prisons. Unofficial sources report that Maatouk was notably imprisoned within Branch 285 of state security near Damascus, then in the Aviation Safety Branch in Damascus, while his health conditions were in a worrying state. He was last seen in September 2013, in Military Security Branch 235, Damascus, known as the Palestine Branch.

During his detention, several NGOs and diplomats called for his release, reminding Bashar al-Assad of their fears for his health.
