= Friedrich Martini (legal scholar) =

Friedrich Martini (died 1630) was a German legal scholar and lecturer at the University of Ingolstadt and the University of Freiburg. He was born in Hainstadt near Offenbach, and died in 1630 in Freiburg.

== Sources ==
- Müller, Winfried (1983). "Martini, Friedrich". In Bosl, Karl (ed.). Bosls bayerische Biographie. Regensburg: Pustet. p. 509.
- Prantl, Carl von (1884). "Martini, Friedrich". Allgemeine Deutsche Biographie. Allgemeine Deutsche Biographie. Vol. 20. Leipzig: Duncker & Humblot. pp. 508–9.
