= Masawaih al-Mardini =

Syrian physician

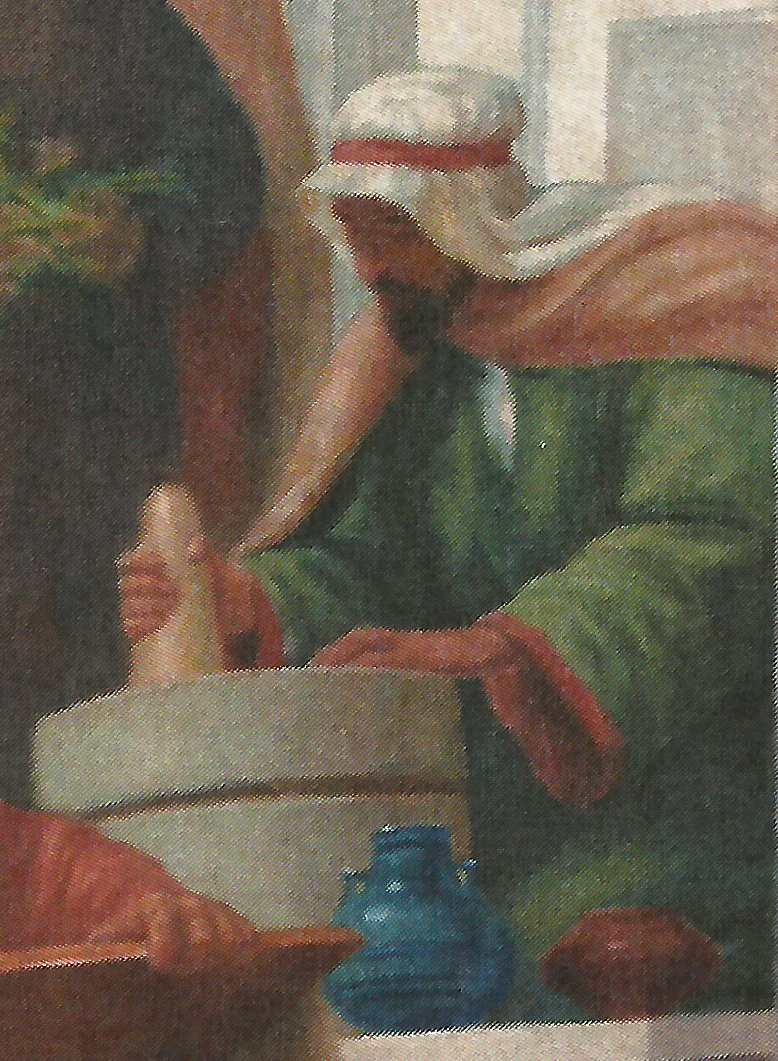
Mesue the Younger, 1906, by Veloso Salgado (NOVA Medical School, Lisbon)

Masawaih al-Mardini (Yahyā ibn Masawaih al-Mardini; known as Mesue the Younger) was a physician. He was born in Iraq. After working in Baghdad, he entered the service of the Fatimid caliph Al-Hakim bi-Amr Allah. He died in 1015 in Cairo at the age of ninety.

Masawaih al-Mardini was a Syriac Orthodox Christian. He is known due to his books on purgatives and emetics (De medicins laxativis) and on the complete pharmacopoeia in 12 parts called the Antidotarium sive Grabadin medicamentorum, which remained for centuries the standard textbook of pharmacy in the West.

He also described methods of distillation of empyreumatic oils. A method of extracting oil from "some kind of bituminous shale", one of the first descriptions of the extraction of shale oil was described by him in the 10th century.
