= Friedrich von Martini =

Swiss engineer (1833–1897)

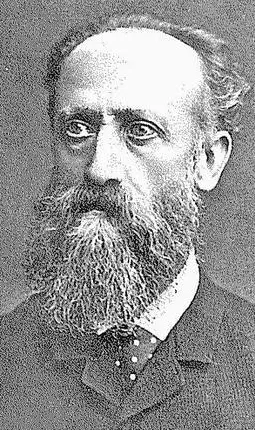
Friedrich von Martini

Friedrich von Martini (24 March 1833 – 29 January 1897) was a Swiss engineer and inventor, for whom the influential Martini–Henry rifle was named in part.

Von Martini was born in Herkulesbad in the Austrian Empire on 24 March 1833. He died in Frauenfeld, Switzerland, on 29 January 1897.

== Sources ==
- Brüderlin, Hans (1990). "Martini, Friedrich von". Neue Deutsche Biographie. Vol. 16 (online ed.). Bavarian Academy of Sciences and Humanities.
- Meyer, Bruno (2011). "Martini, Friedrich von". Historisches Lexikon der Schweiz (online ed.). Swiss Academy of Humanities and Social Sciences.
