= List of libraries owned by Skydance =

This is a list of content libraries and catalogs owned by Skydance.

== Content libraries ==
=== Library size ===
In 2019, CBS and Viacom re-merged to form ViacomCBS (later known as Paramount Global), and the overall combined library was estimated to have 3,600+ film titles and 140,000+ television episodes, including the pre-1973 content programming libraries of CBS' rivals NBC and ABC. In 2020, the library acquired an extra 700 films, after ViacomCBS bought a 49% stake in Miramax. By the time Paramount Global's merger with Skydance Media was announced in 2024, the library was estimated to have 4,000 to 4,500 films and 200,000 television episodes. Roughly 70% of the films were titles which Paramount had acquired the rights to.

=== Skydance Motion Picture Group ===
==== Paramount Pictures ====
- Paramount Pictures film library (pre-1929 and post-1949) (excluding the 2006-2012 DreamWorks Animation film library, which is now owned by Universal Pictures, almost all of the post-1928 and pre-1950 films, owned by Universal Television via EMKA, Ltd., and films owned by third-party companies or in the public domain)
  - Paramount Animation library
  - Paramount Cartoon Studios library (post-March 1962)
  - DreamWorks Pictures film library (1997–2011) (excluding the 1998-2005 DreamWorks Animation film library, which is now owned by Universal Pictures, and some films owned by WestEnd Films)
    - DreamWorks Television (pre-2008) (excluding programs owned by third-parties)
    - Go Fish Pictures
  - Insurge Pictures
  - Paramount Vantage
  - Paramount Games Studio
    - Paramount Digital Entertainment
  - Paramount Players
    - BET Films
  - Nickelodeon Movies
  - Paramount Music discography
  - Distribution rights to the Rysher Entertainment film library (owned by Vine Alternative Investments) (excluding The Opposite of Sex, distributed by Sony Pictures Classics)
    - Distribution rights to the Bing Crosby Productions film library
  - Paramount Digital Studios library
    - Awesomeness
      - Awesomeness Ink
      - Awesomeness Films
      - Awesomeness News
  - Skydance Media film library
    - Skydance Animation film library
- Republic Pictures film library
  - Melange Pictures
    - Republic Pictures theatrical library (1935–1967)
    - Fleischer Studios and (pre-October 1950) Famous Studios libraries
    - Select films from the pre-1952 United Artists library (those films whose rights did not revert to their original producers)
    - Select films produced by Monogram Pictures and Allied Artists Pictures Corporation (post-1938)
    - It's a Wonderful Life by Liberty Films and RKO Radio Pictures
    - Rainbow Productions
    - Enterprise Productions
    - Budd Rogers Releasing Corporation
    - The Lost Moment by Universal Pictures
    - Certain independently produced films acquired from Cary Grant, including Penny Serenade, Indiscreet, Operation Petticoat, The Grass is Greener, That Touch of Mink, and Father Goose.
    - United States Pictures (pre-1960)
    - Commonwealth United Entertainment
      - The Landau-Unger Company
        - Most of the Astor Pictures film library
      - United Pictures Corporation
    - The film library of Bank of America
    - Pre-June 1958 Robert L. Lippert's Regal Films library that were released by 20th Century Fox
    - John Wayne's Batjac Productions library
    - Spelling Films
      - Taft International Pictures
        - Sunn Classic Pictures
      - Television and online streaming distribution rights to the Carolco Pictures and Weintraub Entertainment Group film libraries (under license from StudioCanal and Sony Pictures via Columbia Pictures respectively)
- Miramax film library (49%) (excluding films owned by third-party companies)
  - Miramax Family film library (excluding non-Japanese distribution rights to Princess Mononoke, owned by GKIDS in North America and Goodfellas internationally while the film itself is owned and fully controlled by Studio Ghibli)
  - Miramax Television library
  - Dimension Films library (pre-October 2005) (excluding films owned by third-party companies)
  - International distribution rights to the Samuel Goldwyn Productions film library (co-owned by Samuel Goldwyn Films, excluding films in the public domain)
- CBS Films (excluding international distribution rights to select films, held by Sony Pictures and other third-parties, and domestic distribution rights to select films, held by Lionsgate Films)
  - CBS Theatrical Films
  - Cinema Center Films

==== Warner Bros. Entertainment ====
- Warner Bros. Pictures film library (post-1949) (excluding films owned by third-party companies or owned in the public domain)
  - DC Studios
  - Warner Bros. Japan
    - Warner Bros. Japan Anime Production
  - Warner Bros. Film Productions Germany
  - Warner Bros. Pictures Animation
    - Warner Bros. Feature Animation (predecessor)
    - The Lego Movie (2014–2020) (only films and characters co-produced with Warner Bros. and The Lego Group)
    - Distribution rights to the Locksmith Animation film library (post-December 2024)
  - Seven Arts Productions (excluding co-productions)
    - Seven Arts Television
  - National General Pictures film library (excluding films owned by third-party companies)
    - Banner Productions
  - First Artists film library
  - The Ladd Company film library
  - Orion Pictures film library (pre-May 1982)
  - Lorimar Motion Pictures film library (1978–1990) (excluding films owned by third-party companies)
    - Monogram Pictures/Allied Artists Pictures Corporation film library (post-August 1946)
    - Gun Crazy by King Brothers Productions and United Artists
  - The Geffen Film Company film library
  - Warner Independent Pictures
  - Warner Premiere
  - Warner Bros. Clockwork
  - Legacy Releasing (except films owned by third-party companies)
  - Warner Bros. Family Entertainment (excluding films owned by third-party companies)
  - Dark Castle Entertainment film library (pre-2013) (only films co-produced with Warner Bros. Pictures)
  - RatPac-Dune Entertainment film library (2013–2018) (only films co-produced and co-financed with Warner Bros. Pictures)
  - Distribution rights to The Saul Zaentz Company film library (owned by Teatro della Pace Films)
  - U.S. and Canadian distribution rights to the Samuel Goldwyn Productions film library (excluding The Hurricane, owned by MGM, and films in the public domain)
  - Home video distribution rights to the Cannon Pictures film library (post-June 1991)
  - Flagship Entertainment Group film library (49%) (only films co-produced with Warner Bros. Pictures)
  - New Line Cinema film library (post-November 1984) (excluding films owned by third-party companies)
    - New Line Television
    - Fine Line Features
    - Picturehouse film library (2005–2008)
    - Seven Arts Pictures film library (co-owned with StudioCanal)
- Castle Rock Entertainment film library (post-1994 and pre-revival, including ancillary rights to pre-1994 films which are distributed by Amazon MGM Studios via Orion Pictures) (excluding films owned by third-party companies)
  - Castle Rock Entertainment television library (including ancillary rights to Seinfeld and Thea, distributed by Sony Pictures Television, and excluding The Powers That Be)
- Turner Entertainment Co.
  - Metro-Goldwyn-Mayer film library (pre-May 1986) (excluding Babes in Toyland, Twilight Time and Electric Dreams, owned by MGM themselves via Orion Pictures, with the latter copyrighted to MGM, and films owned by third-party companies or fallen in the public domain)
    - Material from MGM's predecessors (Metro Pictures, Goldwyn Pictures, and Louis B. Mayer Pictures) (post-1915) that did not enter the public domain
    - MGM Television library (pre-1985) (excluding the 1964–1967 Flipper series, and Fame, owned by MGM themselves, with ownership of the former handled through Orion Pictures)
    - MGM Cartoons library (1934–1958, 1961–1967) (excluding the Flip the Frog and Willie Whopper cartoons, owned by Blackhawk Films)
  - A portion of the United Artists library
    - US, Canadian, UK, French, Latin American and Australian distribution rights to the RKO Radio Pictures library (pre-1959) (excluding co-productions and films owned by third-party companies or fallen in the public domain)
    - Gilligan's Island and its animated spin-offs (The New Adventures of Gilligan and Gilligan's Planet) (co-owned with the estate of Phil Silvers)
    - Associated Artists Productions
      - Warner Bros. Pictures film library (pre-1950) (excluding some films that are either in the public domain or owned by third-party companies)
        - First National Pictures
        - The Vitaphone Corporation library (pre-September 1948)
      - The Fleischer Studios/Famous Studios Popeye cartoons, originally released by Paramount Pictures (1933–1957)
        - The Betty Boop cartoon Popeye the Sailor (1933)
        - Let's Sing with Popeye (1934)
  - Brut Productions
  - Particular Crowd film library (pre-2023)
  - TNT Originals
  - TBS Productions/Studio T
  - Turner Pictures
- WaterTower Music discography
  - MGM Records (film and television soundtracks)
  - National General Records
  - New Line Records

=== Skydance TV ===
==== Skydance Television Studios Group ====
- CBS Studios library
  - Big Ticket Television
  - CBS Media Ventures
    - King World Productions
      - Eyemark Entertainment
        - Group W Productions
          - InterStar Releasing
  - Paramount Television library (pre-2006)
    - CBS Productions
    - Desilu Productions (excluding The Ann Sothern Show, owned by Disney via 20th Television)
    - Wilshire Court Productions
    - Viacom Productions
      - Terrytoons
      - Viacom Pictures
  - Distribution rights to the Rysher Entertainment television library (owned by Vine Alternative Investments) (excluding the Saved by the Bell franchise, owned by Universal Television)
    - Bing Crosby Productions television library (distribution)
    - Television Program Enterprises (distribution)
  - Spelling Television
    - Thomas-Spelling Productions
    - Spelling Films
    - Laurel Entertainment library
    - Worldvision Enterprises library (excluding the Harvey Films shorts, owned by Universal Television via DreamWorks Classics, and some programs owned by third-party companies)
      - ABC Films (pre-1973) (excluding series produced by Rankin/Bass Productions, distributed by Universal Television via DreamWorks Animation)
      - Taft Entertainment Television
        - Sunn Classic Pictures television library
        - QM Productions
        - Titus Productions
    - Republic Pictures television library
      - National Telefilm Associates television library
        - Studio City Productions
        - NBC Films (pre-1973) (excluding I Spy and The Bill Cosby Show)
          - California National Productions
    - Late Night Cartoons, Inc.
  - Eye Productions, Inc.
  - Raquel Productions
  - See It Now Studios
- Warner Bros. Television Studios library
  - Alloy Entertainment
  - Warner Horizon Scripted Television
  - Warner Horizon Unscripted Television
    - Shed Media
  - Paramount Television Studios library (post-2006)
    - Showtime/MTV Entertainment Studios (including content from MTV, VH1, TV Land, and Logo TV)
      - Showtime Studios library
    - Skydance Television library
    - Nickelodeon Productions library
  - Telepictures
    - Turner Program Services
    - Rankin/Bass Productions (post-September 1974)
    - Lorimar Television
    - True Crime News
    - Telepictures Music
    - A Very Good Production
      - eleveneleven
  - The Wolper Organization library (post-1970)
  - Blue Ribbon Content
  - Warner Bros. International Television Production
    - Warner Bros. Television Studios UK
      - Shed Media Group
      - Renegade Pictures
      - Ricochet
      - Twenty Twenty Television
      - Wall to Wall Media
    - Warner Bros. International Television Production Australia
    - Warner Bros. International Television Production New Zealand
    - Warner Bros. International Television Production France
    - Warner Bros. International Television Production Germany
    - Warner Bros. International Television Production Switezerland
    - Warner Bros. International Television Production Spain
    - Warner Bros. International Television Production Italy
    - Warner Bros. International Television Production Netherlands
      - BlazHoffski
      - Hollands Light
      - Dahl TV
      - Eyeworks
        - Eyeworks UK
        - Eyeworks Touchdown
        - Eyeworks Cuatro Cabezas
        - Eyeworks Egmond
        - Eyeworks Brazil
    - Warner Bros. International Television Production Finland
    - Warner Bros. International Television Production Sweden
    - Warner Bros. International Television Production Denmark
    - Warner Bros. International Television Production Belgium
      - Savagefilm
    - Little Dot Studios WBITVP
    - Paramount Television International Studios
    - TIS Productions
      - Estudios TeleMéxico

==== Skydance Global Cable Media ====
- Black Entertainment Television LLC
  - BET Interactive
- Cartoon Network library
- Comedy Central
  - Comedy Central Records
- Country Music Television
- Discovery Channel
  - Discovery Kids Media (Latin America) (excluding co-productions and content owned by third-party companies)
- TLC
- Animal Planet
- Discovery Life
- HGTV
- Travel Channel
- Food Network
- Discovery Family (excluding shows owned by Hasbro Entertainment)
- Discovery+ originals
  - Discovery Films
- Paramount Network
- Pop
- Smithsonian Channel
- MTV Documentary Films
- TruTV
- Nickelodeon library (excluding acquired shows using the Nickelodeon branding)
  - Nick Jr. library (excluding Paw Patrol, owned by Spin Master, international distribution rights of The Backyardigans, owned by Nelvana, character elements of Baby Shark's Big Show!, owned by Pinkfong, and acquired shows using the Nick Jr. branding)
  - Nick at Nite library (original programming only)
  - Nicktoons library (excluding Kappa Mikey, owned by Cake Entertainment, Speed Racer: The Next Generation, owned by Tatsunoko Production and acquired shows using the Nicktoons branding)
  - TeenNick library (excluding acquired shows using the TeenNick branding)
  - Noggin LLC
  - Teenage Mutant Ninja Turtles
  - Paws, Inc. (excluding the live-action Garfield films (Garfield: The Movie and Garfield: A Tail of Two Kitties), owned by Disney via 20th Century Studios, and The Garfield Movie, owned by Sony Pictures via Columbia Pictures)
  - Nickelodeon Magazine
  - Nickelodeon Records

==== SKydance Television Animation ====
- CBS Eye Animation Productions
- Nickelodeon Animation Studio (excluding Monster High, owned by Mattel Studios, Transformers: EarthSpark, owned by Hasbro Entertainment, seasons 5–7 of Doug, owned by Disney Entertainment Television, international distribution rights of the first five seasons of The Fairly OddParents, owned by Nelvana, and character elements of Kung Fu Panda: Legends of Awesomeness, Monsters vs. Aliens and The Penguins of Madagascar, owned by DreamWorks Animation Television)
- Warner Bros. Animation library (including Unikitty!, co-produced with The Lego Group, and season 1 of Johnny Test, owned by WildBrain)
  - Warner Bros. Cartoons library
  - Hanna-Barbera library (excluding licensed properties)
    - Ruby-Spears library (pre-1991) (excluding Rambo: The Force of Freedom, owned by StudioCanal, It's Punky Brewster, owned by Universal Television, and Piggsburg Pigs!, owned by ABC Family Worldwide)
  - Cartoon Network Studios library (excluding Star Wars: Clone Wars, owned by Lucasfilm and Transformers: Animated, owned by Hasbro Entertainment)
    - CN LA Original Productions
    - Cartoon Network Games
  - Hanna-Barbera Studios Europe
- Williams Street
  - Adult Swim library (excluding Home Movies, owned by Scholastic, The Boondocks, owned by Sony Pictures Television and Tuca & Bertie, owned by The Tornante Company)
  - Adult Swim Games
  - Williams Street Records

==== Cable News Network, Inc. ====
- CNN Originals
- CNN Films
- HLN Originals
- Great Big Story

==== CBS Entertainment Group ====
- CBS News and Stations
  - CBS News library
    - CBS News Streaming Network

==== Home Box Office, Inc. ====
- HBO
- HBO Entertainment
- HBO Enterprises
- HBO Films
- HBO Documentary Films
- HBO Animation
- HBO Latin America Originals
- HBO Independent Productions
- HBO Downtown Productions (pre-1992)
- Time Life Films (pre-1986)
  - The March of Time
  - Talent Associates (excluding East Side/West Side, owned by MGM Television and McMillan & Wife, owned by Universal Television)

==== Paramount International Networks ====
- Ten Network Holdings
- Ananey Communications

=== DC Comics ===
- Absorbed libraries
  - National Comics Publications (predecessor)
  - All-American Publications (predecessor)
  - Fawcett Comics
  - Quality Comics
  - Charlton Comics
  - Fox Feature Syndicate
  - WildStorm
    - America's Best Comics
    - WildStorm Signature
      - Cliffhanger (predecessor)
      - Homage Comics (predecessor)
    - CMX
  - Mad
  - Milestone Media
    - Earth M
- Elseworlds
- Piranha Press library
  - Paradox Press library (successor)
- Impact Comics library (under license from Archie Comics)
  - Red Circle Comics library (successor)
- Vertigo Comics library
  - DC Black Label library (successor)
    - Hill House Comics library
    - The Sandman Universe
  - Helix library
  - Murphyverse library
- Amalgam Comics (co-owned with Marvel Comics)
- Tangent Comics
- DC Focus
- Johnny DC
- All Star
- Minx
- Zuda Comics
- Earth One
- DC Entertainment
  - Paramount's Superman cartoons (1941–1943)
- Young Animal
- Wonder Comics
- DC Graphic Novels for Young Adults library
  - DC Ink library (predecessor)
- DC Graphic Novels for Kids library
  - DC Zoom library (predecessor)
- DC Universe originals
  - DC Universe Infinite originals (successor)

=== Streaming & Interactive Entertainment ===
- Otter Media
  - Fullscreen originals
  - Machinima, Inc.
  - Rooster Teeth Productions (co-productions with WBD only, most assets owned by Box Canyon Productions)
    - Rooster Teeth Animation (excluding RWBY, owned by Viz Media)
    - Rooster Teeth Games
    - Rooster Teeth Studios
- Paramount+ Originals
- HBO Max
  - Max originals
  - HBO Go originals
- BluTV originals
- Player+ originals
- Warner Bros. Games
  - TT Games (with some exceptions)
    - Traveller's Tales
    - TT Games Publishing
    - TT Fusion
    - TT Animation
    - TT Odyssey
    - TT Centroid
  - Monolith Productions
  - Surreal Software
  - Portkey Games
  - Avalanche Software (post-2017)
  - Rocksteady Studios
  - WB Games Boston
  - WB Games Montréal
  - WB Games New York
  - WB Games San Diego
  - WB Games San Francisco
  - NetherRealm Studios
    - Midway Games (excluding the NBA Jam series, owned by Electronic Arts via EA Sports, and third-party licensed video games)
      - Midway Games West Inc.
      - Time Warner Interactive
      - Williams Electronics
  - Player First Games

=== Music publishing ===
- BET Networks
  - BET Creations, Inc. (SESAC)
  - BET Innovations Publishing, Inc. (ASCAP)
  - BET Music Soundz, Inc. (BMI)
- CBS Entertainment Group
  - Addax Music Company, Inc. (ASCAP)
  - Aspenfair Music, Inc. (ASCAP)
  - Beverlyfax Music, Inc. (BMI)
  - Big Ticket Music Inc. (ASCAP)
  - Large Ticket Songs Inc. (BMI)
  - Bruin Music Company (BMI)
  - Camelot-King Music (ASCAP)
  - Compelling Music LLC (ASCAP)
  - Proxy Music LLC (BMI)
  - O Good Songs Company (BMI)
  - Spelling Aaron Music Co. Inc. (ASCAP)
  - Spelling Daytime Songs Inc. (BMI)
  - Spelling Films Music Inc. (ASCAP)
  - Spelling Television Music (ASCAP)
  - Spelling Ventures Music (BMI)
  - SVO Music (ASCAP)
  - VSC Music LLC
    - VSC Compositions LLC (ASCAP)
- DW Music Publishing L.L.C.
  - DW II Distribution Music LLC (ASCAP)
  - DW II Distribution MusicB LLC (BMI)
- Paramount Media Networks
  - Chuckle Channel Music Inc. (ASCAP)
  - Hilarity Music Inc. (BMI)
  - MTV Songs Inc. (ASCAP)
  - Music by Nickelodeon Inc. (BMI)
  - Music by Video, Inc. (BMI)
  - Nickelodeon Notes Inc. (SESAC)
  - Tunes by Nickelodeon Inc. (ASCAP)
  - Tunes by Viacom Inc. (ASCAP)
  - Viacom August Inc. (ASCAP)
  - Viacom Blue Sky Inc. (BMI)
  - Viacom Galaxy Tunes Inc. (Global Music Rights)
  - Viacom Music (BMI)
  - Viacom Notes Inc (SESAC)
  - Viacom Origins Inc. (SESAC)
  - Viacom Songs Inc. (BMI)
- Paramount Pictures Corporation
  - Paramount Allegra Music (ASCAP)
  - Paramount Alvarado Music (ASCAP)
  - Paramount Bronson Music (BMI)
  - Paramount Bella Music (BMI)
  - Paramount Gloria Music (Global Music Rights)
  - Paramount Simpatico Music (SESAC)
  - Paramount Sunset Music (SESAC)
- Showtime Networks
  - Showtime Melodies Inc. (SESAC)
  - Showtime Songs Inc. (ASCAP)
  - SHOtunes Music LLC (BMI)
- SKG Music Publishing L.L.C.
  - Songs of SKG (BMI)
  - SKG Songs (ASCAP)
- Lorimar Music Publishing, Inc.
  - Lorimar Music A Corp. (ASCAP)
  - Lorimar Music Bee Corp. (BMI)
- New Line Melodies (SESAC)
- New Line Music Corp. (BMI)
- New Line Tunes (ASCAP)
- T-L Music Publishing Company, Inc.
  - Eleven Hundred Music (SESAC)
  - L-T Music Publishing (BMI)
  - T-L Music Publishing (ASCAP)
- Turner Music Publishing Inc.
  - RET Music, Inc. (ASCAP)
  - Super Satellite Music (BMI)
  - Techwood Music, Inc. (ASCAP)
  - Ten Fifty Music, Inc. (BMI)
  - Title Match Music, Inc. (SESAC)
  - Turner Music Canada, Inc. (SOCAN)
- Warner-Barham Music LLC (BMI)
- Warner-Hollywood Music LLC (SESAC)
- Warner-Olive Music LLC (ASCAP)

== See also ==
- List of Skydance television programs
- List of Warner Bros. Discovery television programs
- List of libraries owned by Warner Bros. Discovery
