= List of libraries owned by Warner Bros. Discovery =

This is a list of content libraries and catalogs that were owned by Warner Bros. Discovery.

== Content libraries ==
=== Streaming and Studios ===
==== Warner Bros. ====
- Warner Bros. Pictures film library (post-1949) (excluding films owned by third-party companies or owned in the public domain)
  - DC Studios
  - Warner Bros. Japan
    - Warner Bros. Japan Anime Production
  - Warner Bros. Film Productions Germany
  - Warner Bros. Pictures Animation
    - Warner Bros. Feature Animation (predecessor)
    - Distribution rights to the Locksmith Animation film library (post-December 2024)
  - Seven Arts Productions (excluding co-productions)
    - Seven Arts Television
  - National General Pictures film library (excluding the Cinema Center Films library, owned by Paramount Pictures, and films owned by third-party companies)
    - Banner Productions
  - First Artists film library
  - The Ladd Company film library (pre-1985)
  - Orion Pictures film library (pre-May 1982)
  - Lorimar Motion Pictures film library (1978–1990) (excluding films owned by third-party companies)
    - Monogram Pictures/Allied Artists Pictures Corporation film library (post-August 1946)
  - The Geffen Film Company film library (excluding Beavis and Butt-Head Do America, owned by Paramount Pictures via MTV Entertainment Studios)
  - Warner Independent Pictures
  - Warner Premiere
  - Warner Bros. Clockwork
  - Legacy Releasing (except films owned by third-party companies)
  - Warner Bros. Family Entertainment (excluding films owned by third-party companies)
  - Dark Castle Entertainment film library (pre-2013) (only films co-produced with Warner Bros. Pictures)
  - RatPac-Dune Entertainment film library (2013–2018) (only films co-produced and co-financed with Warner Bros. Pictures)
  - Distribution rights to The Saul Zaentz Company film library (owned by Teatro della Pace Films; excluding The English Patient, owned by Paramount Pictures via Miramax Films)
  - US and Canadian distribution rights to the Samuel Goldwyn Productions film library (excluding The Hurricane, owned by MGM, and films in the public domain)
  - Home video distribution rights to the Cannon Pictures film library (post-June 1991)
  - Flagship Entertainment Group film library (49%) (only films co-produced with Warner Bros. Pictures)
  - New Line Cinema film library (post-November 1984) (excluding films owned by third-party companies)
    - New Line Television
    - Fine Line Features
    - Picturehouse film library (2005–2008)
- Castle Rock Entertainment film library (post-1994 and pre-revival, including ancillary rights to pre-1994 films which are distributed by Amazon MGM Studios via Orion Pictures) (excluding films owned by third-party companies)
  - Castle Rock Entertainment television library (including ancillary rights to Seinfeld and Thea, distributed by Sony Pictures Television, and excluding The Powers That Be)
- Warner Bros. Animation library
  - Warner Bros. Cartoons library
  - Hanna-Barbera library (excluding licensed properties)
    - Ruby-Spears library (pre-1991) (excluding Rambo: The Force of Freedom, owned by StudioCanal, It's Punky Brewster, owned by Universal Television, and Piggsburg Pigs!, owned by ABC Family Worldwide)
- Turner Entertainment Co.
  - Metro-Goldwyn-Mayer film library (pre-May 1986) (excluding Babes in Toyland, Twilight Time and Electric Dreams, owned by MGM themselves via Orion Pictures, with the latter copyrighted to MGM, and films owned by third-party companies or fallen in the public domain)
    - Material from MGM's predecessors (Metro Pictures, Goldwyn Pictures, and Louis B. Mayer Pictures) (post-1915) that did not enter the public domain
    - MGM Television library (pre-1985) (excluding the 1964–1967 Flipper series, and Fame, owned by MGM themselves, with ownership of the former handled through Orion Pictures)
    - MGM Cartoons library (1934–1958, 1961–1967) (excluding the Flip the Frog and Willie Whopper cartoons, owned by the Iwerks estate)
  - A portion of the United Artists library
    - US, Canadian, UK, French, Latin American and Australian distribution rights to the RKO Radio Pictures library (pre-1959) (excluding co-productions and films owned by third-party companies or fallen in the public domain)
    - Gilligan's Island and its animated spin-offs (The New Adventures of Gilligan and Gilligan's Planet) (co-owned with the estate of Phil Silvers)
    - Associated Artists Productions
      - Warner Bros. Pictures film library (pre-1950) (excluding some films that are either in the public domain or owned by third-party companies)
        - First National Pictures
        - Distribution rights to the pre-September 1948 The Vitaphone Corporation library.
        - Distribution rights to the Warner Bros. Cartoons library (pre-August 1948 color cartoons and Bugs Bunny: Superstar)
          - Distribution rights to the Harman and Ising-produced Merrie Melodies cartoons (excluding Lady, Play Your Mandolin!)
      - Paramount's Popeye the Sailor cartoons (1933–1957) (under license from King Features Syndicate)
  - Brut Productions
  - Particular Crowd film library (pre-2023)
  - TNT Originals
  - Turner Pictures
- WaterTower Music discography
  - MGM Records (film and television soundtracks)
  - National General Records
  - New Line Records

==== Home Box Office, Inc. ====
- HBO
- HBO Entertainment
- HBO Enterprises
- HBO Films
- HBO Documentary Films
- HBO Animation
- HBO Latin America Originals
- HBO Independent Productions
- HBO Downtown Productions (pre-1992)
- Time Life Films (pre-1986)
  - The March of Time
  - Talent Associates (excluding East Side/West Side, owned by MGM Television, McMillan & Wife, owned by Universal Television, and most shows co-produced with CBS Productions, owned by CBS Media Ventures; includes ancillary and home media rights to Get Smart, which was distributed by CBS Media Ventures)

==== Television Studios ====
- Warner Bros. Television Studios
  - Alloy Entertainment
  - Warner Horizon Scripted Television
  - Warner Horizon Unscripted Television
    - Shed Media
  - Telepictures
    - Turner Program Services
    - Rankin/Bass Productions (post-September 1974)
    - Lorimar Television
    - True Crime News
    - Telepictures Music
    - A Very Good Production
      - eleveneleven
  - The Wolper Organization library (post-1970)
  - Blue Ribbon Content
  - The Cartoon Network, Inc.
    - Cartoon Network library
      - Cartoon Network Studios library (excluding Star Wars: Clone Wars, owned by Lucasfilm and Transformers: Animated, owned by Hasbro Entertainment)
      - CN LA Original Productions
      - Williams Street
      - Adult Swim library (excluding Home Movies, owned by Scholastic, The Boondocks, owned by Sony Pictures Television and Tuca & Bertie, owned by The Tornante Company)
  - Hanna-Barbera Studios Europe
  - Warner Bros. International Television Production
    - Warner Bros. Television Studios UK
      - Shed Media Group
      - Renegade Pictures
      - Ricochet
      - Twenty Twenty Television
      - Wall to Wall Media
    - Eyeworks
      - Eyeworks UK
      - Eyeworks Touchdown
      - Eyeworks Cuatro Cabezas
      - Eyeworks Egmond
      - Eyeworks Brazil

==== DC Comics ====
- Absorbed libraries
  - National Comics Publications (predecessor)
  - All-American Publications (predecessor)
  - Fawcett Comics
  - Quality Comics
  - Charlton Comics
  - Fox Feature Syndicate
  - WildStorm
    - America's Best Comics
    - WildStorm Signature
      - Cliffhanger (predecessor)
      - Homage Comics (predecessor)
    - CMX
  - Mad
  - Milestone Media
    - Earth M
- Elseworlds
- Piranha Press library
  - Paradox Press library (successor)
- Impact Comics library (under license from Archie Comics)
  - Red Circle Comics library (successor)
- Vertigo Comics library
  - DC Black Label library (successor)
    - Hill House Comics library
    - The Sandman Universe
  - Helix library
  - Murphyverse library
- Amalgam Comics (co-owned with Marvel Comics)
- Tangent Comics
- DC Focus
- Johnny DC
- All Star
- Minx
- Zuda Comics
- Earth One
- DC Entertainment
  - Paramount's Superman cartoons (1941–1943)
- Young Animal
- Wonder Comics
- DC Graphic Novels for Young Adults library
  - DC Ink library (predecessor)
- DC Graphic Novels for Kids library
  - DC Zoom library (predecessor)
- DC Universe originals
  - DC Universe Infinite originals (successor)

==== Streaming & Interactive Entertainment ====
- Otter Media
  - Fullscreen originals
  - Machinima, Inc.
  - Rooster Teeth Productions
    - Rooster Teeth Animation
    - Rooster Teeth Games
    - Rooster Teeth Studios
- HBO Max
  - Max originals
  - HBO Go originals
- BluTV originals
- Player+ originals
- Warner Bros. Games
  - TT Games (with some exceptions)
    - Traveller's Tales
    - TT Games Publishing
    - TT Fusion
    - TT Animation
    - TT Odyssey
    - TT Centroid
  - Monolith Productions
  - Surreal Software
  - Portkey Games
  - Avalanche Software (post-2017)
  - Rocksteady Studios
  - WB Games Boston
  - WB Games Montréal
  - WB Games New York
  - WB Games San Diego
  - WB Games San Francisco
  - NetherRealm Studios
    - Midway Games (excluding the NBA Jam series, owned by Electronic Arts via EA Sports, and third-party licensed video games)
      - Midway Games West Inc.
      - Time Warner Interactive
      - Williams Electronics
  - Player First Games

==== Music publishing ====
- Lorimar Music Publishing, Inc.
  - Lorimar Music A Corp. (ASCAP)
  - Lorimar Music Bee Corp. (BMI)
- New Line Melodies (SESAC)
- New Line Music Corp. (BMI)
- New Line Tunes (ASCAP)
- T-L Music Publishing Company, Inc.
  - Eleven Hundred Music (SESAC)
  - L-T Music Publishing (BMI)
  - T-L Music Publishing (ASCAP)
- Turner Music Publishing Inc.
  - RET Music, Inc. (ASCAP)
  - Super Satellite Music (BMI)
  - Techwood Music, Inc. (ASCAP)
  - Ten Fifty Music, Inc. (BMI)
  - Title Match Music, Inc. (SESAC)
  - Turner Music Canada, Inc. (SOCAN)
- Warner-Barham Music LLC (BMI)
- Warner-Hollywood Music LLC (SESAC)
- Warner-Olive Music LLC (ASCAP)

=== Global Linear Networks ===
- Discovery Channel
- TLC
- Animal Planet
- Discovery Life
- HGTV
- Travel Channel
- Food Network
- Discovery Family
- TruTV
- Discovery+ originals
  - Discovery Films

==== Cable News Network, Inc. ====
- CNN Originals
- CNN Films
- HLN Originals
- Great Big Story

== See also ==
- List of Skydance television programs
- List of Warner Bros. Discovery television programs
- List of Discovery Channel original programming
- List of Animal Planet original programming
- List of Food Network original programming
- List of Travel Channel original programming
- List of assets owned by Warner Bros. Discovery
- Lists of Warner Bros. films
- List of New Line Cinema films
- List of Castle Rock Entertainment films
- List of HBO Films films
- List of libraries owned by Skydance
