= Disney Adventures =

Children's magazine

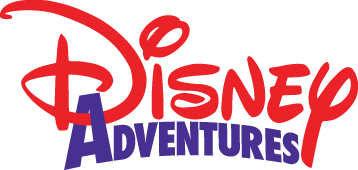
- Disney Adventures' fifth and final logo (2006–2007)
- Categories: Children, entertainment
- Frequency: Twelve times per year
- First issue: November 12, 1990
- Final issue: November 2007
- Company: Disney Publishing Worldwide (Disney Consumer Products)
- Country: United States
- Based in: Burbank, California
- Language: English
- ISSN: 1050-2491

Disney Adventures (also short-formed as D.A.) was an American children's magazine published twelve (later ten) times per year by Disney Publishing Worldwide, a subsidiary of Disney Consumer Products, a unit of The Walt Disney Company. It should not be confused with the (also defunct) Disney Magazine. Disney Adventures also contained the latest news concerning Disney Channel.

== History ==
Michael Lynton was inspired to start the magazine after noting the success of Topolino, the Italian Mickey Mouse magazine, which included comics and features. The magazine was first published on October 9, 1990 (and cover dated November 12, 1990) and featured a wide assortment of educational material, entertainment news (from Disney and other studios), sports coverage, profiles of celebrities, user contributions, and puzzle games. Regular features included a guide to television, movies, books, and music called “Ticket”, factoids about unusual yet real things under the title “Weird Yet True”, and a sports guide that appeared during the late 1990s called “ESPN Action.” The first issue featured Canadian actor Rick Moranis and Baloo from TaleSpin on the cover.

In the early years of the magazine, the comics actually featured in the magazine were standard Disney-based comics such as DuckTales, Chip 'n Dale Rescue Rangers, TaleSpin, Darkwing Duck, Goof Troop, Mickey Mouse, Gargoyles, Bonkers, and various adaptations of Disney feature films. As the magazine evolved, non-Disney material from artists such as Sergio Aragonés, Evan Dorkin, Matt Groening, William Van Horn, and Jeff Smith began appearing with some regularity. In addition, well-known comic book industry names such as Marv Wolfman and Heidi MacDonald worked as comics editors for the magazine during the mid-to-late 1990s.

Cover artwork for issues commonly featured an actor or musician interacting with a Disney cartoon character through 1995, and occasionally thereafter until April 1998. Issues came out monthly until 1999, when the January & February issues were replaced by one winter issue. Starting in 2000, D.A. reduced two summer month releases into one issue as well. With slight calendar adjustments, this format remained until the magazine stopped publishing. From 1991 To 2003 (with the exception of 1998), additional special issues were also released, either for collector purposes or to tie in with a new movie or TV series, or with an overarching theme (like the three "Music" issues released annually from 1999 to 2001).

A special Goof Troop themed issue featuring recent articles and comic reprints was distributed to restaurants and Disney Afternoon affiliates in the summer of 1992. Two similar issues were distributed to Burger King as giveaways in 1993.

The original slanted Disney Adventures logo survived in a few variations for all but the magazine's last year and a 7-month period in 1996 and 1997. Upon inception until March 1992, the logo was in a basic arched font, before being stylized (prominently with a bar added from the left of the A). In December 1996, D.A. changed its logo to a straight and more basic font, with a larger Disney logo, but reader complaints led to the prior logo being reinstated for the June 30, 1997 issue, though initially keeping the larger Disney logo through the end of that year. Starting in March 1999, the logo's 3D effect was removed in favor of a drop shadow, which remained in usage until the final logo was introduced in September 2006. From April 1992 to January 1995 and from June 30, 1997 to March 1999, the long-standing tagline The Magazine For Kids was a logo element in its underline. Issues released through 1997 had bound spines similar to Reader's Digest magazine and Archie Comics (both typically also digest publications), before switching to stapled binding in 1998.

From 1999 to 2007, Disney Adventures held an annual "Cool Pets Contest", featuring five of the "coolest" and most talented pets along with their owners. In later years, Disney Adventures included information on the Disney Channel and featured articles on the latest movies especially from Walt Disney Pictures. The magazine offered features on Walt Disney Parks and Resorts as well as music, movies, trends, science, travel, games, puzzles, heroes, explorers and "real life adventures" (archaeology, extreme sports and other hobbies and careers).

=== Cancellation ===
On August 21, 2007, The Walt Disney Company announced that Disney Adventures would be discontinued, with the final issue cover dated November 2007, which was the magazine's 17th "birthday". The final issue's actual release date was October 16, 2007. For subscribers, Disney Adventures was normally replaced with Sports Illustrated Kids or Family Fun for the remainder of the subscription period. Some subscriptions were proactively converted to Boys' Life magazine, without any option for pro-rated refunds. Disney processed subscription refunds in March 2008.

The decision to cease publishing Disney Adventures evidently came rather suddenly, as the October 2007 issue contained a "Cool Christmas" subscription gift order form. It seems unlikely that the magazine would have sold subscriptions at that late date, had the staff known of its impending cancellation.

== Disney Adventures All-Stars ==
"Disney Adventures All-Stars" was a feature of the magazine that rewards the act of volunteering in the community. It was held once a year and all participants were awarded a prize, but after judging, one winner was selected to participate in a volunteer project with the hosts of that particular year.

In 2006, the hosts were the cast of High School Musical. Previous hosts included the cast of The Suite Life of Zack & Cody and other Disney Channel stars.

== Comics ==
After previously publishing a special all-comics issue of D.A. in 2002, Disney Adventures expanded its publication schedule to include an all-comics magazine in 2004, named Comic Zone after the regular magazine's section of that name. Comic Zone published twice in 2004 before becoming a quarterly publication from 2005 to 2007. In addition to Disney properties like The Lion King, Pirates of the Caribbean and Aladdin, Disney Adventures published quite a bit of original comic material, such as:

- Dizzy Adventures
- Gorilla Gorilla
- Jet Pack Pets
- Kid Gravity
- Little Gloomy
- Society of Horrors
- The Hair Pair
- The Last Laugh (not to be confused with the movie of the same name)
- Kid Blastoff
- Luna Park
- Movie-related comics (such as Lilo & Stitch, Pirates of the Caribbean, Spy Kids, etc.)

Over the course of publication, a wide variety of comics professionals contributed to Disney Adventures Comic Zone section. Frequent contributors included: Garry Black, Art Baltazar, Eric Jones, Matt Feazell, Landry Walker, Rick Geary, Evan Dorkin, John Green, Bob Fingerman, Elizabeth Watsin, Christine Norrie and Jeff Smith. The Fall 2007 issue reprinted the first six installments of the Walt Disney's Treasury of Classic Tales comic strip adaptation of The Black Hole drawn by Jack Kirby. Early issues also contained chapters of Bone.

=== Collected volumes ===
Disney Press released several collected volumes of Disney Adventures comics, two of which are Disney Adventures original creations. Each book is approximately 96 pages in length.

- Comic Zone Volume 1: Lilo & Stitch
- Comic Zone Volume 2: Gorilla Gorilla
- Comic Zone Volume 3: Disney's Tall Tails
- Comic Zone Volume 4: Kid Gravity
- Comic Zone Volume 5: Aladdin
- Comic Zone Volume 6: The Lion King
- Comic Zone Volume 7: The Wild

== International ==
Disney Adventures was also published outside of America, notably in Australia, where the magazine had now been published for over 10 years by ACP Magazines Limited and was distributed to nearby Asia Pacific Islands and New Zealand. Besides featuring Disney articles, Disney Adventures' Australian edition up to the mid-2000s also featured non-Disney articles particularly about Harry Potter and anime, where for a time Neon Genesis Evangelion was heavily promoted.

During 1994 to 1996, the magazine had its own edition in Mexico.

From December 2006 to February 2010, an Indian edition was published. Its 2010 cancellation was confirmed on the magazine's Facebook group; but the reason remains unknown as of this writing, as the magazine was very popular with its audience in India.
