= Catwoman: Soulstealer =

2018 Novel by Sarah J. Maas

- Author: Sarah J. Maas
- Cover artist: Howard Huang; Stuart Wade
- Language: English
- Series: DC Icons
- Genre: Bildungsroman
- Publisher: Random House
- Publication date: August 7, 2018
- Publication place: United States
- Media type: Hardcover, e-book, audiobook
- Pages: 384
- ISBN: 0399549692
- Followed by: Superman: Dawnbreaker

Catwoman: Soulstealer is a 2018 young adult coming of age novel by Sarah J. Maas. It is the third novel in the DC Icons series, following Wonder Woman: Warbringer by Leigh Bardugo and Batman: Nightwalker by Marie Lu. The DC Icons novels retell the stories of renowned DC heroes in their adolescence before they become a superhero. Catwoman: Soulstealer features numerous DC characters including Batwing, Harley Quinn, Poison Ivy, and The Joker.

The novel follows Selina Kyle, a teenager living in Gotham City, who must fight in an underworld gang called the Leopards to make ends meet. She continues to do so to support her sister who has an illness. The authorities descend onto their shared apartment in an attempt to bring her sister to an orphanage. Selina attempts to flee from them, assaulting them in the process. A member of the League of Assassins offers to expunge her criminal record if she accompanies them. Kyle breaks off from them and returns to Gotham disguised as a socialite. She undertakes robberies of the biggest museums of the bank with the help of Poison Ivy and Harley Quinn to wreak havoc and enact revenge on the corrupt officials of Gotham City.

Upon release, Catwoman: Soulstealer received mixed reviews. Kirkus Reviews included it in its starred reviews. Common Sense Media considered the book mediocre, granting it a rating of three out of five stars, questioning the medium used to convey Catwoman's story.

== Plot ==
Selina Kyle and her younger sister, Maggie, who has cystic fibrosis, live in a run down apartment in Gotham City. To pay the rent and Maggie's medical expenses, she fights for Carmine Falcone, an underworld mob boss, who stages fights with a group of fighters known as the Leopards. Selina's apartment gets raided by police and a social worker, who plans to send Maggie to a foster home. Enraged, Selina attempts to fight the police to allow Maggie to escape, but she is tased unconscious. Selina awakens to Talia al Ghul, a member of the League of Assassins, who offers to expunge her criminal record if Selina flies to Italy with her. Facing a hefty sentence, Selina goes with Talia to train with the League and become an assassin.

2 years later, Selina flees the League and returns to Gotham under a false identity, Holly Vanderhees. Selina begins a theft spree as Catwoman, including stealing artwork from her neighbor Luke Fox, and later becoming partners with Poison Ivy. The two recruit Harley Quinn, promising to break the Joker out of prison in exchange for her help. During heist preparations, League assassin Wraith attacks Selina, which rouses her partner's suspicions. While scoping out their next target in an abandoned warehouse, Harley confronts Selina and Ivy, impatient over not fulfilling their promise. Police ambush them, resulting in Selina being detained and her identity revealed.

Joker's associates free Selina from prison, and she agrees to divulge information regarding the Lazarus Pit, which she gleaned from a scientist. Selina skips the meeting to visit Maggie instead, helping her escape from the hospital. Harley Quinn ambushes Selina during the escape, but Selina is saved by Poison Ivy. Selina returns to the warehouse and is grievously wounded by assassins. Batwing saves Selina, and Selina places Maggie in the Lazarus Pit, which heals her, but Selina passes away shortly after. Poison Ivy and Batwing submerge Selina in the Pit, reviving her.

With Harley Quinn and the League defeated, peace is restored in Gotham; Selina sends Maggie back to her foster parents and begins dating Luke. Later, Selina and Poison Ivy agree to move in together. Meanwhile, an imprisoned Harley vows to fix her ways.

== Characters ==
- Selina Kyle: The main protagonist of the novel who takes on the personality of Holly Vanderhees after stealing Talia's personal information. She originally fights for the Leopards in the underworld where she was an undefeated champion. She moves to Italy for a period of two years to train with the League of Assassin's. As she becomes disillusioned with the goals of the groups, she flees from them and returns to Gotham City to enact revenge on the rich who have corrupted Gotham City. Her alter ego is Catwoman.
- Luke Fox: The main hero of the novel, he works in tandem with the Gotham Police Department as Batwing. He vows to rid the city of crime although he has misgivings about the police department after the racial discrimination he observes. He is the son of a socialite family. His father works for Bruce Wayne's company.
- Poison Ivy: A villain whose main focus is to fight against climate change and to raise awareness of the destruction the environment. She begins her criminal ways after being experimented on as a teenager and uses what she learned therefrom to use natural concoctions to eliminate her enemies. She encounters Selina during a bank robbery, and the two decide to tag along as a group.
- Harley Quinn: The Joker's former girlfriend, her main goal consists in freeing him from prison. Her participation in Selina's groups is entirely contingent on this stipulation.
- Maggie Kyle: Selina's younger sister who has cystic fibrosis. Her prospects of surviving are dim, and once Selina leaves Gotham, a family decides to adopt her. The Lazarus Pit that Selina builds cures her of her illness and she returns to her foster parents.
- Maria Kyle: Selina and Maggie's mother. Not much is known about her, as she is not prominent in either of her daughter's lives and is in prison for unknown reasons.
- James Gordon: The head of the Gotham Police Department, he is the only individual from the squad whom Luke confides in. He coordinates with Luke to eliminate corruption and crime in Gotham.
- The Joker: The most notorious criminal in Gotham, his henchman manage to free him from prison and Selina leads him into a trap, which results in his incarceration once again.
- Talia al Ghūl: One of the leaders of the group of assassins, she recruits Selina and Selina steals her identity to become a socialite in Gotham. When she realizes this, she dispatches a squad of assassins to put an end to Selina.
- Nyssa al Ghūl: A ruthless wraith who is in charge of the training of members of the League of Assassin's. She shows no mercy for trainees who fail to meet expectations and downplays the worries that Selina has for her sister.
- Carmine Falcone: Leader of an underworld group, the Leopards, he recruits women to engage in fights against people who owe him money. Near the end of the novel, he stations some of the Leopards in front of the hospital to protect Selina.

== Critical reception ==
Michael Berry of Common Sense Media gave the novel a rating of three out of five stars, criticizing the method in which Maas told the story. He believes that a superhero character lends itself better to a graphic novel and the details of Catwoman's life are handled clumsily, but praised the novel for the humorous dialogue and the fights that further the plot. Nevertheless, he criticized the plot for stalling midway through the novel and consequently, considered this novel as one that only appeals to fans of Catwoman.

Kirkus Reviews had high praise for the novel, including it among its starred reviews. It praised Maas' knack for creating independent female characters that display a great depth of character. In particular, it praised Selina's character for her intelligence, adeptness and ambiguous sense of virtue and considered these traits to be a strong reflection of an antihero. In addition, Kirkus praised the novel for its diversity in ethnicities and sexual orientations and the tinge of romance that captivates the reader's attention.

== Adaptation ==
Catwoman: Soulstealer was adapted into a DC Graphic Novels for Young Adults release. It is written by Louise Simonson and illustrated by Samantha Dodge. This adaptation was released on June 1, 2021.
