= Landry Walker =

American comic book writer

- Born: Landry Q. Walker; September 1, 1971 (age 55)
- Area: Writer
- Notable works: Little Gloomy

Landry Q. Walker (born September 1, 1971), is an American comic book writer living in El Sobrante, California.

== Career ==
Landry Walker is the co-creator (with artist Eric Jones) of a number of comic book series, and was a regular contributor to Disney Adventures Magazine during the last several years of its run. He is known for his all-ages comics work, such as Supergirl: Cosmic Adventures in the 8th Grade, Batman: The Brave and the Bold and The Incredibles comic series. Walker is also a contributing writer for the gaming website Elder-Geek.

In 2012 Del Rey released an original Odd Thomas graphic novel written by Walker with series creator Dean Koontz. The book reached number 7 on the New York Times Best Sellers list for Graphic Novels. More recently, Walker began a new comic series (again with longtime collaborator Eric Jones) for Image Comics called Danger Club about a brutal world of teenage superheroes.

Walker is the co-creator of the internationally broadcast cartoon series called Scary Larry, which is an adaptation of his comic series titled Little Gloomy.

== Bibliography ==
=== Comics ===
- Filthy Habits #1-5 (1994–1996, Aeon Comics)
- X-Ray Comics #1-3 (1997–1998, Slave Labor Graphics):
  - X-Ray Comics Volume 1: Filth (SLG Publishing, 2004, ISBN 0-943151-97-X)
  - X-Ray Comics Volume 2: Swine (SLG Publishing, 2004, ISBN 1-59362-004-7)
- Comic Zone 4: Kid Gravity (Disney Press, 2005, ISBN 978-0-7868-3765-6)
- Little Gloomy #1-6 (1999–2001, Slave Labor Graphics, tpb, Little Gloomy: It was a Dark and Stormy Night, SLG Publishing, 2002, ISBN 0-943151-64-3)
- The Super Scary Monster Show featuring Little Gloomy #1-3 (2005–2006, Slave Labor Graphics, tpb, 2008, ISBN 1-59362-103-5)
- Tron: The Ghost in the Machine #1-6 (2006–2008, Slave Labor Graphics, tpb, 2009, ISBN 1-59362-102-7)
- Supergirl: Cosmic Adventures in the Eighth Grade #1-6 (2008-2009 DC Comics, tpb, 2009, ISBN 1-4012-2506-3)
- The Incredibles: City of Incredibles (with co-author Mark Waid, Boom! Studios, tpb, 2010 ISBN 1608865037)
- The Incredibles: The Incredibles: Revenge From Below (with co-author Mark Waid, Boom! Studios, tpb, 2010 ISBN 1608865185)
- The Incredibles: The Incredibles: Secrets and Lies Boom! Studios, tpb, 2010 ISBN 1608865835)
- The Incredibles: The Incredibles: Truth and Consequences Boom! Studios, tpb, 2010 ISBN 1608866033)
- Batman: Joker's Asylum Vol. 2 (DC Comics, tpb, 2011, ISBN 1401229808) 1848569955
- Batman: The Brave and the Bold: The Fearsome Fangs Strike Again (DC Comics, tpb, 2011, ISBN 1848569955)
- Batman: The Brave and the Bold: Emerald Knight (DC Comics, tpb, 2012,) ISBN 1401231438
- Odd Thomas: House of Odd (Del Rey Books, tpb, 2012,) ISBN 0345525450
- Danger Club Volume 1: Death (Image Comics, tpb, 2012 ISBN 1607066343
- Danger Club Volume 2: Rebirth (Image Comics, tpb, 2015 ISBN 163215367X
- A Clash of Kings Volume 1 (Batam, 2018 ISBN 9780440423249
- The Last Siege (Image Comics, tpb, 2019 ISBN 1534310517
- A Clash of Kings Volume 2 (Batam, 2019 ISBN 0440423252
- The Infinite Adventures of Supernova: Pepper Page Saves the Universe! (First Second, 2021, ISBN 9781250216922)
- Butcher's Boy (Dark Horse, 2025, ISBN 9781506741611)

=== Short stories ===
- Star Wars: High Noon on Jakku
- Star Wars: The Face of Evil
- Star Wars: True Love
- Star Wars: All Creatures Great and Small
- Star Wars: A Recipe for Death
- Star Wars: The Crimson Corsair and the Lost Treasure of Count Dooku

=== Novels ===
- Project Terra book 1: Crash Course 2017 ISBN 0515157910
- Project Terra book 2: Bites Back 2018 ISBN 0515157945
