= DC Graphic Novels for Kids =

Imprint of DC Comics

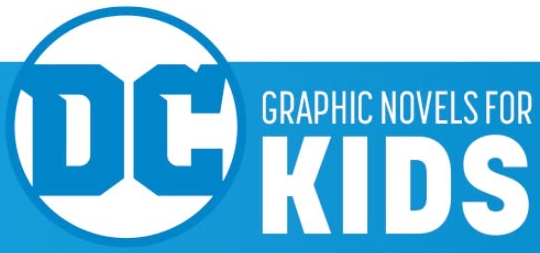
- Parent company: DC Comics
- Status: Active
- Predecessor: DC Zoom (2018–2019)
- Founded: 2020; 6 years ago
- Founder: Michele R. Wells
- Country of origin: United States
- Headquarters location: New York City
- Publication types: Graphic novel, one-shot comics
- Fiction genres: Action; Adventure; Crime; Drama; Fantasy; Mystery; Supernatural; Science fiction; Superhero; Children
- Official website: dccomics.com/GraphicNovelsForKids

DC Graphic Novels for Kids, formerly known as DC Zoom, is an imprint of American comic book publisher DC Comics consisting of original one-shots and reprints of books previously published under other imprints. The imprint intends to present traditional DC Universe characters for middle-grade readers. The first title of the DC Zoom imprint, DC Super Hero Girls: Search for Atlantis was published on September 26, 2018. Black Canary: Ignite and Super Sons Book Two: The Foxglove Mission were the last titles to be published under DC Ink. Diana: Princess of the Amazons, the first title of DC Graphic Novels for Kids, was published on January 7, 2020. The first reprint, DC Super Hero Girls: Weird Science was published on July 14, 2020.

== History ==
=== Launch ===
DC Zoom original logo

In 2017, DC Comics announced that a new untitled young readers imprint would launch in 2018. Abraham Riesman, for Vulture, highlighted a shift in audience for graphic novels that did not have to do with either Marvel or DC Comics; Riesman wrote that "shift was the result of decisions made by librarians, teachers, kids'-book publishers, and people born after the year 2000. Abruptly, the most important sector in the world of sequential art has become graphic novels for young people. [...] According to Milton Griepp of comics-industry analysis site ICv2, aggregated annual comics sales across different kinds of retailers for 2016 revealed that more than half of the top-ten comics franchises were ones aimed at kids. [...] DC is hiring for a new division targeted at young readers, and has already done a bit of a stealth launch by publishing youth-friendly takes on their fabled characters like Supergirl: Being Super and DC Super Hero Girls: Finals Crisis".

Two graphic novels lines were revealed in 2018; the DC Zoom imprint for middle grade readers and the DC Ink for young adult readers. The New York Times reported that "though a few of the graphic novels will have creators who are already working in the comic book industry, the majority of the writers are a Who's Who of popular novelists for young readers. [...] While staple-bound comic books have traditionally appealed to an audience of male readers, graphic novels have a more diverse readership". Michele Wells, the vice president for content strategy at DC, said "if you look at readership in middle grade and Y.A. in general, you'll see a swing on the side of female readers". DC Ink and DC Zoom were created after the New 52 branding was retired in 2015 and the launch of the DCYou program which "employed younger creators than the New 52 titles, with the titles having a more contemporary feel". These imprints were built off both the creative success of DCYou and "the financial success of the DC Super Hero Girls property, which launched in 2015 and featured a line of young reader graphic novels". Dan DiDio, DC's co-publisher from 2010 to 2020, explained that:

A lot of that had also to do with our interest in getting the young adult marketplace. That was DC testing the waters and wondering what a young adult book would be from DC Comics. We realized that ultimately, there was a strong, creative talent pool to tell those stories, but we decided we had to change the format in regards to how it appeared. That's when the DC Ink and DC Zoom books wound up being created, where we knew, This is the right direction, we know there's a market for this, but the periodical might not be the best way to deliver it. That audience might not find the periodical, but let's create it in a book. They're much more comfortable reading in that style.

An expanded list of titles was then revealed at San Diego Comic-Con 2018. In 2019, DC Zoom "technically launched with the continuation of DC Super Hero Girls, but the first Zoom debut was [...] Super Sons: The Polarshield Project".

=== Relaunch ===
DC Comics began to shutter its three imprint lines and separate graphic novel titles by a three-tiered age system in June 2019: DC Zoom would become DC Kids (ages 8–12), DC Ink would become DC (ages 13+), and Vertigo would become DC Black Label (17+). The new segmentation launched in January 2020; the names of the segments also shifted to DC Graphic Novels for Kids and DC Graphic Novels for Young Adults. Later in October, DC Comics released a new boxset of select DC Zoom titles with the DC Graphic Novels for Kids branding on the slipcase.

== Releases ==
Graphic novels
Title	Publication date	Writer	Artist	Ref.
DC Zoom
DC Super Hero Girls: Search for Atlantis	September 26, 2018	Shea Fontana	Yancey Labat	
Super Sons Book One: The Polarshield Project	April 2, 2019	Ridley Pearson	Ile Gonzalez	
DC Super Hero Girls: Spaced Out	May 29, 2019	Shea Fontana	Agnes Garbowska	
Dear Justice League	August 6, 2019	Michael Northrop	Gustavo Duarte	
Superman of Smallville	September 3, 2019	Franco Aureliani and Art Baltazar	Art Baltazar	
The Secret Spiral of Swamp Kid	October 1, 2019	Kirk Scroggs		
DC Super Hero Girls: At Metropolis High	October 15, 2019	Amy Wolfram	Yancey Labat	
Black Canary: Ignite	October 29, 2019	Meg Cabot	Cara McGee	
Super Sons Book Two: The Foxglove Mission	October 29, 2019	Ridley Pearson	Ile Gonzalez	
DC Graphic Novels for Kids
Diana: Princess of the Amazons	January 7, 2020	Shannon Hale; Dean Hale	Victoria Ying	
Green Lantern: Legacy	January 21, 2020	Minh Le	Andie Tong	
Batman Tales: Once Upon a Crime	February 11, 2020	Derek Fridolfs	Dustin Nguyen	
Zatanna and the House of Secrets	February 18, 2020	Matthew Cody	Yoshi Yoshitani	
Batman: Overdrive	March 3, 2020	Shea Fontana	Marcelo Di Chiara	
DC Super Hero Girls: Powerless	March 17, 2020	Amy Wolfram	Agnes Garbowska	
Anti/Hero	April 14, 2020	Demitria Lunetta; Kate Karyus Quinn	Maca Gil	
My Video Game Ate My Homework	April 28, 2020	Dustin Hansen		
Superman Smashes the Klan	May 12, 2020	Gene Luen Yang	Gurihiru	
Primer	June 23, 2020	Thomas Krajewski; Jennifer Muro	Gretel Lusky	
Teen Titans Go! To Camp	August 4, 2020	Sholly Fisch	Marcelo Di Chiara	
Lois Lane and the Friendship Challenge	August 11, 2020	Grace Ellis	Brittney Williams	
DC Super Hero Girls: Midterms	September 1, 2020	Amy Wolfram	Yancey Labat	
Super Sons Book Three: Escape to Landis	October 6, 2020	Ridley Pearson	Ile Gonzalez	
Teen Titans Go! Roll With It!	November 10, 2020	P.C. Morrissey; Heather Nuhfer	Sandy Jarrell; Agnes Garbowska	
ArkhaManiacs	December 8, 2020	Franco Aureliani; Art Baltazar	Art Baltazar	
We Found a Monster	January 12, 2021	Kirk Scroggs		
Flash Facts	February 2, 2021	Sholly Fisch, Varian Johnson, Darian Johnson, Amy Chu, Dustin Hansen, Amanda Deibert, Vita Ayala, Cecil Castellucci, Corinna Bechko, Michael Northrop and Kirk Scroggs	Isaac Goodhart, Vic Regis, Ile Gonzalez, Dustin Hansen, Erich Owen, Andie Tong, Devyn Hansen, Gretel Lusky, Yesenia Moises, Yancey Labat, Monica Kubina and Kirk Scroggs	
Dear DC Super-Villains	April 6, 2021	Michael Northrop	Gustavo Duarte	
Metropolis Grove	May 4, 2021	Drew Brockington		
The Mystery of the Meanest Teacher: A Johnny Constantine Graphic Novel	June 29, 2021	Ryan North	Derek Charm	
DC Super Hero Girls: Ghosting	September 7, 2021	Amanda Deibert	Yancey Labat	
Amethyst: Princess of Gemworld	November 9, 2021	Dean Hale; Shannon Hale	Asiah Fulmore	
Batman and Robin and Howard	November 9, 2021	Jeffrey Brown		
Teen Titans Go!/DC Super Hero Girls: Exchange Students!	January 25, 2022	Amy Wolfram	Agnes Garbowska	
Green Arrow: Stranded	March 8, 2022	Brendan Deneen	Bell Hosalla	
Green Lantern: Alliance	April 26, 2022	Minh Le	Andie Tong	
Batman's Mystery Casebook	August 30, 2022	Sholly Fisch	Christopher Uminga	
My Buddy, Killer Croc	September 6, 2022	Sara Farizan	Nicoletta Baldari	
Deadman Tells the Spooky Tales	September 27, 2022	Franco Aureliani	Sara Richard	
Shazam! Thundercrack	November 29, 2022	Yehudi Mercado		
Bruce Wayne: Not Super	March 14, 2023	Stuart Gibbs	Berat Pekmezci	
Fann Club: Batman Squad	June 6, 2023	Jim Benton		
Clark & Lex	August 1, 2023	Brendan Reichs	Jerry Gaylord	
Teen Titans Go! To the Library!	January 2, 2024	Franco Aureliani; Art Baltazar	Franco Aureliani	
Barkham Asylum	May 7, 2024	Yehudi Mercado		
Teen Titans Go! on TV!	January 7, 2025	Amanda Deibert	Agnes Garboska	
Harley Quinn's Bud and Lou: Trouble Times Two	March 4, 2025	Ben Hed		
Jimmy Olsen's SuperCyclopedia	April 1, 2025	Gabe Soria	Sandy Jarell	
DC's Misfits of Magic	May 6, 2025	Matthew Dow Smith		
Kanga-U: Tests and Tournaments	June 3, 2025	Sholly Fisch	Yancey Labat	
Kid Flash: Going Rogue	February 3, 2026	Steve Foxe	Jerry Gaylord	
Kanga-U: Lost in a Labyrinth	March 3, 2026	Sholly Fisch	Yancey Labat	
Supergirl's Family Vacation	May 5, 2026	Brandon T. Snider	Sarah Leuver	
DC Super Hero Girls: High School Reunion	June 2, 2026	Shea Fontana	Yancey Labat	
Lex Luthor: Diabolical Genius	July 7, 2026	Christof Bogacs	Valerio Chiola	
Bruce Wayne: Not Super: The Bat-Catastrophe	September 1, 2026	Stuart Gibbs	Berat Pekmezci	
C.O.R.T.: Children of the Round Table	October 6, 2026	Tom Taylor	Daniele Di Nicuolo	
Kanga-U: Tricks and Transformation	November 3, 2026	Sholly Fisch	Yancey Labat	
Upcoming

== Reprints ==
DC Graphic Novels for Kids releases
Graphic novels
Title	Publication date	Writer	Artist	Ref.
Released
DC Super Hero Girls: Weird Science	July 14, 2020	Amanda Deibert	Yancey Labat	
Supergirl: Cosmic Adventures in the 8th Grade	September 1, 2020	Landry Walker	Eric Jones	
Batman and Robin and Howard: Summer Breakdown	September 3, 2024	Jeffrey Brown		
Primer: Clashing Colors	November 5, 2024	Jennifer Muro; Tom Krajewski	Gretel Lusky	
Supergirl: Cosmic Adventures in the 8th Grade (New Edition)	August 5, 2025	Landry Walker	Eric Jones	
Little Batman: Month One	November 4, 2025	Morgan Evans	Jon Mikel	
Upcoming
