= The DUFF =

2015 American teen comedy film

- Theatrical release poster
- Directed by: Ari Sandel
- Screenplay by: Josh A. Cagan
- Based on: The DUFF by Kody Keplinger
- Produced by: Susan Cartsonis; McG; Mary Viola
- Starring: Mae Whitman; Robbie Amell; Bella Thorne; Bianca Santos; Skyler Samuels; Romany Malco; Ken Jeong; Allison Janney
- Cinematography: David Hennings
- Edited by: Wendy Greene Bricmont
- Music by: Dominic Lewis
- Production companies: Vast Entertainment; CBS Films; Wonderland Sound and Vision
- Distributed by: Lionsgate
- Release dates: February 12, 2015 (Los Angeles); February 20, 2015 (United States)
- Running time: 101 minutes
- Country: United States
- Language: English
- Budget: $8.5 million
- Box office: $43.7 million

The DUFF is a 2015 American coming-of-age teen-comedy film directed by Ari Sandel from a screenplay by Josh Cagan. Based on the 2010 novel of the same name by Kody Keplinger, it stars Mae Whitman, Robbie Amell, Bella Thorne, Bianca Santos, Skyler Samuels, Romany Malco, Ken Jeong, and Allison Janney. In the film, Bianca (Whitman) instigates a social makeover after finding out that she has been labeled "the DUFF" ("Designated Ugly Fat Friend") by her high-school classmates.

In November 2011, CBS Films acquired the film rights to Keplinger's novel, and Cagan's then-unproduced screenplay featured on that year's Black List of best unproduced screenplays. Sandel was hired as director in May 2013, with the film being co-produced by Vast Entertainment and Wonderland Sound and Vision. Whitman was cast in April 2014, and the main cast was rounded out by that June. Principal photography began in June 2014 and concluded one month later, with filming primarily taking place across Atlanta.

The DUFF first premiered in Los Angeles on February 12, 2015, and was then theatrically released in the United States on February 20, by Lionsgate. It received positive reviews from critics, with praise for Whitman's performance, and is now considered a cult film. It grossed $43.7 million worldwide.

== Plot ==
Bianca is enjoying her senior year of high school in the suburbs of Atlanta with her two best friends, Jess and Casey, who are both significantly more popular than her. Her neighbor is Wesley, the captain of the football team, who was her childhood friend.

Bianca reluctantly attends a party hosted by mean girl Madison, Wesley's "on-again, off-again" girlfriend, with hopes of talking to her guitar-playing crush Toby. At the party, Wesley casually brings to Bianca's awareness that she is the "DUFF" of her friend group—an acronym which stands for Designated Ugly Fat Friend. He explains that the DUFF does not necessarily have to be ugly or fat, it is merely the person in a social group who is less popular, and therefore more accessible, than the others in the group. Bianca is insulted and devastated, but she soon realizes Wesley is right: the students in her high school are only interested in her as a way to get to Jess and Casey.

She takes her anger out on Jess and Casey and "unfriends" them on social media and in person. She later overhears Wesley's science teacher Mr. Fillmore telling Wesley that unless he passes the midterm, he is off the football team, which could cost him his football scholarship. Desperate to up her social standing and go on a date with her crush, Bianca strikes a deal with Wesley: she will help him pass his class if he helps her socially. The two have a fun time at the mall, attempting a makeover by buying new clothes.

Secretly, Madison's henchgirl records Bianca embarrassingly playing around in her new clothes and pretending that a mannequin is Toby. Madison posts the video online to embarrass Bianca because she has become possessive of Wesley and jealous of Bianca's relationship with him. Wesley suggests Bianca just "own" the video and be upfront with Toby, talking directly to him and asking him out. She takes the advice and, to her surprise, he accepts. Bianca takes Wesley to her favorite spot in the forest, her "think rock", to get him away from the constant arguing between his parents, and to help him cope with a possible divorce. They kiss, but joke about it, and pretend it didn't mean anything.

Bianca and Toby have a date at his house, where she finds herself thinking about Wesley but tries to brush it off. By the end of the date, she discovers that Toby has been "DUFFing" her; that is, spending time with her in order to connect with Jess and Casey. She confronts him as the shallow and superficial person he has revealed himself to be, and leaves in tears. While looking for Wesley, to talk with him about the date, she finds him at the thinking rock kissing Madison.

Furious with both boys, Bianca reunites with her girl friends, who were actually genuine all along. They, along with her understanding mother, Dottie, convince her to go to the homecoming dance with them in a dress they create together which incorporates elements of her previous wardrobe, such as her plaid flannel shirts. At the dance, Bianca uses Wesley's advice to be upfront, and tells him that she likes him. However, he regrettably informs her that he is back with Madison, who approaches the two of them and begins to hurl insults at Bianca.

Bianca delivers her final speech to Madison, finally confronting her and proclaiming that everybody is a DUFF because there is always someone "better", and they should be true to their own identity. Additionally, Madison's bullying is just a reflection of her own insecurities about herself. When Madison is crowned homecoming queen and Wesley king, he hesitates before rejecting the title, instead choosing to kiss Bianca in front of the whole school.

Bianca's article about homecoming and her experience is a hit with the students. Bianca is accepted to Northwestern University while Wesley attends Ohio State. They go out for dinner as a couple.

== Cast ==
- Mae Whitman as Bianca
- Robbie Amell as Wesley
- Bella Thorne as Madison
- Bianca Santos as Casey
- Skyler Samuels as Jess
- Romany Malco as Principal Buchanan
- Nick Eversman as Toby
- Chris Wylde as Mr. Filmore
- Ken Jeong as Mr. Arthur
- Allison Janney as Dottie
- Rebecca Weil as Caitlyn
- Seth Meriwether as A. J.
- Erick Chavarria as Señor Gomez
- J.J. Green as Trevor
- Murielle Telio as Mariah
- Mahaley Manning as Kara
- Demetrius Bridges as Jarrett

== Production ==
=== Screenplay and casting ===
In November 2011, CBS Films acquired the rights to the novel of the same name by Kody Keplinger. Josh A. Cagan was enlisted to adapt the book into a script. He decided to use the Kübler-Ross model of five emotional stages to make a better transition of the narrative part. The script featured on the Black List of best unproduced screenplays of 2011.

Ari Sandel became attached to the project in May 2013. On April 9, 2014, Mae Whitman was cast in the lead; Keplinger had envisioned Whitman in the role even before the book's release, after watching her on Parenthood. The cast grew with the addition of Bella Thorne on April 30, Ken Jeong on May 12, Skyler Samuels on May 22, Robbie Amell and Bianca A. Santos on May 27, and Allison Janney on June 10.

=== Filming ===
Principal photography began in Atlanta, Georgia, in June 2014 and ended on July 9, 2014. Shooting locations included Henry W. Grady High School, Marietta High School, Perimeter Mall, the Cobb Energy Performing Arts Centre, Stone Mountain Park, and a local Dave and Buster's.

=== Soundtrack ===
The official motion picture soundtrack for The DUFF was released digitally on February 17, 2015, by Island Records.

| No. | Title | Artist(s) | Length |
|---|---|---|---|
| 1. | "Made in Gold" | Nova Rockafeller | 3:36 |
| 2. | "Jealous (The Rooftop Boys Remix)" | Nick Jonas | 4:13 |
| 3. | "How Come You Don't Want Me" | Tegan and Sara | 2:51 |
| 4. | "Favorite Record" | Fall Out Boy | 3:23 |
| 5. | "All Night" | Icona Pop | 3:07 |
| 6. | "Somebody to You" | The Vamps | 3:02 |
| 7. | "Nothing Left to Lose" | Kari Kimmel | 3:36 |
| 8. | "Heavy Mood" | Tilly and the Wall | 3:12 |
| 9. | "Sexy Silk" | Jessie J | 2:40 |
| 10. | "Kill the Band" | Junkie XL featuring Joost van Bellen | 4:59 |
| 11. | "I Own It" | Nacey featuring Angel Haze | 3:08 |
| 12. | "#Selfie" | The Chainsmokers | 3:04 |
| Total length: | | | 40:58 |

== Release ==
The film was released on February 20, 2015, by CBS Films via Lionsgate. It was then released on digital HD on May 26, 2015, before the film's DVD and Blu-ray release on June 9, 2015, by Lionsgate Home Entertainment.

The DUFF grossed $34 million in the United States and Canada, and $9.7 million in other territories, for a worldwide total of $43.7 million, against a budget of $8.5 million.

In North America, the film debuted at number five in its first weekend, with $10.8 million, finishing behind Fifty Shades of Grey, Kingsman: The Secret Service, The SpongeBob Movie: Sponge Out of Water, and McFarland, USA.

== Reception ==
The film received mostly positive reviews from critics. On Rotten Tomatoes, 73% of 120 critics gave the film a positive review and an average rating of 6.1/10. The site's critics consensus states: "The DUFF doesn't achieve teen-movie greatness, but offers enough of a postmodern twist on the genre to recommend—and boasts typically great work from star Mae Whitman." On Metacritic, the film has a weighted average score of 56 out of 100 based on 28 reviews, indicating "mixed or average reviews". Audiences surveyed by CinemaScore gave the film a grade "A−" on scale of A to F.

Lindsey Bahr of the Associated Press gave the film a positive review, saying "While it's neither as biting as Mean Girls nor as sweetly referential as Easy A, the earnest and sometimes amusing The DUFF is a fine addition to the canon." Sheri Linden of The Hollywood Reporter gave the film a positive review, saying "Its central pair of unlikely allies will engage young audiences' sympathy. They're smartly played by Mae Whitman and Robbie Amell, whose warmth and comic chops keep the movie buoyant." Kevin P. Sullivan of Entertainment Weekly gave the film a B−, saying "The DUFF won't stay with you far past its runtime. But as a vehicle, it's ample proof that we should be seeing more of Mae Whitman." Amy Nicholson of LA Weekly gave the film a C, saying "The DUFF doesn't seem to know what its point actually is. It's pro-self-acceptance and also pro-makeover. It's about liking yourself, and how you'd like yourself better with a boyfriend." Inkoo Kang of TheWrap gave the film a positive review, saying "Mae Whitman reveals herself to be one of the funniest actresses of her generation in a spot-on and endlessly quotable take on teenage 'dramz' in 2015." Michael Phillips of the Chicago Tribune gave the film two out of four stars, saying "You know what would be revolutionary? Making a really good movie about a three-dimensional teenage female character that doesn't start and finish with both eyes on the same old punishing character types."

Ann Hornaday of The Washington Post gave the film zero stars out of four, saying "What might have been a frank portrayal of high school culture and challenges ends up veering between being either too cynically hyper-sexual or preachy." Rafer Guzman of Newsday gave the film three and a half out of four stars, saying "A smart, funny, straight-talking teen movie in the John Hughes tradition. Oodles of charm from the young cast." Claudia Puig of USA Today gave the film two out of four stars, saying "Mae Whitman is the best thing here, and the funny actress deserves better material than what's offered in this derivative and superficial ode to teen self-acceptance." Betsy Sharkey of the Los Angeles Times gave the film a negative review, saying "Romance, or the desire to find someone special, isn't a bad thing—if it's not the only thing. But as it stands in DUFF, the denouement at prom has cliché written all over it." Christy Lemire of RogerEbert.com gave the film three out of four stars, saying "Whitman displays flawless comic timing and consistently makes inspiring choices in terms of delivery, reaction, even the slightest facial expression. She shines confidently in a self-deprecating role, and it's irresistible." Bilge Ebiri of New York magazine gave the film a positive review, saying "Why is it so wonderful? Because wit and charm matter, and The DUFF has a good deal of both. The cast will be stars, the gags will be immortal, and you'll still be watching this movie years from now." David Lewis of the San Francisco Chronicle gave the film three out of four stars, saying, "Sandel's film has heart, some good laughs and a decent message. In this age of cyberbullying, that's nothing to scoff at."

=== Accolades ===
| Year | Award | Category | Recipient(s) | Result |
|---|---|---|---|---|
| 2015 | Teen Choice Awards | Choice Movie: Comedy | The DUFF | Nominated |
| 2015 | Teen Choice Awards | Choice Movie: Liplock | Mae Whitman and Robbie Amell | Nominated |
| 2015 | Teen Choice Awards | Choice Movie: Villain | Bella Thorne | Won |
| 2015 | Teen Choice Awards | Choice Movie Actor: Comedy | Robbie Amell | Nominated |
| 2015 | Teen Choice Awards | Choice Movie Actress: Comedy | Mae Whitman | Nominated |
| 2015 | Young Artist Awards | Best Performance in a Feature Film – Supporting Young Actress (14–21) | Bella Thorne | Nominated |
