= The DUFF (novel) =

2010 novel by Kody Keplinger

- First edition cover
- Author: Kody Keplinger
- Language: English
- Genre: Young adult
- Publisher: Poppy
- Publication date: September 7, 2010
- Publication place: United States
- Media type: Print (hardcover, paperback), e-book, audiobook
- Pages: 288
- ISBN: 978-0-316-08423-9

The DUFF is a 2010 young adult novel by American author Kody Keplinger. Keplinger was 17 when she wrote the novel, which was released on September 7, 2010. A film based on the novel, also entitled The DUFF, was released on February 20, 2015. A companion novel, Lying Out Loud, was released on April 28, 2015, and is set in the same universe as The DUFF.

== Plot ==
High school student Bianca Piper, along with her friends Casey Blithe and Jessica Gaither, frequent a teen lounge called the Nest. One January night as Casey and Jessica are dancing, another student named Wesley Rush, who has a reputation as a womanizer, approaches Bianca. He explains that he wants people to see him talking with her, because she is the DUFF, the Designated Ugly Fat Friend, and a connection with her will bring other, more attractive women to him. Disgusted, Bianca finds her friends and leaves. A few nights later, however, Wesley approaches Bianca at the club again after Bianca had a particularly bad day, and Bianca spontaneously kisses Wesley in order to distract herself from her problems.

Bianca's mother Gina, a self-help lecturer, has been disappearing for longer and longer periods of time on her business trips, and one day she sends Bianca's father, Mike, divorce papers. This drives Mike Piper to start drinking again and to demolish the living room, and when Wesley plans to come to Bianca's house to work on an English paper together on the novel The Scarlet Letter, Bianca suggests going to Wesley's house instead so that no one discovers about her parents' divorce. In Wesley's room, Bianca kisses him again and ends up sleeping with him. She insists, however, that she hates him, and he continues to address her as "Duffy". Bianca does not tell Casey or Jessica about sleeping with Wesley, or about her parents' divorce.

At school, Jessica says that her older brother Jake is coming to visit, and Bianca remembers an ill-fated affair she once had with Jake. The stirring of this memory prompts her to approach Wesley again for distraction, and soon she starts a casual relationship with him, sleeping with him every few days. She tells him about Jake Gaither, but refuses to tell Jessica or Casey anything and begins to avoid them, though she eventually talks about her parents' divorce. On Valentine's Day, Bianca's longtime crush Toby Tucker begins to pay attention to her, and Gina Piper comes to discuss the divorce with Bianca's father. This causes Mike to relapse into alcoholism. One afternoon at school, Wesley gives Bianca a ride after her car fails to start. Bianca meets Wesley's sister Amy and their grandmother, and learns about Wesley's own family troubles. When they go to Bianca's house, a drunken Mike calls Bianca a "whore", and Bianca ends up going back to Wesley's house and telling him all about her parents' divorce. After spending the night with Wesley, Bianca calls Casey and asks for a ride home, and on the way Bianca tells Casey about her relationship with Wesley (as well as the DUFF concept). Bianca admits that she has feelings for Wesley, and she wonders if she is in love with him.

Mike Piper stops drinking and starts attending Alcoholics Anonymous meetings. Bianca makes up with Jessica and Casey and avoids Wesley altogether, and Toby Tucker asks Bianca out. Toby and Bianca begin dating, but Wesley takes to following Bianca around, leaving her notes, even sending her flowers. On Toby's suggestion, Bianca reads Wuthering Heights. Unexpectedly, she sees her situation between Wesley and Toby as analogous to Catherine Earnshaw's situation, between Heathcliff and Edgar Linton. Bianca also realizes that her status as a DUFF is illusory and unimportant, since other people sometimes act as the odd one in a group and later become popular or successful. She vows to stop judging people, since she wishes to avoid judgment from others. Finally, Toby takes Bianca on a date to the Nest but notices Wesley staring at her, and Toby reveals that he does not feel chemistry with Bianca and is hoping to reconcile with his ex-girlfriend, Nina. Toby and Bianca part amicably, and Bianca joins Wesley at the Nest, requesting that they begin dating like normal people.

== Development ==
The DUFF started as a joke during senior year when Keplinger, who graduated from McLean County High School in 2009, first heard the phrase DUFF, or Designated Ugly Fat Friend. Shortly after Christmas, she walked into the cafeteria one morning. A girl at her table was talking about guys calling her friend "the DUFF." Keplinger did not know what that meant, so when they told her, "I had these three thoughts", she said. "First, 'that's really funny.' Second, 'that's really mean.' Third, 'that's me. I'm the DUFF." "I realized every person thinks they're the DUFF in their group", she said. Jokingly, she told her friends she would write a book called The DUFF.

Keplinger also said in a webcast:

"I started writing the book, because I thought I was the DUFF of my group of friends. But the more I wrote, and the more I began talking to my friends about what I was writing, I realized that every girl has felt like the DUFF at some point or another. Every girl – and maybe boys too – has felt like the least attractive person in the room at some time. So we're not alone in that. It's a lesson that I had to learn, and it's a lesson that Bianca has to learn too."

== Reception ==
Andrea Simakis of The Plain Dealer wrote that the novel "gives off a whiff of promise, like a pleasing sample scent you spray on your wrist at Sephora. It's only hours later, when the odor has become cloying, that you're glad you didn't buy." She felt that it has "some dead-on dialogue, deft writing and entertaining snark", but concluded that "the only true longing in this novel will be from the reader, pining for the clever innocence of Clueless."

Amanda Tew of The Florida Times-Union was more complimentary. She wrote, "I loved the main character and the chemistry she shared with Wesley and her BFFs. Every girl can easily relate to Bianca – we all have felt like the DUFF at some point." She warned, however, "I can't recommend it for all ages. It's a little heavy on sexual content and might give younger girls the wrong idea about appropriate behavior."

The Guardian gave it a positive review: "Although The DUFF contains steamy scenes and a love triangle sure to keep the pages turning, Keplinger addresses more serious themes, too: body image, alcoholism and the sacrifices of friendship. She also has a knack for writing in an authentic teen voice. This very much keeps the book alive."

== Film adaptation ==
A film adaptation of The DUFF, starring Mae Whitman as Bianca and Robbie Amell as Wesley and directed by Ari Sandel, was released on February 20, 2015. It grossed $43.7 million worldwide against a budget of $8.5 million.
