= Little Gloomy =

Comic book series

Trade paperback collecting the first four issues of the Little Gloomy comic series.

Little Gloomy is a comic book published by Slave Labor Graphics. The first issue premiered in October 1999. The series was created by Landry Walker and Eric Jones. Little Gloomy stories also regularly appeared in Disney Adventures Magazine, until the magazine stopped production with its November 2007 issue.

== Characters ==
- Gloomy is a girl who lives in the town of Frightsylvania (a town of monsters) in a house with her friends. Often, the most strange things happen to her, which are mainly caused either by the faults of her friends or the plots of her enemies (though most commonly the latter). In Scary Larry, her name was changed to Victoria and she was also a vampire in this version.
- Larry the Werewolf, is Gloomy's only sensible friend, who often is a key player in getting Gloomy out of trouble. He is sometimes used as Frank's straight man. He is the protagonist of Scary Larry.
- Frank, a miniature Frankenstein's Monster, is selfish and is often more trouble than the situation is worth. He thinks only of himself when his friends matter the most, and sometimes ends up rescuing Gloomy and friends by accident.
- Mummy is another one of Gloomy's friends. He owns a bar and speaks entirely in hieroglyphics. In Scary Larry, the character was changed to female and was given the name Cleo.
- Carl Cthulhu is a cthulhu monster that loves bunnies and claims that he will one day destroy all life. In Scary Larry, Carl became an alien with an Italian accent, but his love for bunnies retained.
- Simon Von Simon is Little Gloomy's bitter ex-boyfriend seeking revenge. He controls an army of zombies.
- Evey, The Rotton Witch was formerly Little Gloomy's best friend, until she discovered she could gain greater magical power and immortality by sacrificing Gloomy to the dark gods. In Scary Larry, she was not depicted to be a witch (although she possesses a black cat) and was still friends with Victoria up until the end of her debut.
- Lily is a sea creature that usually goes on vacations with Gloomy but they usually get in trouble. She is shown as very vain and selfish. In Scary Larry, she is the landlady of the band.
- Shelly is the brain damaged result of Simon Von Simon's experiment to trap Gloomy's mind into a new, bride of Frankenstein type body. Her name is derived from the last name of Frankenstein author Mary Shelley.

== Goth subculture ==
Due to the design of the central character and association through the Slave Labor Graphics publishing imprint, Little Gloomy is often labeled specifically as a goth-related comic. As such, it was one of the first to reach mainstream audiences with regular distribution through Disney Adventures.

== TV series ==
In 2010, Timoon Animation (now Technicolor Animation Productions) and 1492 Pictures announced a $7 million budgeted animated series based on Little Gloomy called Scary Larry. The 26-episode series debuted in France on Canal+ on September 2, 2012. The series debuted in the United States on KidsClick on July 1, 2017, and aired until December 10, 2017. The series debuted in Argentina in May 2013

== Other ==
- In 2005 Walker and Jones published a new "Little Gloomy" series called "The Super Scary Monster Show: Featuring Little Gloomy" which contains short stories separate from the "Little Gloomy" story
- In 2006, Little Gloomy was optioned by 1492 Pictures.
- Walker and Jones had another regular Disney Adventures feature titled Kid Gravity. In the universe of Kid Gravity, Little Gloomy is a fictional character and The Super Scary Monster Show is Kid Gravity's favorite television program.
- There have been two toys from the comic to date. Carl Cthulhu and Mummy.
