= Poison Ivy: Thorns =

2021 DC Comics graphic novel

- Front cover of Poison Ivy: Thorns
- Date: June 1, 2021
- Page count: 208 pages
- Publisher: DC Comics

Creative team
- Writer: Kody Keplinger
- Artist: Sara Kipin
- Letterer: Steve Wands
- Colorist: Jeremy Lawson
- ISBN: 978-1-4012-9842-5

Poison Ivy: Thorns is a 2021 young adult gothic-horror graphic novel written by Kody Keplinger, with art by Sara Kipin. It was published by DC Comics on June 1, 2021 as part of their DC Graphic Novels for Young Adults line. The graphic novel tells the origin story of Poison Ivy, focusing on her teenage years.

== Production ==
Poison Ivy: Thorns was written by Kody Keplinger, with art by Sara Kipin, lettering by Steve Wands, and coloring by Jeremy Lawson. It tells the origin story of the DC Comics character Poison Ivy, focusing on her teenage years.

Poison Ivy had been Keplinger's favorite comic book character since she was young, with the writer stating that the bisexual Ivy "feels tailor made for [her] interests as a nature-loving, gay makeup enthusiast". Keplinger was keen to write for the character and Poison Ivy: Thorns was the result of her pitch to DC Comics for a modern Gothic story about Ivy. Keplinger's intention was to write "an angsty gothic romance" that her teenage self would have loved, and her influences for the novel included "queer gothic literature" such as Sarah Waters' Fingersmith. Keplinger also noted that DC Comics gave her a lot of freedom to reimagine Ivy's origins, and she drew inspiration from the character's previous iterations. Other DC characters do not appear in the novel, as the creators wanted Ivy to be the sole focus of the story.

Kipin described the graphic novel as an "LGBT horror stor[y]", and the artist found it easy to relate to Ivy, using her own experiences as "a moody LGBT teen" to flesh out the character.

The graphic novel was published by DC Comics on June 1, 2021, as part of a Pride Month initiative.

== Synopsis ==
The story follows a teenage Pamela Isley, who is presented as a shy and withdrawn young woman who is constantly abused and tormented by the men in her life. At school, she is bullied by a popular male classmate she briefly dated but later dumped, to which the principal turns a blind eye. At home, she is forced to act as a test subject for numerous experiments by her father in his increasingly futile efforts to cure Pamela's mother of a terminal illness. Pamela slowly begins to feel less and less human as she turns to the vast array of plants growing in her father's lab for companionship, using them to teach herself the science of botany.

Eventually, her relationship with another student named Alice convinces Pamela to take control of her life. Through genetic manipulation and her knowledge of plant life, she transforms herself into a plant-human hybrid and takes revenge on her father, the principal, and her old boyfriend. Renouncing her humanity forever, she renames herself "Poison Ivy" and sets out to fulfill her dream of a world where plants can exist free from the evils of human civilization.

== Critical reception ==
Benton Jones' review for Comic Book Resources praised the "impressively complex narrative" that portrays Ivy as a sympathetic yet dark character. On the other hand, ComicBookWire found that the attempt to portray Ivy as both a hero and a villain resulted in a contradictory characterization. Publishers Weekly was critical of Keplinger's writing, particularly her overuse of storytelling tropes, but enjoyed the visual elements that Kipin and Lawson brought to the book. Kirkus Reviews found the novel "[a]tmospheric and haunting", and wrote that it "manages to bring heart to an antihero". In a review for the School Library Journal, Carla Riemer concluded that Poison Ivy: Thorns provides an "intriguing and sympathetic" backstory for the DC Comics villain.
