= Howard Huang =

Taiwanese photographer

Howard Huang (born in Taiwan, 1972) is an American commercial photographer based out of the New York City area, where he runs his own full-service studio in Williamsburg, Brooklyn. Known for his work associated with the urban culture and hip hop celebrities, he has collaborated on projects with book titles and authors such as The Princess Diaries, Lauren Conrad Style, Confession of Georgia Nicolson, Wes Craven, Lemony Snicket, E, and Lynn Harris.

Huang was born in Taiwan and raised in Honolulu, Hawaii. He received his bachelor's degree from the Academy of Arts College in San Francisco and moved to New York City in 1997 to assist commercial photography pioneer Michel Tcherevkoff (a disciple of Pete Turner).

His work is published in magazines such as Teen Vogue, Seventeen Magazine, XXL, Maxim Magazine, The Village Voice, The New Yorker, Urban Ink, Blackmen, and The Source. He has worked with many celebrities including: Nicki Minaj, Lil Wayne, Akon, Nelly, Ashanti, Mario, Wiz Khalifa, Fabolous, Busta Rhymes, Pitbull, Timbaland, Cassidy, Soulja Boy, Chad Ochocinco, Daniel Gibson, Keri Hilson, Keyshia Cole, Mýa, Ciara, Bow Wow, Jim Jones, Juelz Santana, and Nick Cannon.

Recent ad campaign includes Nicki Minaj's Pink Friday Fragrance and Myx Fusions Moscato.

In 2010, his first photography book “Urban Girls” was published by Taschen, and edited by Dian Hanson.

== See also ==
- Taiwanese art
