= DC Graphic Novels for Young Adults =

Imprint of DC Comics

- Parent company: DC Comics
- Status: Active
- Predecessor: DC Ink (2019)
- Founded: 2020; 6 years ago
- Founder: Michele R. Wells
- Country of origin: United States
- Headquarters location: New York City
- Publication types: Graphic novel, one-shot comics
- Fiction genres: Action; Adventure; Crime; Drama; Fantasy; Mystery; Supernatural; Science fiction; Superhero; Young adult
- Official website: dccomics.com/GraphicNovelsForYA

DC Graphic Novels for Young Adults, formerly known as DC Ink, is an imprint of American comic book publisher DC Comics consisting of original one-shots, graphic novels and reprints of books previously published under other imprints. The imprint intends to present traditional DC Universe characters for young adult readers. The first title of the DC Ink imprint, Mera: Tidebreaker, was published on February 2, 2019 and Batman: Nightwalker was the last title to be published under DC Ink. Wonder Woman: Warbringer, the first title of DC Graphic Novels for Young Adults, was published on January 10, 2020.

== History ==
=== Launch ===
DC Ink original logo

In 2017, DC Comics announced that a new untitled young readers imprint would launch in 2018. Abraham Riesman, for Vulture, highlighted a shift in audience for graphic novels that did not have to do with either Marvel or DC Comics; Riesman wrote that "shift was the result of decisions made by librarians, teachers, kids'-book publishers, and people born after the year 2000. Abruptly, the most important sector in the world of sequential art has become graphic novels for young people. [...] According to Milton Griepp of comics-industry analysis site ICv2, aggregated annual comics sales across different kinds of retailers for 2016 revealed that more than half of the top-ten comics franchises were ones aimed at kids. [...] DC is hiring for a new division targeted at young readers, and has already done a bit of a stealth launch by publishing youth-friendly takes on their fabled characters like Supergirl: Being Super and DC Super Hero Girls: Finals Crisis".

Two graphic novels lines were revealed in 2018; the DC Zoom imprint for middle grade readers and the DC Ink imprint for young adult readers. The New York Times reported that "though a few of the graphic novels will have creators who are already working in the comic book industry, the majority of the writers are a Who's Who of popular novelists for young readers. [...] While staple-bound comic books have traditionally appealed to an audience of male readers, graphic novels have a more diverse readership". Michele Wells, the vice president for content strategy at DC, said "if you look at readership in middle grade and Y.A. in general, you'll see a swing on the side of female readers". DC Ink and DC Zoom were created after the New 52 branding was retired in 2015 and the launch of the DCYou program which "employed younger creators than the New 52 titles, with the titles having a more contemporary feel". These imprints were built off both the creative success of DCYou and "the financial success of the DC Super Hero Girls property, which launched in 2015 and featured a line of young reader graphic novels". Dan DiDio, DC's co-publisher from 2010-2020, explained that:

A lot of that had also to do with our interest in getting the young adult marketplace. That was DC testing the waters and wondering what a young adult book would be from DC Comics. We realized that ultimately, there was a strong, creative talent pool to tell those stories, but we decided we had to change the format in regards to how it appeared. That's when the DC Ink and DC Zoom books wound up being created, where we knew, This is the right direction, we know there's a market for this, but the periodical might not be the best way to deliver it. That audience might not find the periodical, but let's create it in a book. They're much more comfortable reading in that style.

An expanded list of titles was then revealed at San Diego Comic-Con 2018. In 2019, DC Ink officially launched with five graphic novels starting with Mera: Tidebreaker in February.

=== Relaunch ===
DC Comics began to shutter its three imprint lines and separate graphic novel titles by a three-tiered age system in June 2019: DC Zoom would become DC Kids (ages 8–12), DC Ink would become DC (ages 13+), and Vertigo would become DC Black Label (17+). The new segmentation launched in January 2020, although, the names of the segments shifted to DC Graphic Novels for Kids and DC Graphic Novels for Young Adults respectively. Later in October, DC Comics released a new boxset of select DC Ink titles with the DC Graphic Novels for Young Adults branding on the slipcase.

== Releases ==
Title	Publication date	Writer	Artist	Ref.
DC Ink
Mera: Tidebreaker	February 2, 2019	Danielle Paige	Stephen Byrne	
Under the Moon: A Catwoman Tale	May 1, 2019	Lauren Myracle	Isaac Goodhart	
Teen Titans: Raven	June 26, 2019	Kami Garcia	Gabriel Picolo	
Harley Quinn: Breaking Glass	September 3, 2019	Mariko Tamaki	Steve Pugh	
Batman: Nightwalker	October 1, 2019	Stuart Moore and Marie Lu	Chris Wildgoose	
DC Graphic Novels for Young Adults
Wonder Woman: Warbringer	January 7, 2020	Louise Simonson and Leigh Bardugo	Kit Seaton	
Shadow of the Batgirl	February 4, 2020	Sarah Kuhn	Nicole Goux	
The Oracle Code	March 10, 2020	Marieke Nijkamp	Manuel Preitano	
Gotham High	April 7, 2020	Melissa de la Cruz	Thomas Pitilli	
The Lost Carnival: A Dick Grayson Graphic Novel	May 5, 2020	Michael Moreci	Sas Milledge	
Wonder Woman: Tempest Tossed	June 2, 2020	Laurie Halse Anderson	Leila del Duca	
You Brought Me The Ocean	June 9, 2020	Alex Sánchez	Jul Maroh	
Teen Titans: Beast Boy	September 1, 2020	Kami Garcia	Gabriel Picolo	
Swamp Thing: Twin Branches	October 13, 2020	Maggie Stiefvater	Morgan Beem	
Victor and Nora: A Gotham Love Story	November 3, 2020	Lauren Myracle	Isaac Goodhart	
House of El Book One: The Shadow Threat	January 5, 2021	Claudia Gray	Eric Zawadzki	
Nubia: Real One	February 23, 2021	L.L. McKinney	Robyn Smith	
Catwoman: Soulstealer	June 1, 2021	Sarah J. Maas and Louise Simonson	Samantha Dodge	
Poison Ivy: Thorns	June 1, 2021	Kody Keplinger	Sara Kipin	
I Am Not Starfire	July 27, 2021	Mariko Tamaki	Yoshi Yoshitani	
Whistle: A New Gotham City Hero	September 7, 2021	E. Lockhart	Manuel Preitano	
Unearthed: A Jessica Cruz Story	September 14, 2021	Lilliam Rivera	Steph C.	
Teen Titans: Beast Boy Loves Raven	September 28, 2021	Kami Garcia	Gabriel Picolo	
Wonderful Women of the World	September 28, 2021	Laurie Halse Anderson, Various	Various	
House of El Book Two: The Enemy Delusion	January 11, 2022	Claudia Gray	Eric Zawadzki	
Mister Miracle: The Great Escape	January 25, 2022	Varian Johnson	Daniel Isles	
Galaxy: The Prettiest Star	May 17, 2022	Jadzia Axelrod	Cait Zellers	
Constantine: Distorted Illusions	July 26, 2022	Kami Garcia	Isaac Goodhart	
Zatanna: The Jewel of Gravesend	August 2, 2022	Alys Arden	Jacquelin De Leon	
House of El Book Three: The Treacherous Hope	February 7, 2023	Claudia Gray	Eric Zawadzki	
Teen Titans: Robin	March 7, 2023	Kami Garcia	Gabriel Picolo	
Girl Taking Over: A Lois Lane Story	April 4, 2023	Sarah Kuhn	Arielle Jovellanos	
Static: Up All Night	June 6, 2023	Lamar Giles	Paris Alleyne	
Bad Dream: A Dreamer Story	April 2, 2024	Nicole Maines	Rye Hickman	
Superman: The Harvests of Youth	October 3, 2023	Sina Grace		
Barda	June 4, 2024	Ngozi Ukazu		
The Strange Case of Harleen and Harley	October 1, 2024	Melissa Marr	Jenn St-Onge	
This Land Is Our Land: A Blue Beetle Story	October 1, 2024	Julio Anta	Jacoby Salcedo	
Teen Titans: Starfire	November 5, 2024	Kami Garcia	Gabriel Picolo	
Nubia: Too Real	September 30, 2025	L.L. McKinney	Robyn Smith & Manou Azumi	
Galaxy 2: As The World Falls Down	May 5, 2026	Jadzia Axelrod	Cait Zellers	
Orion	July 7, 2026	Ngozi Ukazu		
Teen Titans: Together	August 4, 2026	Kami Garcia	Gabriel Picolo	
Birds of Prey: The Origins	November 3, 2026	Sara Shepard	Stephanie Pepper	
Upcoming
Young Justice: Kid Flash & Blue Beetle	TBA	Kami Garcia	Gabriel Picolo	

=== Reprints ===
Title	Publication date	Writer	Artist	Ref.
Superman Smashes the Klan	June 16, 2020	Gene Luen Yang	Gurihiru	
Supergirl: Being Super	July 7, 2020	Mariko Tamaki	Joëlle Jones	
Prez: Setting a Dangerous President	June 4, 2024	Mark Russell	Ben Caldwell	
Wonder Woman: The Adventures of Young Diana	August 6, 2024	Jordie Bellaire	Paulina Ganucheau	
Mystik U: Freshman Year Enchantments	March 4, 2025	Alisa Kwitney	Mike Norton	

=== Box sets ===
Title		Publication date	Writer	Artist	Ref.
Resist. Revolt. Rebel.	Under the Moon: A Catwoman Tale	October 20, 2020	Lauren Myracle	Isaac Goodhart	
Resist. Revolt. Rebel.	Harley Quinn: Breaking Glass	October 20, 2020	Mariko Tamaki	Steve Pugh	
Resist. Revolt. Rebel.	Mera: Tidebreaker	October 20, 2020	Danielle Paige	Stephen Byrne	
Teen Titans	Teen Titans: Raven	September 13, 2022	Kami Garcia	Gabriel Picolo	
Teen Titans	Teen Titans: Beast Boy	September 13, 2022	Kami Garcia	Gabriel Picolo	
Teen Titans	Teen Titans: Beast Boy Loves Raven	September 13, 2022	Kami Garcia	Gabriel Picolo	
The DC Icons Series: The Graphic Novel Box Set	Batman: Nightwalker	November 7, 2023	Stuart Moore and Marie Lu	Chris Wildgoose	
The DC Icons Series: The Graphic Novel Box Set	Catwoman: Soulstealer	November 7, 2023	Sarah J. Maas and Louise Simonson	Samantha Dodge	
The DC Icons Series: The Graphic Novel Box Set	Wonder Woman: Warbringer	November 7, 2023	Louise Simonson and Leigh Bardugo	Kit Seaton	

== Reception ==
Oliver Sava, for The A.V. Club, highlighted the puzzling shift of eliminating the Ink and Zoom imprints shortly after launch and right when new titles were "realizing their potential". Sava wrote that "having those clearly defined channels makes it easier for retailers, librarians, educators, and consumers to find the books that are appropriate for different age groups. The Ink and Zoom branding is still present on new releases, so maybe the market's response will change DC's plans to phase out the imprints as it gears up for its huge slate of upcoming graphic novels for young readers. And the market is responding very well. The Ink and Zoom books are in the top 10 of Diamond's graphic novel sales charts for each month they debut, and given the popularity of Harley Quinn and Superman, that trend is likely to continue with August's debuts".

Heidi MacDonald, for The Beat, wrote: "DC Comics is re-branding all its publishing under the DC brand [...]. The announcement confirms recent rumors that Vertigo, the much admired and industry changing mature-themed imprint, is being sunsetted. It's a kinder word than cancelled or killed, but still one that brings a tear to the eye. More surprisingly, however, DC Zoom (for middle grades) and DC Ink (a YA line) – two much heralded imprints for young readers – are also being phased out. The lines only launched this year and had already seen sales success. Despite this, I'm told that DC is still going full speed ahead with more material for younger readers [...]. The move to phase out the imprints is intended to make the overall DC brand more inclusive of a wide variety of material".

Both Comic Book Resources (CBR) and Vulture compared DC's previous female teen and young adult imprint Minx, which shuttered in 2008 shortly after launch, to its current young adult imprint. CBR wrote that "one of the biggest changes DC has made with DC Ink titles, as opposed to the direction of Minx, is base the current line around familiar DC superhero franchises. [...] The authors behind DC Ink, while typically being first-timers in comics, already have their own fanbases through pre-existing young adult novels. This gives them a built-in brand, while also allowing newcomers to bring their writing styles and world views into comics. The DC Ink books have also been accessible in everyday stores such as Wal-Mart, a benefit which most regular comic books do not have. On the other hand, the Minx titles struggled to be shelved in even dedicated bookstores, as sellers didn't know whether to place them amongst the comics or the YA section. The current superhero and comic book movie boom had also not quite begun when Minx titles were published".

S.W. Sondheimer, for Book Riot, highlighted the imprint name change and wrote: "A little less catchy, perhaps, but a better guide to the type of content you can expect to find in a given book [...]. Every one of the DC Graphic Novels for Young Readers and DC Graphic Novels for Young Adults has something different to offer their readers, but they're all built around forging connections, lending support to their audiences in their quests for self-realization and actualization, and most excellent hero stories. With tons more in the works, I hope these imprints, whatever their names happen to be, are around for a long time". Sondheimer also highlighted the specific themes the two imprint lines address and wrote: "Some of the protagonists are in-canon teenagers and some have been de-aged for their books, but they're all, for the purposes of this imprint, the same age as their readers, which allows those readers to forge connections with the protagonists and their stories more easily, and also helps kids self-insert to learn problem-solving skills. [...] All of the characters are heroes, yes, but they're all waging battles much more intimate and personal than defeating the Joker or the Witch Queen. They're fighting to understand themselves. [...] The other aspect of the DC Young/Young Adult Readers line I love is that, on a very basic level, each graphic novel is a family story. Almost every kind of family one can imagine has, or will, be represented".
