= Kody Keplinger =

American writer (born 1991)

- Born: August 8, 1991 (age 35); Owensboro, Kentucky
- Education: Ithaca College
- Occupation: Author
- Writing career
- Notable work: The DUFF
- Website: kodykeplinger.com

Kody Keplinger (born August 8, 1991, in Owensboro, Kentucky) is an American author of young adult and middle grade books. She is best known for her debut novel The DUFF, which she wrote when she was 17 years old. It was later turned into a movie of the same name.

In 2021, she wrote a graphic novel for DC antihero Poison Ivy.

== Personal life ==
Keplinger was born with Leber congenital amaurosis and is legally blind. She is a lesbian.

== Bibliography ==
=== Novels ===
- The DUFF, 2010
- Shut Out, 2011
- A Midsummer's Nightmare, 2012
- The Swift Boys & Me, 2014
- Lying Out Loud, 2015
- Run, 2016
- That's Not What Happened, 2020
- Lila and Hadley, 2020
- Where Lost Girls Go, 2026

=== Graphic novels ===
- Poison Ivy: Thorns, 2021 (illustrated by Sara Kipin)

=== Anthology Contributions ===
- Nijkamp, Marieke, ed. (September 18, 2018). "Britt and the Bike God". Unbroken: 13 Stories Starring Disabled Teens. Farrar, Straus and Giroux. ISBN 978-0-374-30650-2.
