= Eric Jones (comics) =

American comic book artist (1971–2022)

- Born: May 27, 1971 Walnut Creek, California
- Died: September 10, 2022 (aged 51) Oakland, California
- Area: Artist
- Notable works: Supergirl: Cosmic Adventures in the 8th Grade; Little Gloomy; Danger Club; Scary Larry

Eric Jones (May 27, 1971 – September 10, 2022) was an American comic book artist.

== Biography ==
Eric Jones was the artist and co-creator of a number of comic books and had worked for companies such as Disney, DC Comics, and Image Comics. Additionally, he was the co-creator of the internationally broadcast animated series Scary Larry, based on his series Little Gloomy.

== Bibliography ==
=== Comics ===
Comics work includes:

- Filthy Habits #1-5 (1994–1996, Aeon Comics)
- X-Ray Comics #1-3 (1997–1998, Slave Labor Graphics):
  - X-Ray Comics Volume 1: Filth (SLG Publishing, 2004, ISBN 0-943151-97-X)
  - X-Ray Comics Volume 2: Swine (SLG Publishing, 2004, ISBN 1-59362-004-7)
- Comic Zone 4: Kid Gravity (Disney Press, 2005, ISBN 978-0-7868-3765-6)
- Little Gloomy #1-6 (1999–2001, Slave Labor Graphics, tpb, Little Gloomy: It was a Dark and Stormy Night, SLG Publishing, 2002, ISBN 0-943151-64-3)
- The Super Scary Monster Show featuring Little Gloomy #1-3 (2005–2006, Slave Labor Graphics, tpb, 2008, ISBN 1-59362-103-5)
- Tron: The Ghost in the Machine #1-6 (2006–2008, Slave Labor Graphics, tpb, 2009, ISBN 1-59362-102-7)
- Supergirl: Cosmic Adventures in the Eighth Grade #1-6 (2008-2009 DC Comics, tpb, 2009, ISBN 1-4012-2506-3)
- Batman: The Brave and the Bold: The Fearsome Fangs Strike Again (DC Comics, tpb, 2011, ISBN 1-84856-995-5)
- Batman: The Brave and the Bold: Emerald Knight (DC Comics, tpb, 2012, ISBN 1-4012-3143-8)
- Danger Club Volume 1: Death (Image Comics, tpb, 2012 ISBN 1-60706-634-3)
- Danger Club Volume 2: Rebirth (Image Comics, tpb, 2015 ISBN 1-63215-367-X)
- The Infinite Adventures of Supernova Volume 1: Pepper Page Saves the Universe! (First Second Books, OGN, 2021 ISBN 1-250-21692-3)
