= List of UK Independent Albums Chart number ones of 2005 =

These are the Official Charts Company's UK Indie Chart number-one albums of 2005.

== Chart history ==
Issue date	Album	Artist(s)	Record label	Ref.
2 January	Hot Fuss	The Killers	Lizard King	
9 January	Hot Fuss	The Killers	Lizard King	
16 January	Hot Fuss	The Killers	Lizard King	
23 January	Hot Fuss	The Killers	Lizard King	
30 January	Hot Fuss	The Killers	Lizard King	
6 February	Hot Fuss	The Killers	Lizard King	
13 February	Hot Fuss	The Killers	Lizard King	
20 February	Silent Alarm	Bloc Party	Wichita	
27 February	Hot Fuss	The Killers	Lizard King	
6 March	Hot Fuss	The Killers	Lizard King	
13 March	Employment	Kaiser Chiefs	B-Unique	
20 March	Language. Sex. Violence. Other?	Stereophonics	V2	
27 March	The Singles	Basement Jaxx	XL	
3 April	The Singles	Basement Jaxx	XL	
10 April	The Singles	Basement Jaxx	XL	
17 April	The Singles	Basement Jaxx	XL	
24 April	The Singles	Basement Jaxx	XL	
1 May	The Singles	Basement Jaxx	XL	
8 May	Mighty ReArranger	Robert Plant & The Strange Sensation	Sanctuary	
15 May	The Singles	Basement Jaxx	XL	
22 May	A Certain Trigger	Maxïmo Park	Warp	
29 May	Employment	Kaiser Chiefs	B-Unique	
5 June	Employment	Kaiser Chiefs	B-Unique	
12 June	Get Behind Me Satan	The White Stripes	XL	
19 June	Get Behind Me Satan	The White Stripes	XL	
26 June	The Singles	Basement Jaxx	XL	
3 July	The Singles	Basement Jaxx	XL	
10 July	The Understanding	Röyksopp	Wall of Sound	
17 July	Hot Fuss	The Killers	Lizard King	
24 July	Hot Fuss	The Killers	Lizard King	
31 July	Hot Fuss	The Killers	Lizard King	
7 August	The Dangermen Sessions Vol. 1	Madness	V2	
14 August	Get Behind Me Satan	The White Stripes	XL	
21 August	Capture/Release	The Rakes	V2	
28 August	Howl	Black Rebel Motorcycle Club	XL	
11 September	I Am a Bird Now	Antony & The Johnsons	Secretly Canadian	
18 September	Leaders of the Free World	Elbow	V2	
25 September	I Am A Bird Now	Anthony & The Johnsons	Secretly Canadian	
2 October	Piece by Piece	Katie Melua	Dramatico	
9 October	You Could Have It So Much Better	Franz Ferdinand	Domino	
16 October	As Is Now	Paul Weller	Yep Roc	
23 October	Their Law: The Singles 1990–2005	The Prodigy	XL	
30 October	Their Law: The Singles 1990–2005	The Prodigy	XL	
6 November	Their Law: The Singles 1990–2005	The Prodigy	XL	
13 November	Their Law: The Singles 1990–2005	The Prodigy	XL	
20 November	Down In Albion	Babyshambles	Rough trade	
27 November	Their Law: The Singles 1990–2005	The Prodigy	XL	
4 December	Their Law: The Singles 1990–2005	The Prodigy	XL	
11 December	Piece By Piece	Katie Melua	Dramatico	
18 December	Piece By Piece	Katie Melua	Dramatico	
25 December	Piece By Piece	Katie Melua	Dramatico	

== See also ==
- List of number-one albums of 2005 (UK)
- List of UK Independent Singles Chart number ones of 2005
- List of UK Rock Chart number-one albums of 2005
- List of UK R&B Albums Chart number ones of 2005
