= List of UK R&B Singles Chart number ones of 2005 =

The UK R&B Chart is a weekly chart that ranks the 40 biggest-selling singles and albums that are classified in the R&B genre in the United Kingdom. The chart is compiled by the Official Charts Company, and is based on physical and other physical formats. This is a list of the UK's biggest R&B hits of 2005.

== Number ones ==
Key
†	Best-selling R&B single of the year

Issue date	Single	Artist
2 January	"You Can Do It"	Ice Cube featuring Mack 10 and Ms. Toi
9 January	"Numb/Encore"	Linkin Park and Jay-Z
16 January	"Numb/Encore"	Linkin Park and Jay-Z
23 January ^{[a]}	"Goodies"	Ciara featuring Petey Pablo
30 January	"Only U"	Ashanti
6 February ^{[a]}	"Like Toy Soldiers"	Eminem
13 February	"Like Toy Soldiers"	Eminem
20 February ^{[a]}	"Get Right"	Jennifer Lopez
27 February ^{[a]}	"Over and Over"	Nelly featuring Tim McGraw
6 March	"Over and Over"	Nelly featuring Tim McGraw
13 March	"Over and Over"	Nelly featuring Tim McGraw
20 March	"Rich Girl"	Gwen Stefani featuring Eve
27 March	"Let Me Love You"	Mario
3 April	"Let Me Love You"	Mario
10 April	"Let Me Love You"	Mario
17 April	"1, 2 Step"	Ciara featuring Missy Elliott
24 April	"1, 2 Step"	Ciara featuring Missy Elliott
1 May	"Signs"	Snoop Dogg featuring Charlie Wilson and Justin Timberlake
8 May ^{[a]}	"Lonely"	Akon
15 May ^{[a]}	"Lonely"	Akon
22 May	"Lonely"	Akon
29 May	"1 Thing"	Amerie
5 June	"1 Thing"	Amerie
12 June	"Feels Just Like It Should"	Jamiroquai
19 June	"Lonely"	Akon
26 June ^{[a]}	"Ghetto Gospel"	2Pac featuring Elton John
3 July ^{[a]}	"Ghetto Gospel"	2Pac featuring Elton John
10 July	"We Belong Together"	Mariah Carey
17 July	"Ghetto Gospel"	2Pac featuring Elton John
24 July	"Ghetto Gospel"	2Pac featuring Elton John
31 July	"Ghetto Gospel"	2Pac featuring Elton John
7 August	"Oh"	Ciara featuring Ludacris
14 August	"All the Way"	Craig David
21 August	"Belly Dancer (Bananza)"	Akon
28 August	"Don't Lie"	The Black Eyed Peas
4 September	"Don't Lie"	The Black Eyed Peas
11 September ^{[a]}	"Don't Cha" featuring Busta Rhymes †	The Pussycat Dolls
18 September ^{[a]}	"Don't Cha" featuring Busta Rhymes †	The Pussycat Dolls
25 September ^{[a]}	"Don't Cha" featuring Busta Rhymes †	The Pussycat Dolls
2 October	"Don't Cha" featuring Busta Rhymes †	The Pussycat Dolls
9 October	"Don't Cha" featuring Busta Rhymes †	The Pussycat Dolls
16 October	"Don't Cha" featuring Busta Rhymes †	The Pussycat Dolls
23 October	"Don't Cha" featuring Busta Rhymes †	The Pussycat Dolls
30 October	"Don't Cha" featuring Busta Rhymes †	The Pussycat Dolls
6 November	"Can I Have It Like That"	Pharrell Williams featuring Gwen Stefani
13 November	"Don't Love You No More (I'm Sorry)"	Craig David
20 November	"My Humps"	The Black Eyed Peas
27 November	"My Humps"	The Black Eyed Peas
4 December ^{[a]}	"Stickwitu"	The Pussycat Dolls
11 December ^{[a]}	"Stickwitu"	The Pussycat Dolls
18 December	"Stickwitu"	The Pussycat Dolls
25 December	"When I'm Gone"	Eminem

== Notes ==
- ^{a} - The single was simultaneously number one on the UK Singles Chart.

== See also ==
- List of UK Dance Singles Chart number ones of 2005
- List of UK Independent Singles Chart number ones of 2005
- List of UK Singles Downloads Chart number ones of the 2000s
- List of UK Rock & Metal Singles Chart number ones of 2005
- List of UK R&B Albums Chart number ones of 2005
