= List of British films of 2005 =

A list of British films released in 2005:

== 2005 ==
Title	Director	Cast	Genre	Notes
Asylum	David Mackenzie	Natasha Richardson, Marton Csokas, Ian McKellen	Drama	
Batman Begins	Christopher Nolan	Christian Bale, Michael Caine, Liam Neeson, Gary Oldman, Cillian Murphy, Tom Wilkinson, Rutger Hauer, Ken Watanabe, and Morgan Freeman	Superhero/action	Primarily shot in Iceland and Chicago
Beowulf & Grendel	Sturla Gunnarsson	Gerard Butler, Stellan Skarsgård	Drama	Filmed in Iceland
The Boy with a Thorn in His Side	Mark Jeavons	Alec Sedgley, Morgan Lees	Comedy	
Brothers of the Head	Keith Fulton, Louis Pepe	Harry Treadaway, Luke Treadaway	Mockumentary	
The Business	Nick Love	Danny Dyer, Tamer Hassan	Crime	
Charlie and the Chocolate Factory	Tim Burton	Johnny Depp, Freddie Highmore, David Kelly, Helena Bonham Carter, Noah Taylor, Missi Pyle, James Fox, Deep Roy, Christopher Lee	Musical fantasy	Co-production with the US
Chromophobia	Martha Fiennes	Penélope Cruz, Ralph Fiennes		Screened at the 2005 Cannes Film Festival
The Chronicles of Narnia: The Lion, the Witch and the Wardrobe	Andrew Adamson	William Moseley, Anna Popplewell, Skandar Keynes, Georgie Henley	Fantasy	
The Constant Gardener	Fernando Meirelles	Ralph Fiennes, Rachel Weisz, Hubert Koundé	Political thriller	Rachel Weisz won the Academy Award for Best Supporting Actress.
Conversations with Other Women	Hans Canosa	Aaron Eckhart, Helena Bonham Carter	Drama	
Corpse Bride	Mike Johnson, Tim Burton	Johnny Depp, Helena Bonham Carter	Animated musical dark fantasy	Co-production with the US
Creep	Christopher Smith	Franka Potente, Jeremy Sheffield, Vas Blackwood	Horror	
Derailed	Mikael Håfström	Clive Owen, Jennifer Aniston	Thriller	Co-production with the US
The Descent	Neil Marshall	Shauna MacDonald, Natalie Mendoza	Horror/adventure	
Dream's Ashes	Rafe Clayton	Alistair Marshall, Sam Jelf, Wayne (Danny) Thornton,	Drama	Filmed in Leeds
The Feast of the Goat	Luis Llosa	Tomas Milian, Isabella Rossellini	Drama	
Festival	Annie Griffin	Chris O'Dowd, Daniela Nardini, Stephen Mangan	Comedy	
Harry Potter and the Goblet of Fire	Mike Newell	Daniel Radcliffe, Rupert Grint, Emma Watson	Fantasy	
Heidi	Paul Marcus	Emma Bolger, Max von Sydow	Drama	
The Hitchhiker's Guide to the Galaxy	Garth Jennings	Martin Freeman, Mos Def	Sci-fi/comedy	
House of 9	Steven R. Monroe	Dennis Hopper, Kelly Brook	Horror	
In This World	Michael Winterbottom	Jamal Udin Torabi, Enayatullah	Docudrama	
Joyeux Noël	Christian Carion	Benno Furmann, Guillaume Canet, Gary Lewis	War drama	Co-produced with France & Germany
Keeping Mum	Niall Johnson	Rowan Atkinson, Kristin Scott Thomas	Comedy	
Kingdom of Heaven	Ridley Scott	Orlando Bloom, Eva Green, Jeremy Irons, David Thewlis, Brendan Gleeson, Marton Csokas, Liam Neeson	Epic historical drama	
Kinky Boots	Julian Jarrold	Joel Edgerton, Chiwetel Ejiofor	Drama/comedy	
Lassie	Charles Sturridge	Peter O'Toole, Samantha Morton	Family	
The League of Gentlemen's Apocalypse	Steve Bendelack	Mark Gatiss, Steve Pemberton, Reece Shearsmith	Comedy	
Love + hate	Dominic Savage	Samina Awan, Dean Andrews	Drama	
The Magic Roundabout	Various	Robbie Williams, Ray Winstone, Ian McKellen, Kylie Minogue	Animated	
Man to Man	Régis Wargnier	Joseph Fiennes, Kristin Scott Thomas	Drama	
Match Point	Woody Allen	Jonathan Rhys Meyers, Scarlett Johansson	Drama/thriller	
MirrorMask	Dave McKean	Stephanie Leonidas, Jason Barry, Rob Brydon, Gina McKee	Dark fantasy	Story by Neil Gaiman and Dave McKean
Mrs Henderson Presents	Stephen Frears	Judi Dench, Bob Hoskins	Comedy/drama	
Mrs. Palfrey at the Claremont	Dan Ireland	Joan Plowright, Rupert Friend	Comedy/drama	
Nanny McPhee	Kirk Jones	Emma Thompson, Colin Firth and Angela Lansbury	Comedy/family	
On a Clear Day	Gaby Dellal	Peter Mullan, Brenda Blethyn	Drama	
The Piano Tuner of Earthquakes	Stephen Quay, Timothy Quay	Amira Casar, Gottfried John, Assumpta Serna	Fantasy	
Pride & Prejudice	Joe Wright	Keira Knightley, Matthew Macfadyen, Brenda Blethyn	Literary drama	Adaptation of Jane Austen's novel
The Proposition	John Hillcoat	Ray Winstone, Guy Pearce	Action	Co-production with Australia
Revolver	Guy Ritchie	Jason Statham, Ray Liotta	Crime/drama	
The Russian Dolls	Cédric Klapisch	Romain Duris, Kelly Reilly, Audrey Tautou	Romantic comedy	Co-production with France; one win and two nominations
Separate Lies	Julian Fellowes	Tom Wilkinson, Emily Watson	Romance/drama	
Shooting Dogs	Michael Caton-Jones	John Hurt, Hugh Dancy	Drama	
Silence Becomes You	Stephanie Sinclaire	Alicia Silverstone, Sienna Guillory	Thriller	
Stoned	Stephen Woolley	Leo Gregory, Paddy Considine, David Morrissey	Biography	Depicts the life of Brian Jones of The Rolling Stones
Tickets	Abbas Kiarostami, Ken Loach, Ermanno Olmi	Martin Compston, Carlo Delle Piane, Aishe Gjuriqi	Comedy/drama	Co-production with Iran and Italy
Unleashed	Louis Leterrier	Jet Li	Martial arts/action/thriller	
V for Vendetta	James McTeigue	Natalie Portman, Hugo Weaving, Stephen Rea	Fantasy/thriller	
Valiant	Gary Chapman	Ewan McGregor, Ricky Gervais, Tim Curry	Animated/adventure	
Wah-Wah	Richard E. Grant	Nicholas Hoult, Miranda Richardson	Comedy/drama	
Wallace & Gromit: The Curse of the Were-Rabbit	Steve Box, Nick Park	Peter Sallis, Helena Bonham Carter, Ralph Fiennes	Animation	Academy Award for Best Animated Feature
The White Countess	James Ivory	Ralph Fiennes, Natasha Richardson	Drama	Co-production

== See also ==
- 2005 in film
- 2005 in British music
- 2005 in British radio
- 2005 in British television
- 2005 in the United Kingdom
- List of 2005 box office number-one films in the United Kingdom
