= 2005 in British music charts =

This is a summary of 2005 in music in the United Kingdom, including the official charts. Average sales for a number-one single were 80,437 per week.

Prominent music genres included girlgroup pop, with the success of Sugababes and Girls Aloud, as well as Rock, Indie Rock and Soul.

Elvis Presley broke the record for the most UK number-one singles. Arctic Monkeys helped a continued resurgence of Indie Rock music, as part of the post-punk revival scene scoring two UK No1 singles in 2005, including I Bet You Look Good on the Dancefloor.

== Summary ==
The first number one of the year, displacing Band Aid 20's "Do They Know It's Christmas?", was Steve Brookstein with his cover version of Phil Collins' "Against All Odds".

To celebrate the 70th anniversary of his birth, one of Elvis Presley's eighteen Number One singles were released each week from January until May. The first, "Jailhouse Rock", entered at Number One in early January. The second, "One Night", was the 1000th number-one single in the UK charts, and also set the record for being the lowest-selling weekly sale ever to reach the top spot. The run did not extend to a third week with "A Fool Such as I" only making number two, having been beaten by the debut release by Ciara. Elvis returned to the top spot in the fourth week, with "It's Now or Never".

The Scissor Sisters topped the album chart in the second week of 2005 having had a very successful 2004. Their eponymous album Scissor Sisters was released on 9 February 2004 and went on to sell 1,594,000 copies by the end of that year.

On 14 January pop band Busted announced that they were to split. The band had released two albums and topped the singles chart four times.

The Chemical Brothers topped the album and download charts with Push the Button and "Galvanize", respectively, with the single reaching the top ten. Keane returned to the top of the chart in the second week of February due to their success at the BRIT Awards, while on 6 February, Eminem got his sixth number one with "Like Toy Soldiers", making him the most successful rap artist in the UK singles chart.

On 6 March, Stereophonics earned their first number-one single with "Dakota", the first single to be taken from their new album, Language. Sex. Violence. Other?, which topped the album chart two weeks later.

The Comic Relief single of the year, the double A-side of "All About You" and "You've Got a Friend" by McFly, reached the top of the chart on 13 March. It was knocked off by a second Comic Relief single – a reissue of Tony Christie's "Is This the Way to Amarillo" with the associated video seeing comedian Peter Kay mime alongside various guest stars. Tony Christie topped the singles, album and download chart. The song spent seven weeks at the top of the singles charts, the longest stay at number 1 since Cher's "Believe" in 1998. On its original release in 1971, the song had charted no higher than No. 18.

On 29 May, Damon Albarn's Gorillaz topped the album charts with Demon Days. The following week, Gorillaz were knocked off the top by Albarn's former Britpop rivals Oasis who in turn were knocked off the top by Coldplay's eagerly awaited X&Y, which was met with mixed reviews itself. It was the second fastest album on first week sales only, behind Oasis' 1997 release, Be Here Now.

Headliners at the major festivals included: The Foo Fighters and Green Day at T in the Park; Faithless, Morrissey and R.E.M. at the Isle of Wight Festival; Feeder, Black Sabbath and System of a Down at the Download Festival; Scissor Sisters and Oasis at V Festival; Basement Jaxx and Faithless at Creamfields; New Order, Basement Jaxx, Keane and Kasabian at the Wireless Festival; Foo Fighters, Pixies and Iron Maiden at the Carling Weekend, while Glastonbury seen White Stripes, Coldplay and Basement Jaxx headline.

On 17 July 2005 James Blunt's single "You're Beautiful" went to number one six weeks after its release, having been in the top 15 for all the previous weeks. His album Back To Bedlam had hit the top spot the week previous. After five weeks at the top, he was then replaced by McFly, who scored their fourth chart topper with "I'll Be OK", the second release from their second album Wonderland which was to also top the album chart, making them the youngest band ever to have scored two UK number-one albums.

Oasis then followed up their May chart topper "Lyla" with a second, "The Importance of Being Idle", which would be their final number one before their break up in 2009. Gorillaz then scored their first (and to date only) number 1 when "Dare", featuring the vocals of Happy Mondays singer Shaun Ryder topped the chart for a week. Pussycat Dolls reached number 1 on 11 September with "Don't Cha", becoming the first American girl band to top the charts since Destiny's Child in 2001. Their next release, "Stickwitu", would also top the chart for two weeks in early December.

After a year's break, Sugababes returned to the top of the charts for the fourth time with the release of "Push the Button", and their fourth studio LP Taller in More Ways. These releases along with the album's second single "Ugly" would prove to be their last with Mutya Buena, who departed from the band that December to be replaced by Amelle Berrabah. The Arctic Monkeys entered the UK mainstream when their debut single, "I Bet You Look Good on the Dancefloor", went in at Number One on 23 October, beating the new single by Robbie Williams and knocking the Sugababes off the top.

Robbie Williams' new album Intensive Care set a new record when it topped the UK album chart on 30 October, with British acts occupying the number-one spot in the album chart for 25 consecutive weeks. The previous record, set in March 1990, was 24 weeks.

Kate Bush returned to the music world after a 12-year absence with the single "King of the Mountain", which became her biggest UK hit in 20 years by reaching No. 4, and was followed on 7 November by the acclaimed double album Aerial, which reached No. 3 and was certified platinum.

In the latter part of the year, the album chart was dominated by the usual range of 'greatest hits' packages, the most successful being Eminem's Curtain Call: The Hits, which topped the chart for four weeks in December and sold around nearly a million copies by early 2006. Mariah Carey also had success with her Greatest Hits album. Madonna also launched another successful comeback, spending three weeks at number one with her single "Hung Up". The coveted Christmas number one spot was taken by The X Factor winner Shayne Ward, who comfortably beat surprise contenders Nizlopi and the charity re-release of "Fairytale of New York". His single, "That's My Goal", became one of the quickest selling songs ever, with over 742,180 copies sold in just four days. Eminem continues to dominate in the albums chart with Curtain Call: The Hits reaching #1 for 5 weeks and selling around a million in the UK.

=== Chart calculation change ===
On 17 April, the first combined physical and downloaded singles sales chart was published, in an attempt by the record industry to boost flagging singles sales. It was suggested that this might make a significant impact on the demographics of chart as 96% of people downloading from the Internet at the time were male.

== Charts ==
=== Number-one singles ===
Chart date (week ending)	Song	Artist(s)	Sales
1 January	"Do They Know It's Christmas?"	Band Aid 20	231,929
8 January	"Against All Odds"	Steve Brookstein	26,400
15 January	"Jailhouse Rock"	Elvis Presley	21,262
22 January	"One Night/I Got Stung"	Elvis Presley	20,463
29 January	"Goodies"	Ciara featuring Petey Pablo	21,128
5 February	"It's Now or Never"	Elvis Presley	21,887
12 February	"Like Toy Soldiers"	Eminem	30,496
19 February	"Sometimes You Can't Make It on Your Own"	U2	30,359
26 February	"Get Right"	Jennifer Lopez	49,928
5 March	"Over and Over"	Nelly featuring Tim McGraw	41,528
12 March	"Dakota"	Stereophonics	40,378
19 March	"All About You/You've Got a Friend"	McFly	158,000
26 March	"(Is This the Way to) Amarillo"	Tony Christie featuring Peter Kay	266,844
2 April	"(Is This the Way to) Amarillo"	Tony Christie featuring Peter Kay	261,031
9 April	"(Is This the Way to) Amarillo"	Tony Christie featuring Peter Kay	130,700
16 April	"(Is This the Way to) Amarillo"	Tony Christie featuring Peter Kay	99,636
23 April	"(Is This the Way to) Amarillo"	Tony Christie featuring Peter Kay	69,000
30 April	"(Is This the Way to) Amarillo"	Tony Christie featuring Peter Kay	57,810
7 May	"(Is This the Way to) Amarillo"	Tony Christie featuring Peter Kay	47,945
14 May	"Lonely"	Akon	87,695
21 May	"Lonely"	Akon	59,772
28 May	"Lyla"	Oasis	75,124
4 June	"Axel F"	Crazy Frog	149,466
11 June	"Axel F"	Crazy Frog	120,246
18 June	"Axel F"	Crazy Frog	72,281
25 June	"Axel F"	Crazy Frog	52,084
2 July	"Ghetto Gospel"	2Pac featuring Elton John	56,016
9 July	"Ghetto Gospel"	2Pac featuring Elton John	54,820
16 July	"Ghetto Gospel"	2Pac featuring Elton John	39,627
23 July	"You're Beautiful"	James Blunt	38,951
30 July	"You're Beautiful"	James Blunt	46,443
6 August	"You're Beautiful"	James Blunt	51,671
13 August	"You're Beautiful"	James Blunt	44,875
20 August	"You're Beautiful"	James Blunt	35,671
27 August	"I'll Be OK"	McFly	45,814
3 September	"The Importance of Being Idle"	Oasis	47,235
10 September	"Dare"	Gorillaz featuring Shaun Ryder	26,661
17 September	"Don't Cha"	Pussycat Dolls featuring Busta Rhymes	85,021
24 September	"Don't Cha"	Pussycat Dolls featuring Busta Rhymes	65,120
1 October	"Don't Cha"	Pussycat Dolls featuring Busta Rhymes	44,897
8 October	"Push the Button"	Sugababes	78,282
15 October	"Push the Button"	Sugababes	64,489
22 October	"Push the Button"	Sugababes	46,783
29 October	"I Bet You Look Good on the Dancefloor"	Arctic Monkeys	38,962
5 November	"You Raise Me Up"	Westlife	97,288
12 November	"You Raise Me Up"	Westlife	58,175
19 November	"Hung Up"	Madonna	105,128
26 November	"Hung Up"	Madonna	59,969
3 December	"Hung Up"	Madonna	40,254
10 December	"Stickwitu"	Pussycat Dolls	43,989
17 December	"Stickwitu"	Pussycat Dolls	31,311
24 December	"JCB"	Nizlopi	81,660
31 December	"That's My Goal"	Shayne Ward	742,180

=== Number-one downloads ===
Chart date (week ending)	Song	Artist(s)
1 January	"Do They Know It's Christmas?"	Band Aid 20
8 January	"Vertigo"	U2
15 January	"What You Waiting For?"	Gwen Stefani
22 January	"What You Waiting For?"	Gwen Stefani
29 January	"Boulevard of Broken Dreams"	Green Day
5 February	"Galvanize"	The Chemical Brothers
12 February	"Galvanize"	The Chemical Brothers
19 February	"Galvanize"	The Chemical Brothers
26 February	"Galvanize"	The Chemical Brothers
5 March	"Dakota"	Stereophonics
12 March	"Dakota"	Stereophonics
19 March	"All About You/You've Got a Friend"	McFly
26 March	"All About You/You've Got a Friend"	McFly
2 April	"(Is This the Way to) Amarillo"	Tony Christie featuring Peter Kay
9 April	"(Is This the Way to) Amarillo"	Tony Christie featuring Peter Kay
16 April	"(Is This the Way to) Amarillo"	Tony Christie featuring Peter Kay
23 April	"(Is This the Way to) Amarillo"	Tony Christie featuring Peter Kay
30 April	"Speed of Sound"	Coldplay
7 May	"Speed of Sound"	Coldplay
14 May	"Speed of Sound"	Coldplay
21 May	"Don't Phunk with My Heart"	The Black Eyed Peas
28 May	"Don't Phunk with My Heart"	The Black Eyed Peas
4 June	"Feel Good Inc."	Gorillaz featuring De La Soul
11 June	"Feel Good Inc."	Gorillaz featuring De La Soul
18 June	"Feel Good Inc."	Gorillaz featuring De La Soul
25 June	"You're Beautiful"	James Blunt
2 July	"You're Beautiful"	James Blunt
9 July	"You're Beautiful"	James Blunt
16 July	"Sgt. Pepper's Lonely Hearts Club Band"	Paul McCartney & U2
23 July	"Electricity"	Elton John
30 July	"You're Beautiful"	James Blunt
6 August	"You're Beautiful"	James Blunt
13 August	"Bad Day"	Daniel Powter
20 August	"Bad Day"	Daniel Powter
27 August	"Bad Day"	Daniel Powter
3 September	"Bad Day"	Daniel Powter
10 September	"Bad Day"	Daniel Powter
17 September	"Don't Cha"	The Pussycat Dolls featuring Busta Rhymes
24 September	"Don't Cha"	The Pussycat Dolls featuring Busta Rhymes
1 October	"Don't Cha"	The Pussycat Dolls featuring Busta Rhymes
8 October	"Push the Button"	Sugababes
15 October	"Push the Button"	Sugababes
22 October	"Push the Button"	Sugababes
29 October	"Push the Button"	Sugababes
5 November	"Hung Up"	Madonna
12 November	"Hung Up"	Madonna
19 November	"Hung Up"	Madonna
26 November	"Hung Up"	Madonna
3 December	"Hung Up"	Madonna
10 December	"Hung Up"	Madonna
17 December	"Hung Up"	Madonna
24 December	"JCB Song"	Nizlopi
31 December	"That's My Goal"	Shayne Ward

=== Number-one albums ===
Chart date (week ending)	Album	Artist	Sales
1 January	Greatest Hits	Robbie Williams	
8 January	American Idiot	Green Day	43,263
15 January	Scissor Sisters	Scissor Sisters	38,174
22 January	Hot Fuss	The Killers	39,947
29 January	Hot Fuss	The Killers	49,433
5 February	Push the Button	The Chemical Brothers	58,364
12 February	Tourist	Athlete	83,370
19 February	Hopes and Fears	Keane	75,039
26 February	Scissor Sisters	Scissor Sisters	76,213
5 March	Some Cities	Doves	59,819
12 March	G4	G4	244,671
19 March	The Massacre	50 Cent	94,117
26 March	Language. Sex. Violence. Other?	Stereophonics	106,837
2 April	Definitive Collection	Tony Christie	82,686
9 April	Definitive Collection	Tony Christie	49,416
16 April	Counting Down the Days	Natalie Imbruglia	41,290
23 April	The Singles	Basement Jaxx	38,457
30 April	Trouble	Akon	39,954
7 May	Devils and Dust	Bruce Springsteen	62,311
14 May	Trouble	Akon	38,003
21 May	Heart and Soul	Steve Brookstein	50,989
28 May	Forever Faithless – The Greatest Hits	Faithless	70,282
4 June	Demon Days	Gorillaz	105,320
11 June	Don't Believe the Truth	Oasis	237,865
18 June	X&Y	Coldplay	464,471
25 June	X&Y	Coldplay	238,892
2 July	X&Y	Coldplay	100,198
9 July	X&Y	Coldplay	103,598
16 July	Back to Bedlam	James Blunt	97,694
23 July	Back to Bedlam	James Blunt	109,735
30 July	Back to Bedlam	James Blunt	110,932
6 August	Back to Bedlam	James Blunt	122,827
13 August	Back to Bedlam	James Blunt	100,813
20 August	Back to Bedlam	James Blunt	84,762
27 August	Back to Bedlam	James Blunt	70,000
3 September	Back to Bedlam	James Blunt	66,321
10 September	Wonderland	McFly	71,517
17 September	Back to Bedlam	James Blunt	43,477
24 September	Life in Slow Motion	David Gray	114,258
1 October	Life in Slow Motion	David Gray	71,599
8 October	Piece by Piece	Katie Melua	120,549
15 October	You Could Have It So Much Better	Franz Ferdinand	101,884
22 October	Taller in More Ways	Sugababes	65,781
29 October	Their Law: The Singles 1990–2005	The Prodigy	79,708
5 November	Intensive Care	Robbie Williams	373,832
12 November	Face to Face	Westlife	216,879
19 November	Ancora	Il Divo	149,047
26 November	Confessions on a Dancefloor	Madonna	217,610
3 December	Confessions on a Dancefloor	Madonna	110,527
10 December	Curtain Call: The Hits	Eminem	112,915
17 December	Curtain Call: The Hits	Eminem	241,382
24 December	Curtain Call: The Hits	Eminem	198,793
31 December	Curtain Call: The Hits	Eminem	314,553

=== Number-one compilation albums ===
Chart date (week ending)	Album
1 January	Now 59
8 January	Now 59
15 January	R&B Anthems 2005
2 April	Now 60
7 May	Happy Songs
14 May	Clubland X-Treme Hardcore
21 May	Happy Songs
28 May	Massive R&B
4 June	Massive R&B
11 June	Driving Rock Ballads
18 June	Dad Rocks
25 June	Dad Rocks
2 July	Hairbrush Divas Presents Sing-A-Long Summer
9 July	Clubland 7
16 July	Gatecrasher Classics
23 July	Gatecrasher Classics
30 July	Gatecrasher Classics
6 August	Now 61
13 August	Now 61
20 August	Now 61
27 August	Now 61
3 September	Now 61
15 October	Acoustic Love
22 October	Acoustic Love
29 October	Acoustic Love
5 November	Pop Party 3
12 November	Pop Party 3
19 November	Pop Party 3
26 November	Pop Party 3
3 December	Now 62
10 December	Now 62
17 December	Now 62
24 December	Now 62
31 December	Now 62

== Year-end charts ==
Between 2 January and 31 December 2005.

=== Best-selling singles ===
No.	Title	Artist	Peak position	Sales
1	"(Is This the Way to) Amarillo"	Tony Christie featuring Peter Kay	1	1,100,233
2	"That's My Goal"	Shayne Ward	1	874,444
3	"Axel F"	Crazy Frog	1	525,123
4	"You're Beautiful"	James Blunt	1	474,455
5	"Don't Cha"	Pussycat Dolls featuring Busta Rhymes	1	380,936
6	"All About You"/"You've Got a Friend"	McFly	1	338,553
7	"Lonely"	Akon	1	334,413
8	"Hung Up"	Madonna	1	327,504
9	"You Raise Me Up"	Westlife	1	323,466
10	"Push the Button"	Sugababes	1	306,695
11	"Bad Day"	Daniel Powter	2	
12	"JCB Song"	Nizlopi	1	
13	"Ghetto Gospel"	2Pac featuring Elton John	1	
14	"Feel Good Inc."	Gorillaz	2	
15	"Switch"	Will Smith	4	
16	"I Like the Way"	BodyRockers	3	
17	"I Bet You Look Good on the Dancefloor"	Arctic Monkeys	1	
18	"Let Me Love You"	Mario	2	
19	"Tripping"	Robbie Williams	2	
20	"We Belong Together"	Mariah Carey	2	
21	"Signs"	Snoop Dogg featuring Justin Timberlake & Charlie Wilson	2	
22	"Shot You Down"	Audio Bullys featuring Nancy Sinatra	3	
23	"Get Right"	Jennifer Lopez	1	
24	"Don't Phunk with My Heart"	The Black Eyed Peas	3	
25	"Over and Over"	Nelly featuring Tim McGraw	1	
26	"Dare"	Gorillaz featuring Shaun Ryder	1	
27	"We Be Burnin'"	Sean Paul	2	
28	"Stickwitu"	Pussycat Dolls	1	
29	"Candy Shop"	50 Cent featuring Olivia	4	
30	"Since U Been Gone"	Kelly Clarkson	5	
31	"Lyla"	Oasis	1	
32	"My Humps"	The Black Eyed Peas	3	
33	"Pon de Replay"	Rihanna	2	
34	"Crazy Chick"	Charlotte Church	2	
35	"Gold Digger"	Kanye West featuring Jamie Foxx	2	
36	"Roc Ya Body (Mic Check 1 2)"	MVP	5	
37	"The Importance of Being Idle"	Oasis	1	
38	"1 Thing"	Amerie	4	
39	"Doctor Pressure"	Mylo vs Miami Sound Machine	3	
40	"Dakota"	Stereophonics	1	
41	"Speed of Sound"	Coldplay	2	
42	"Somewhere Else"	Razorlight	2	
43	"No Worries"	Simon Webbe	4	
44	"1, 2 Step"	Ciara featuring Missy Elliott	3	
45	"Like Toy Soldiers"	Eminem	1	
46	"Falling Stars"	Sunset Strippers	3	
47	"Hollaback Girl"	Gwen Stefani	8	
48	"Rich Girl"	Gwen Stefani featuring Eve	4	
49	"Hate It or Love It"	The Game featuring 50 Cent	4	
50	"Lay Your Hands"	Simon Webbe	4	

=== Best-selling singles downloads ===
No.	Title	Artist
1	"You're Beautiful"	James Blunt
2	"Hung Up"	Madonna
3	"Bad Day"	Daniel Powter
4	"Push the Button"	Sugababes
5	"Feel Good Inc"	Gorillaz
6	"Don't Cha"	Pussycat Dolls featuring Busta Rhymes
7	"That's My Goal"	Shayne Ward
8	"Is This the Way to Amarillo"	Tony Christie featuring Peter Kay
9	"Gold Digger"	Kanye West featuring Jamie Foxx
10	"I Like the Way"	BodyRockers

=== Best-selling albums ===
No.	Title	Artist	Peak position	Sales
1	Back to Bedlam	James Blunt	1	2,367,758
2	X&Y	Coldplay	1	1,999,260
3	Intensive Care	Robbie Williams	1	1,434,315
4	Employment	Kaiser Chiefs	3 (Note: Reached number 2 in 2006)	1,312,122
5	Demon Days	Gorillaz	1	1,198,202
6	Face to Face	Westlife	1	1,142,563
7	Eye to the Telescope	KT Tunstall	3	1,023,650
8	Breakaway	Kelly Clarkson	3	952,225
9	Curtain Call: The Hits	Eminem	1	926,012
10	Forever Faithless – The Greatest Hits	Faithless	1	912,887
11	Piece by Piece	Katie Melua	1	
12	Hot Fuss	The Killers	1	
13	Don't Believe the Truth	Oasis	1	
14	Ancora	Il Divo	1	
15	Confessions on a Dancefloor	Madonna	1	
16	American Idiot	Green Day	1	
17	Scissor Sisters	Scissor Sisters	1	
18	Hopes and Fears	Keane	1	
19	Never Forget – The Ultimate Collection	Take That	2	
20	Love. Angel. Music. Baby.	Gwen Stefani	4	
21	Monkey Business	The Black Eyed Peas	4	
22	Taller in More Ways	Sugababes	1	
23	Life in Slow Motion	David Gray	1	
24	The Singles	Basement Jaxx	1	
25	PCD	Pussycat Dolls	8	
26	G4	G4	1	
27	In Your Honour	Foo Fighters	2	
28	Definitive Collection	Tony Christie	1	
29	The Massacre	50 Cent	1	
30	In Between Dreams	Jack Johnson	10 (Note: Reached number 1 in 2006)	
31	The Emancipation of Mimi	Mariah Carey	7	
32	Tourist	Athlete	1	
33	Trouble	Akon	1	
34	Keep On	Will Young	2	
35	Their Law: The Singles 1990–2005	The Prodigy	1	
36	Ultimate Collection	Eurythmics	5	
37	Language. Sex. Violence. Other?	Stereophonics	1	
38	Jeff Wayne's Musical Version of The War of the Worlds	Jeff Wayne	5	
39	The Magic Numbers	The Magic Numbers	7	
40	Greatest Hits	Mariah Carey	7	
41	Retrospectacle – The Supertramp Anthology	Supertramp	9	
42	It's Time	Michael Bublé	4	
43	Late Registration	Kanye West	2	
44	Kasabian	Kasabian	4	
45	Franz Ferdinand	Franz Ferdinand	5 (Note: Reached number 3 in 2004)	
46	Guilty Too	Barbra Streisand	3	
47	Living a Dream	Katherine Jenkins	4	
48	Il Divo	Il Divo	2 (Note: Reached number 1 in 2004)	
49	Mind Body & Soul	Joss Stone	9 (Note: Reached number 1 in 2004)	
50	You Could Have It So Much Better	Franz Ferdinand	1	

=== Best-selling compilation albums ===
No.	Title	Peak position
1	Now 62	1
2	Now 61	1
3	Now 60	1
4	Pop Party 3	1
5	Dance Party	1
6	Pop Jr	2
7	Happy Songs	1
8	The Annual 2006	2
9	Housework Songs	3
10	Gatecrasher Classics	1

== See also ==
- List of UK Dance Singles Chart number ones of 2005
- List of UK Independent Singles Chart number ones of 2005
- List of UK Rock & Metal Singles Chart number ones of 2005
