= Leetham =

Leetham is a surname. Notable people with the surname include:

- Chris Leetham (fl. 2000), Australian ice hockey goaltender who played in 2000 IIHF Asian Oceanic Junior U18 Championship
- Grant Leetham, character in the British TV series Utopia
- Rob Leetham (fl. 2005), actor in The Boy with a Thorn in His Side
