= List of UK Rock & Metal Albums Chart number ones of 2005 =

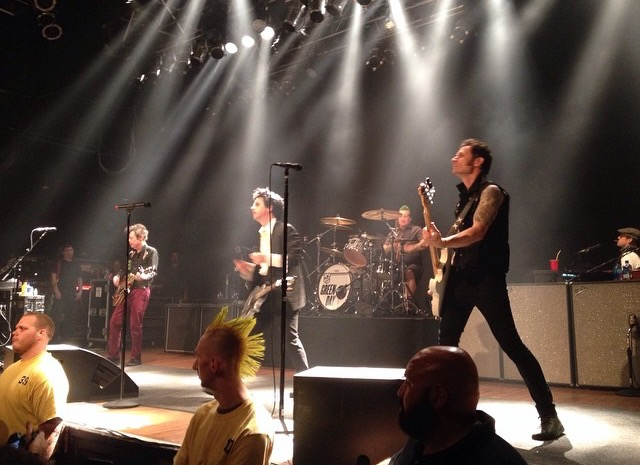
Green Day's 2004 seventh studio album American Idiot was the longest-running number-one album of 2005, spending 16 weeks atop the chart.

The UK Rock & Metal Albums Chart is a record chart which ranks the best-selling rock and heavy metal albums in the United Kingdom. Compiled and published by the Official Charts Company, the data is based on each album's weekly physical sales, digital downloads and streams. In 2005, there were 19 albums that topped the 52 published charts. The first number-one album of the year was American Idiot, the seventh studio album by Green Day, which was released the previous year and spent 18 consecutive weeks at number one from 30 October 2004. The first new number-one album of the year was The Mars Volta's second studio album Frances the Mute. The final number-one album of the year was Green Day's first full-length live album Bullet in a Bible, which spent the last three weeks of the year at number one.

The most successful album on the UK Rock & Metal Albums Chart in 2005 was American Idiot, which spent a total of 16 weeks at number one over five separate spells, including one of nine consecutive weeks. In Your Honor, the fifth studio album by Foo Fighters, was number one for eight weeks in 2005, while Don't Believe the Truth by Oasis spent six weeks at number one and was the best-selling rock and metal album of the year, ranking 13th in the UK End of Year Albums Chart. Bullet in a Bible by Green Day spent four weeks at number one in 2005, Queens of the Stone Age's fourth studio album Lullabies to Paralyze spent three weeks at number one, and two albums – the Roadrunner United collaboration album The All-Star Sessions and Blink-182's Greatest Hits compilation – each spent two weeks at number one in 2005.

== Chart history ==
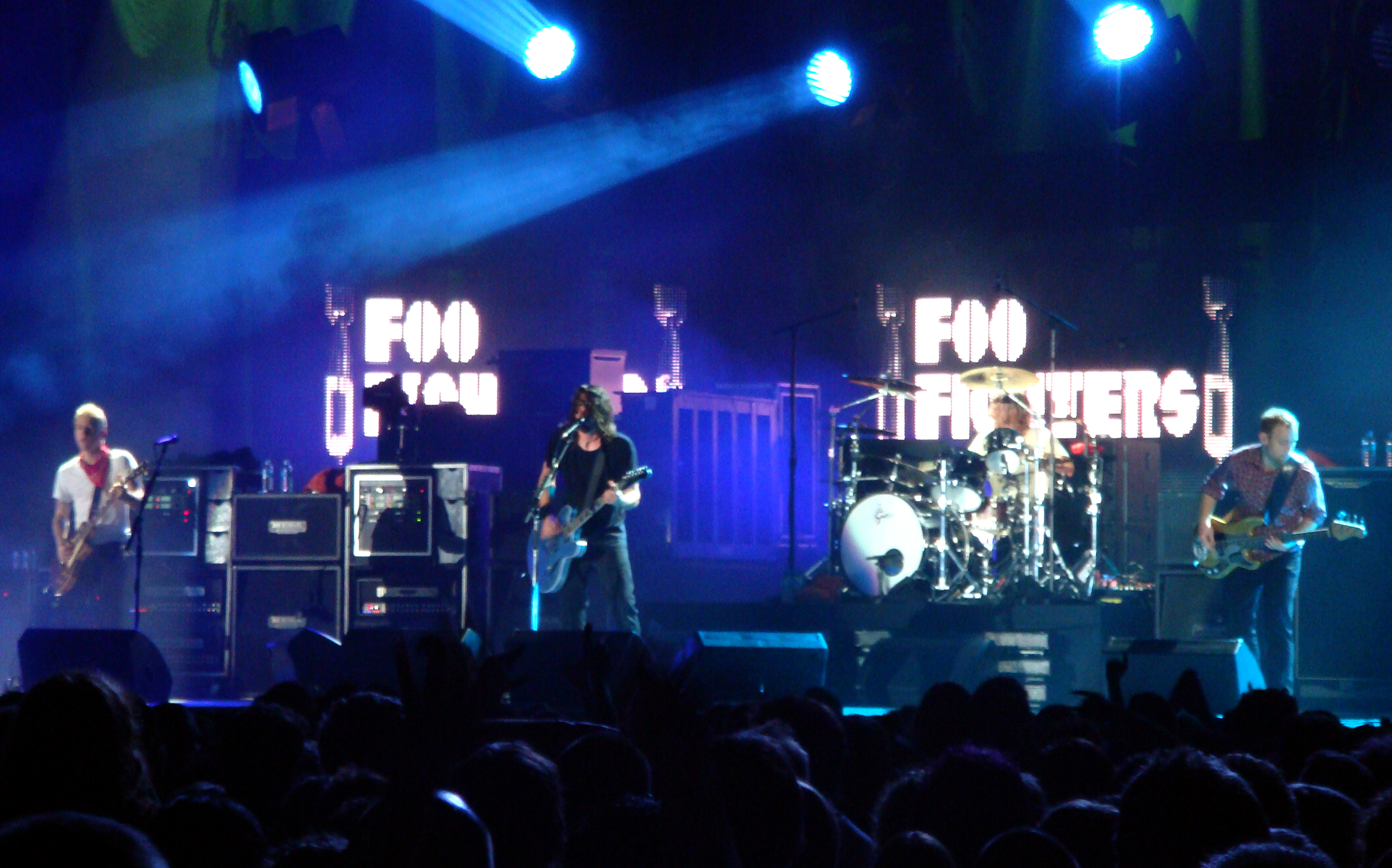
Foo Fighters spent eight weeks at number one in 2005 with their fifth studio album In Your Honor.

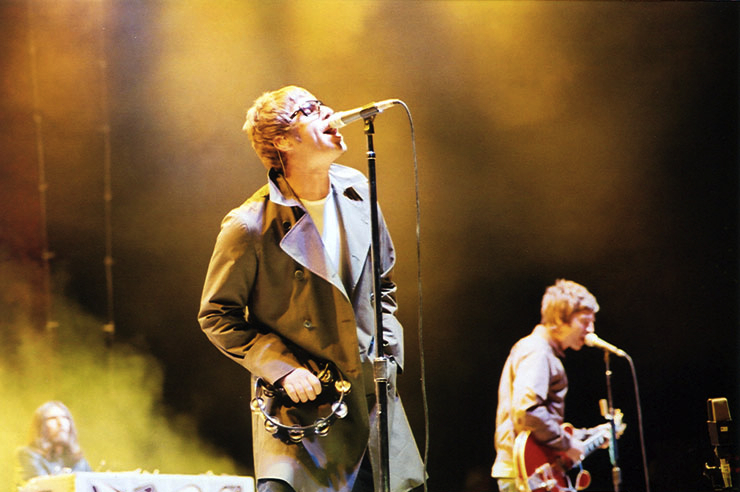
Don't Believe the Truth by Oasis spent six weeks at number one and was the best-selling rock and metal album of 2005 in the UK, ranking 13th overall.

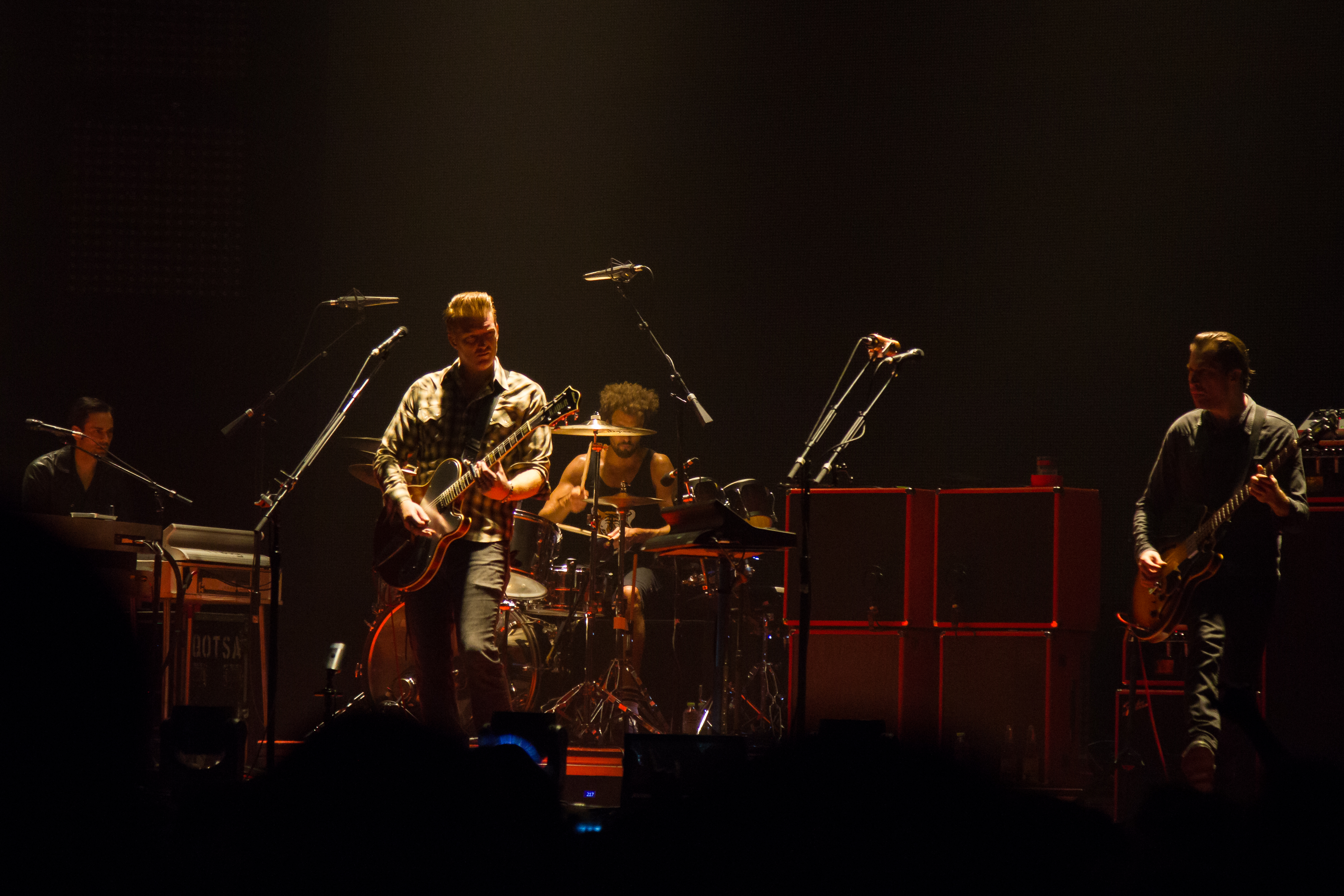
Queens of the Stone Age's fourth studio album Lullabies to Paralyze was number one for three weeks in 2005.

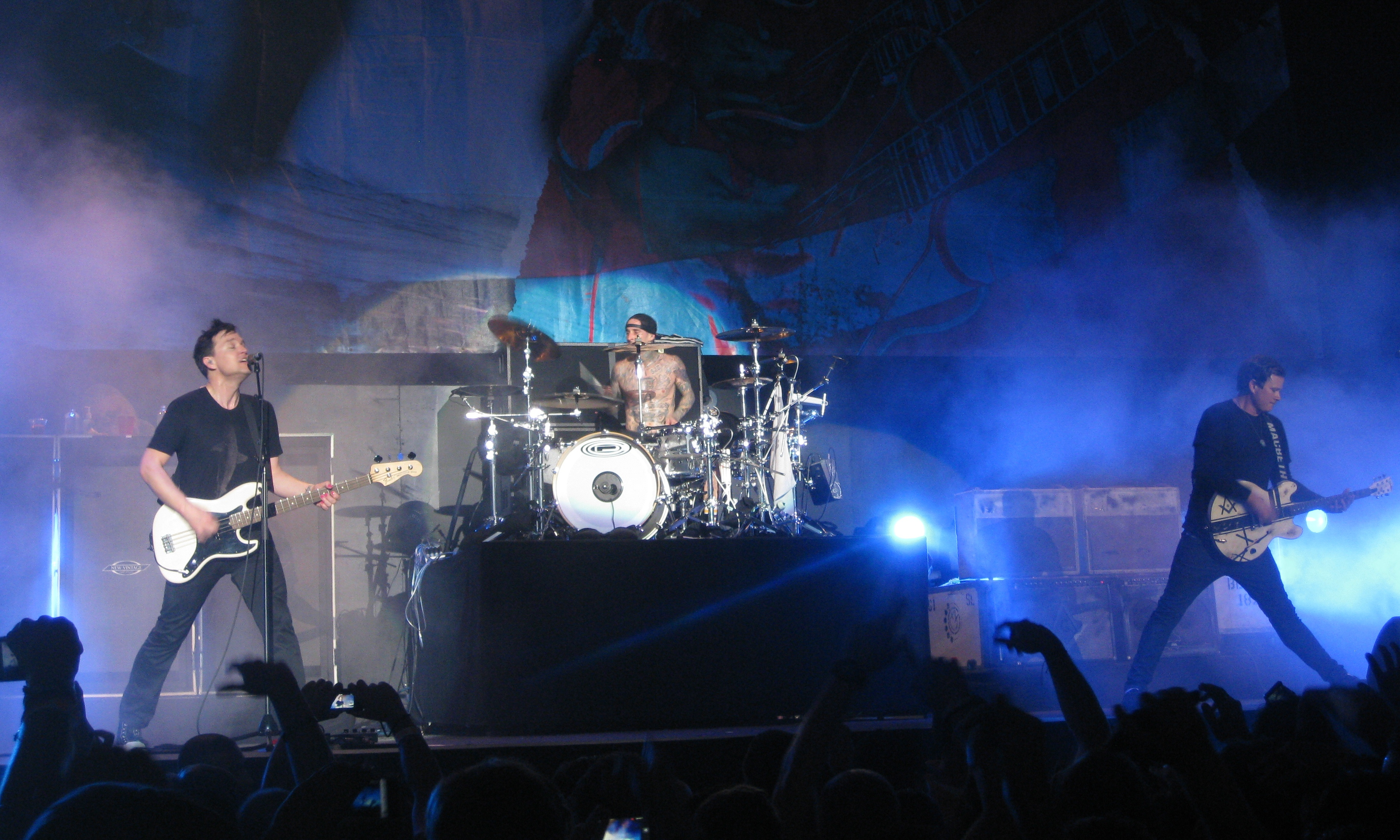
Blink-182's Greatest Hits compilation spent two weeks at number one.

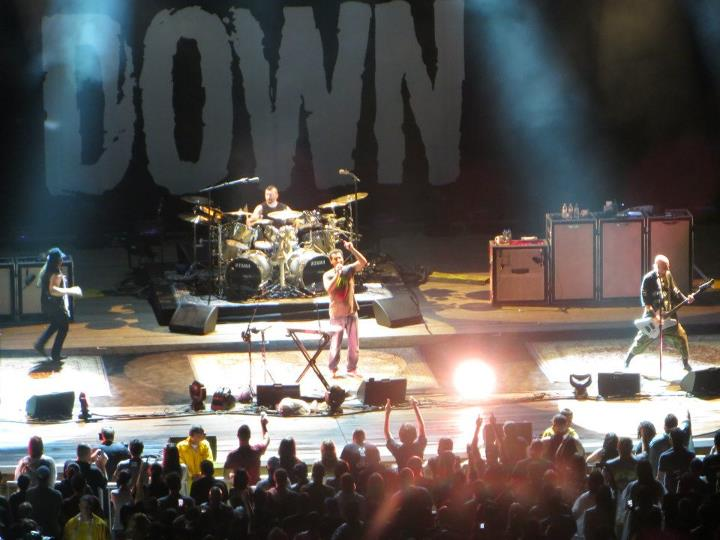
System of a Down released two albums in 2005 which topped the UK Rock & Metal Albums Chart for a week each – Mezmerize and Hypnotize.

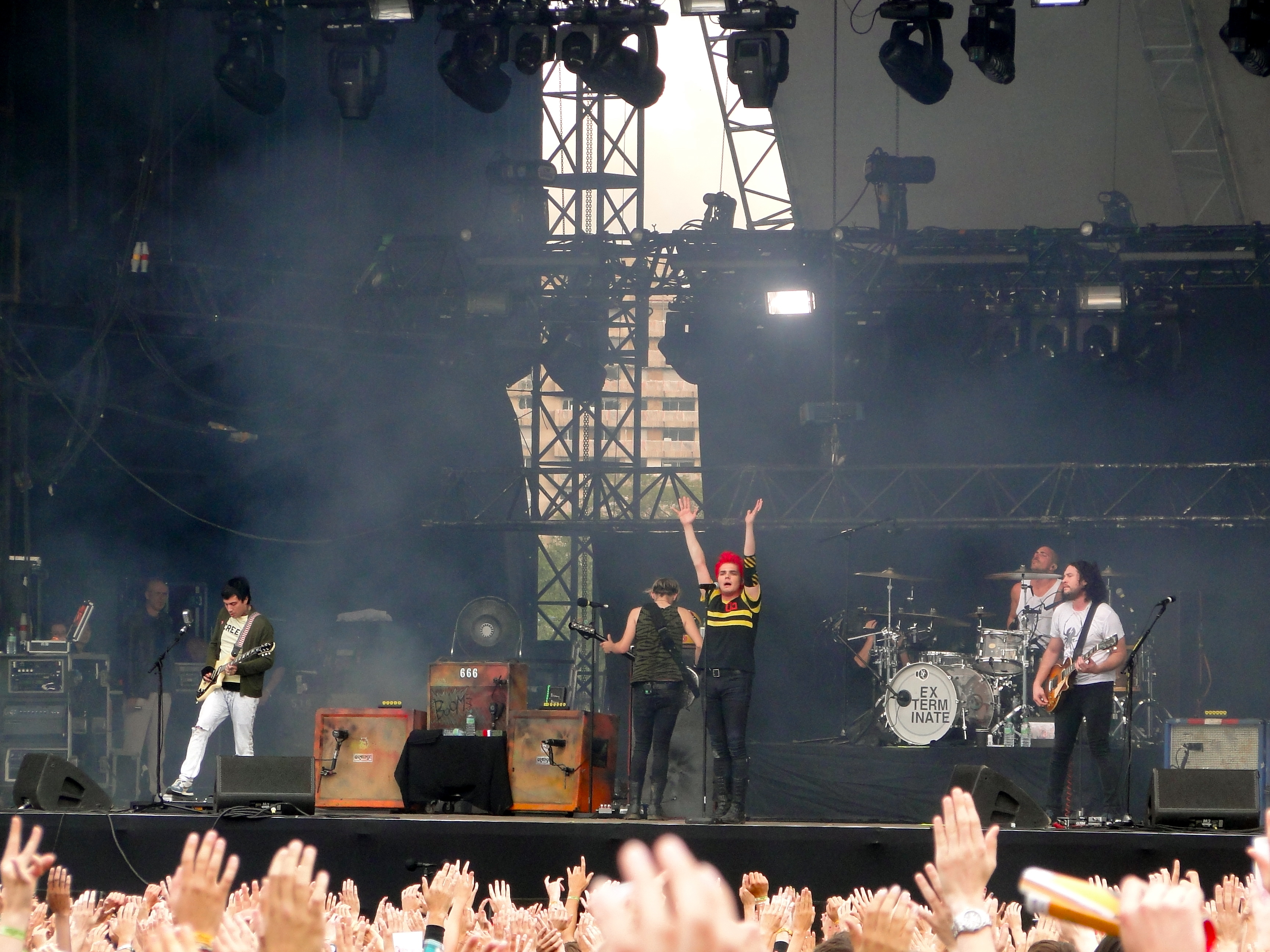
My Chemical Romance's second studio album Three Cheers for Sweet Revenge was the band's first number one on the UK Rock & Metal Albums Chart.

Key
†	Indicates best-selling rock album of 2005

Issue date	Album	Artist(s)	Record label(s)	Ref.
1 January	American Idiot	Green Day	Reprise	
8 January	American Idiot	Green Day	Reprise	
15 January	American Idiot	Green Day	Reprise	
22 January	American Idiot	Green Day	Reprise	
29 January	American Idiot	Green Day	Reprise	
5 February	American Idiot	Green Day	Reprise	
12 February	American Idiot	Green Day	Reprise	
19 February	American Idiot	Green Day	Reprise	
26 February	American Idiot	Green Day	Reprise	
5 March	Frances the Mute	The Mars Volta	Universal	
12 March	American Idiot	Green Day	Reprise	
19 March	American Idiot	Green Day	Reprise	
26 March	American Idiot	Green Day	Reprise	
2 April	Lullabies to Paralyze	Queens of the Stone Age	Interscope	
9 April	Lullabies to Paralyze	Queens of the Stone Age	Interscope	
16 April	Lullabies to Paralyze	Queens of the Stone Age	Interscope	
23 April	Three Cheers for Sweet Revenge	My Chemical Romance	Reprise	
30 April	Nevermind	Nirvana	Geffen	
7 May	American Idiot	Green Day	Reprise	
14 May	With Teeth	Nine Inch Nails	Island	
21 May	Make Believe	Weezer	Geffen	
28 May	Mezmerize	System of a Down	American/Columbia	
4 June	Out of Exile	Audioslave	Epic/Interscope	
11 June	Don't Believe the Truth †	Oasis	Big Brother	
18 June	Don't Believe the Truth †	Oasis	Big Brother	
25 June	In Your Honor	Foo Fighters	RCA	
2 July	In Your Honor	Foo Fighters	RCA	
9 July	In Your Honor	Foo Fighters	RCA	
16 July	In Your Honor	Foo Fighters	RCA	
23 July	In Your Honor	Foo Fighters	RCA	
30 July	American Idiot	Green Day	Reprise	
6 August	American Idiot	Green Day	Reprise	
13 August	Don't Believe the Truth †	Oasis	Big Brother	
20 August	Don't Believe the Truth †	Oasis	Big Brother	
27 August	Don't Believe the Truth †	Oasis	Big Brother	
3 September	Don't Believe the Truth †	Oasis	Big Brother	
10 September	Dance of Death	Iron Maiden	EMI	
17 September	In Your Honor	Foo Fighters	RCA	
24 September	In Your Honor	Foo Fighters	RCA	
1 October	In Your Honor	Foo Fighters	RCA	
8 October	Dark Light	HIM	Wea	
15 October	The Poison	Bullet for My Valentine	Visible Noise	
22 October	The All-Star Sessions	Roadrunner United	Roadrunner	
29 October	The All-Star Sessions	Roadrunner United	Roadrunner	
5 November	American Idiot	Green Day	Reprise	
12 November	Greatest Hits	Blink-182	Geffen	
19 November	Greatest Hits	Blink-182	Geffen	
26 November	Bullet in a Bible	Green Day	Reprise	
3 December	Hypnotize	System of a Down	American/Columbia	
10 December	One Way Ticket to Hell... and Back	The Darkness	Atlantic	
17 December	Bullet in a Bible	Green Day	Reprise	
24 December	Bullet in a Bible	Green Day	Reprise	
31 December	Bullet in a Bible	Green Day	Reprise	

== See also ==
- 2005 in British music
- List of UK Rock & Metal Singles Chart number ones of 2005
