= List of UK Dance Singles Chart number ones of 2005 =

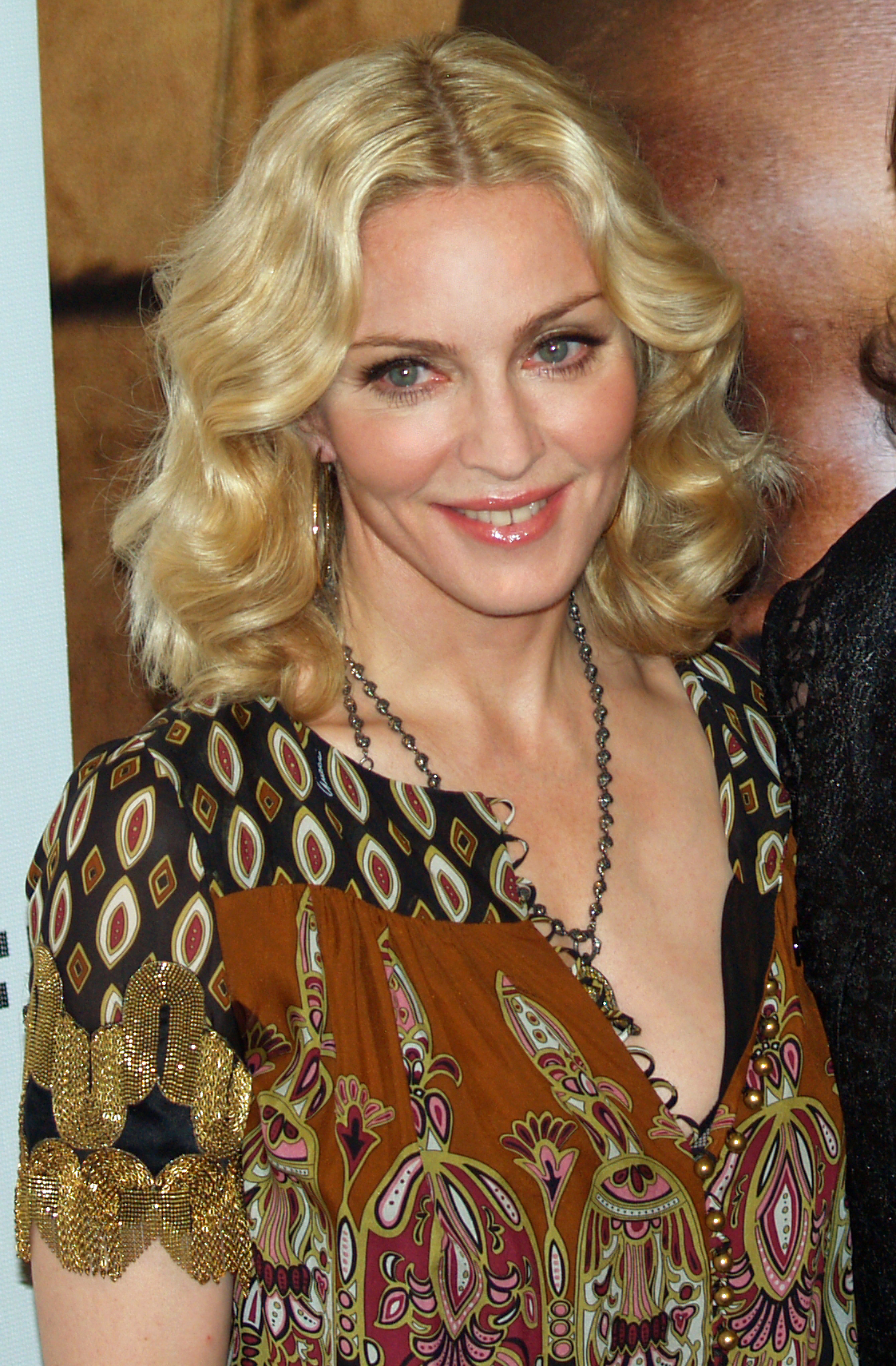
Madonna had the biggest-selling dance hit of 2005 with her single "Hung Up".

The UK Dance Chart is a weekly chart that ranks the biggest-selling dance singles in the United Kingdom, and is compiled by the Official Charts Company. The dates listed in the menus below represent the Saturday after the Sunday the chart was announced, as per the way the dates are given in chart publications such as the ones produced by Billboard, Guinness, and Virgin. In 2005, the chart was based on sales of CD singles and 12-inch singles, and was published in the UK magazines ChartsPlus and Music Week and on BBC Radio 1's official website. During the year, 37 singles reached number one.

The biggest-selling dance hit of 2005 was "Hung Up" by Madonna—it sold nearly 328,000 copies in the UK and topped the UK Singles Chart. "Hung Up" was also the longest-running number one of year, spending four weeks at the top; it was the longest running number one since "Lola's Theme" by Shapeshifters had spent five weeks at number one the previous year. Other high-selling dance singles included "I Like the Way" by Bodyrockers, which sold over 188,000 copies, and "Shot You Down" by Audio Bullys featuring Nancy Sinatra, which sold nearly 161,000 singles. Both "I Like the Way" and "Shot You Down" reached Number 3 on the UK Singles Chart. Four acts topped the chart with more than one single. They were: Daft Punk, Pendulum, Basement Jaxx and The Prodigy. The only act to top the chart with more than two singles was Mylo, who reached number one with "Destroy Rock & Roll", "In My Arms" and "Doctor Pressure".

Chart-topping singles from the 2005 UK Dance Chart also included "Do Your Thing" by Basement Jaxx, which reached number one after being used in an advert for British television network ITV. The Prodigy topped the chart with a rerelease of their previous singles "Voodoo People" and "Out of Space", which were remixed by fellow chart-toppers Pendulum and Audio Bullys.

== Chart history ==
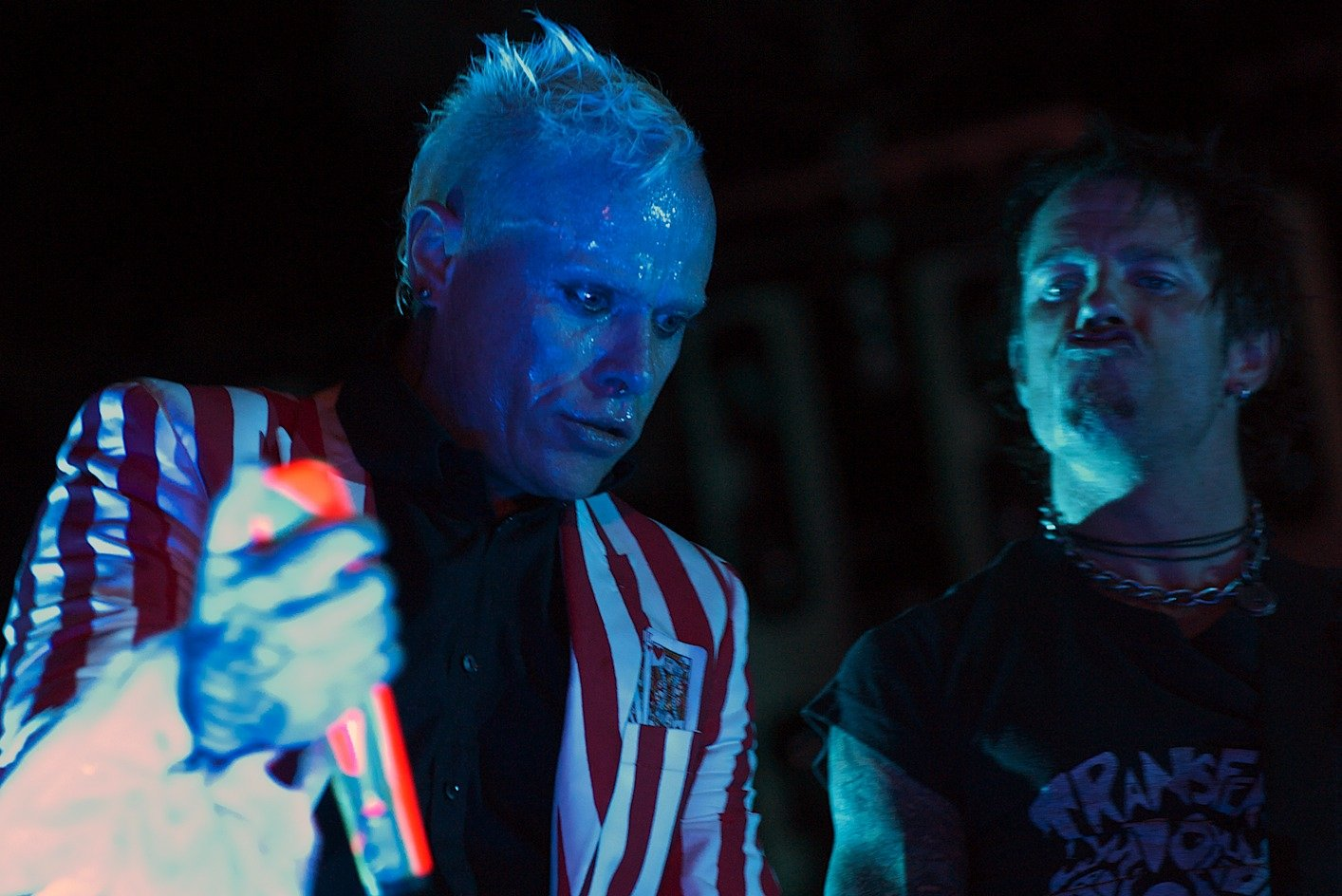
The Prodigy reached number one with remixes of their previous singles "Voodoo People" and "Out of Space", as well a new track, "Spitfire".

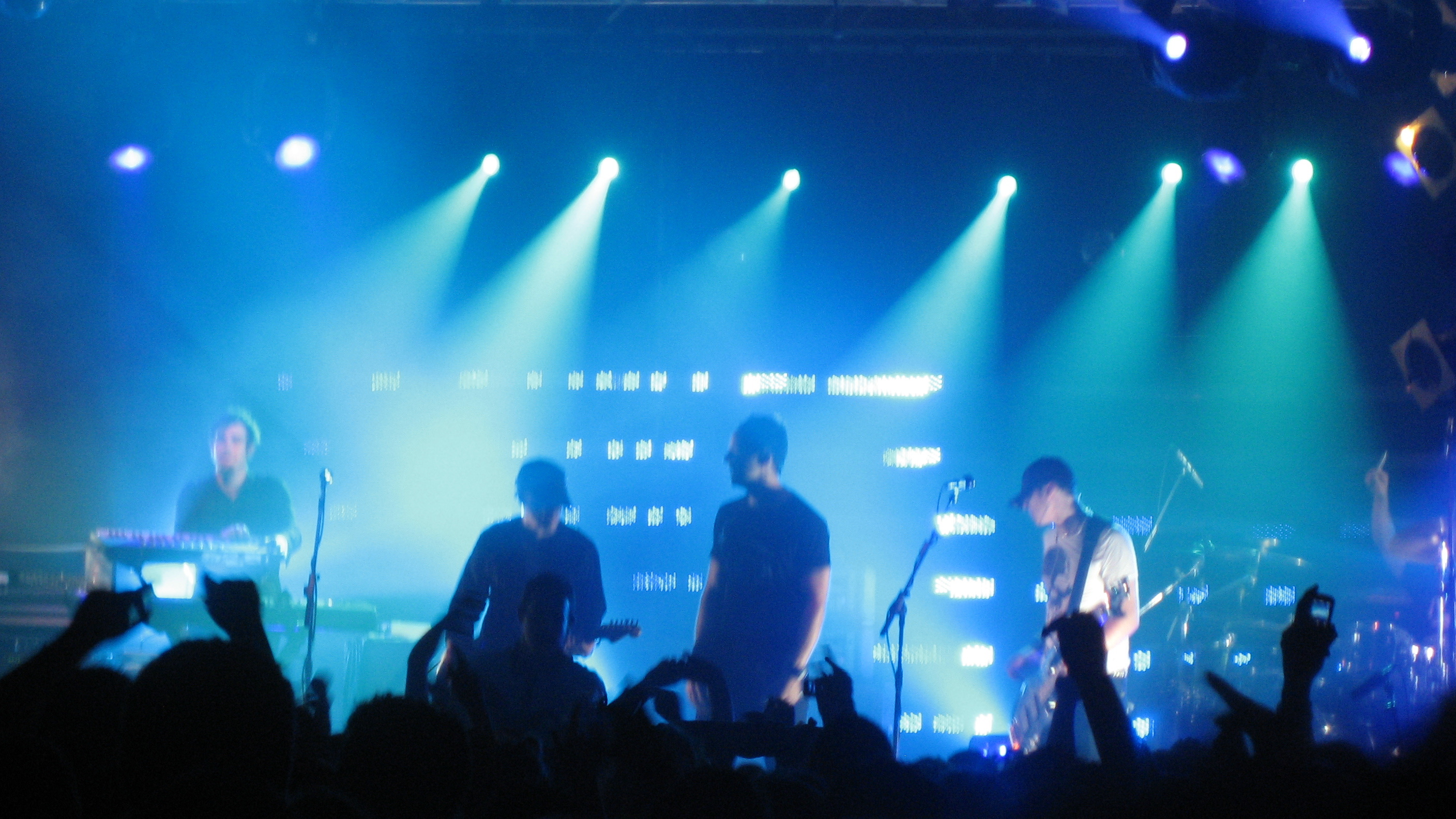
Pendulum were one of five acts to top the UK Dance Chart with more than one single.

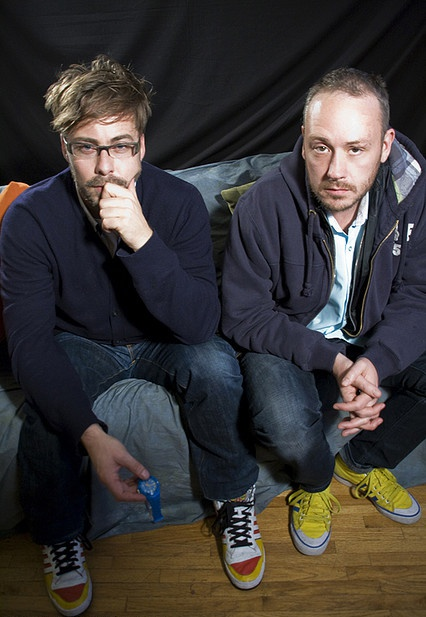
Basement Jaxx topped the chart after their song "Do Your Thing" was used in a television advert.

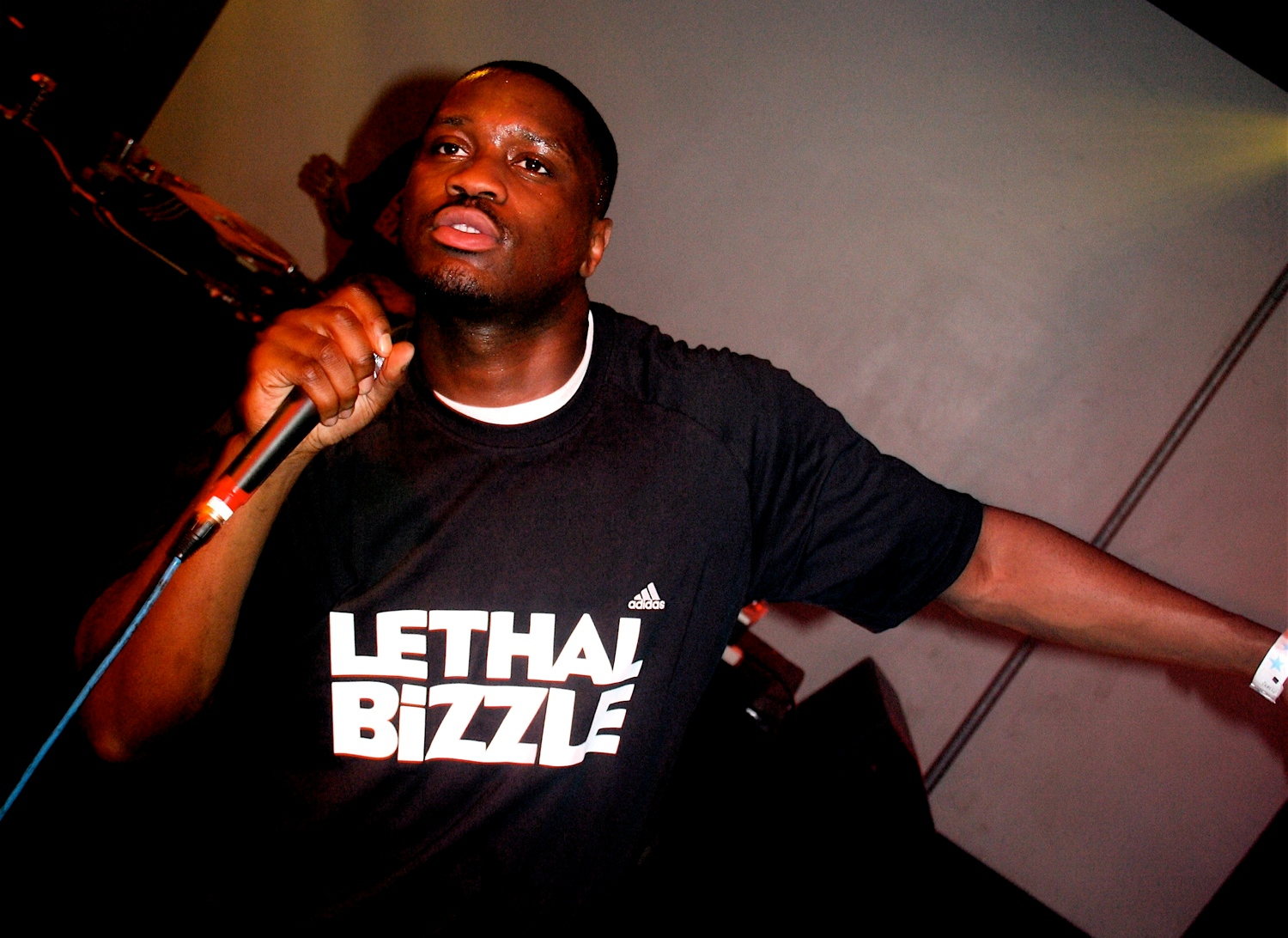
British rapper Lethal Bizzle had the first dance number one of the year with "Pow! (Forward)".

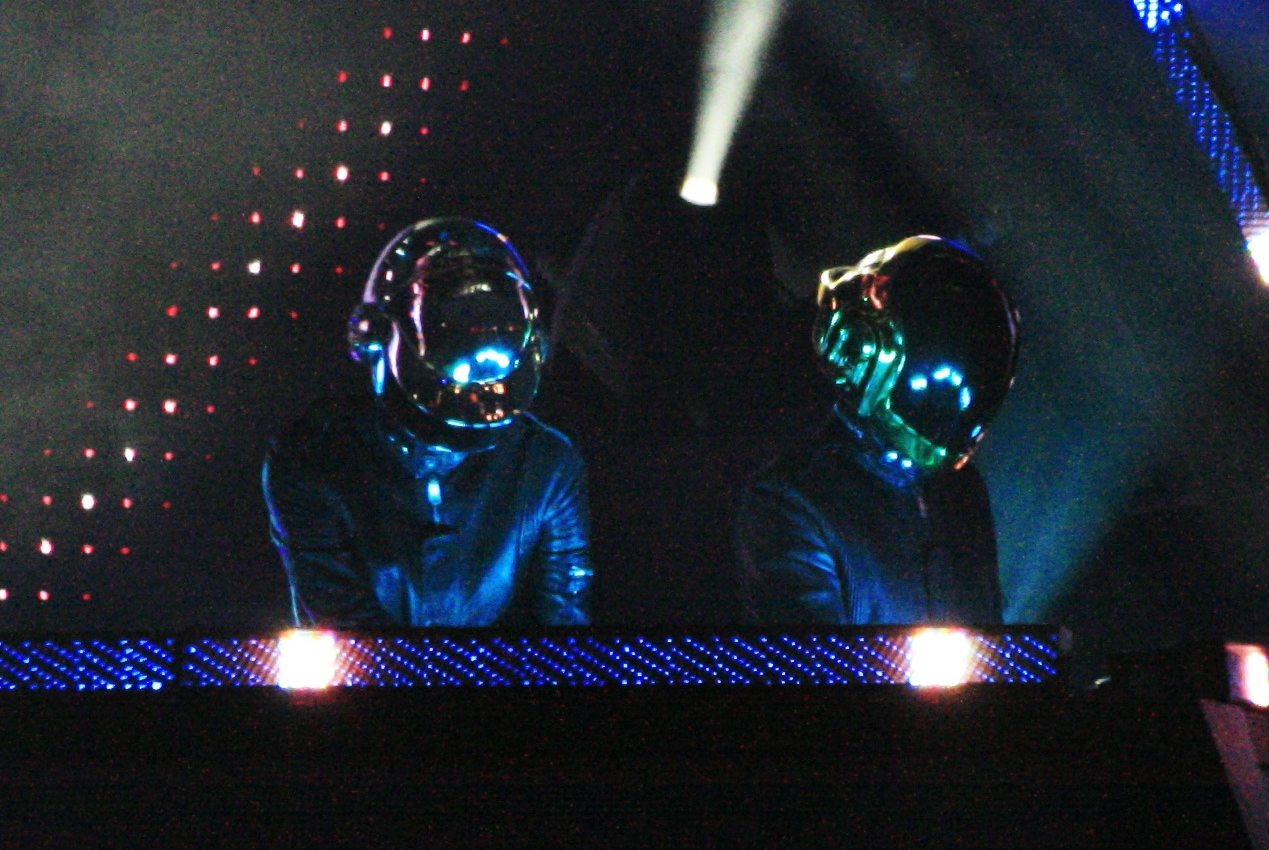
Daft Punk topped the UK Dance Chart with two singles in 2005.

Issue date	Song	Artist(s)	Record label	Ref.
1 January	"Pow! (Forward)"	Lethal Bizzle	Relentless	
8 January	"Pow! (Forward)"	Lethal Bizzle	Relentless	
15 January	"Filthy/Gorgeous"	Scissor Sisters	Polydor	
22 January	"String Of Life (Stronger On My Own)"	Soul Central featuring Kathy Brown	Defected	
29 January	"Galvanize"	The Chemical Brothers	Virgin	
5 February	"Destroy Rock & Roll"	Mylo	Breastfed	
12 February	"Destroy Rock & Roll"	Mylo	Breastfed	
19 February	"Galvanize"	The Chemical Brothers	Virgin	
26 February	"Galvanize"	The Chemical Brothers	Virgin	
5 March	"Need to Feel Loved"	Reflekt featuring Delline Bass	Positiva	
12 March	"Daft Punk Is Playing at My House"	LCD Soundsystem	DFA/EMI	
19 March	"X Ray" / "Scarecrow"	Sub Focus	Ram	
26 March	"Oh My Gosh"	Basement Jaxx	XL	
2 April	"Give Me Your Love"	XTM & DJ Chucky presents Annia	Wonderboy	
9 April	"I See Girls"	Studio B	Data	
16 April	"Spitfire"	The Prodigy	XL	
23 April	"Robot Rock"	Daft Punk	Virgin	
30 April	"I Like the Way"	Bodyrockers	Mercury	
7 May	"I Like the Way"	Bodyrockers	Mercury	
14 May	"Most Precious Love"	Blaze presents Uda featuring Barbara Tucker	Defected	
21 May	"Most Precious Love"	Blaze presents Uda featuring Barbara Tucker	Defected	
28 May	"In My Arms"	Mylo	Breastfed	
4 June	"Shot You Down"	Audio Bullys featuring Nancy Sinatra	Source	
11 June	"Shot You Down"	Audio Bullys featuring Nancy Sinatra	Source	
18 June	"Shot You Down"	Audio Bullys featuring Nancy Sinatra	Source	
25 June	"Shot You Down"	Audio Bullys featuring Nancy Sinatra	Source	
2 July	"Sugar"	Ladytron	Island	
9 July	"Tarantula" / "Fasten Your Seatbelt"	Pendulum featuring The Freestylers and Fresh	Breakbeat Kaos	
16 July	"Technologic"	Daft Punk	Virgin	
23 July	"Say Hello"	Deep Dish	Positiva	
30 July	"Shot You Down"	Audio Bullys featuring Nancy Sinatra	Source	
6 August	"Everybody"	Martin Solveig	Defected	
13 August	"Everybody"	Martin Solveig	Defected	
20 August	"Feel The Vibe (Til The Morning Comes)"	Axwell	Data	
27 August	"Little Love"	Lil' Love	Positiva	
3 September	"Love on My Mind"	Freemasons featuring Amanda Wilson	Loaded	
10 September	"Jacques Your Body (Make Me Sweat)"	Les Rythmes Digitales	Data	
17 September	"Doctor Pressure"	Mylo vs. Miami Sound Machine	Breastfed	
24 September	"Doctor Pressure"	Mylo vs. Miami Sound Machine	Breastfed	
1 October	"Slam" / "Out Here"	Pendulum	Breakbeat Kaos	
8 October	"Do Your Thing"	Basement Jaxx	XL	
15 October	"Voodoo People" / "Out of Space"	The Prodigy	XL	
22 October	"No More Conversations"	Freeform Five	Perspex	
29 October	"You Gonna Want Me"	Tiga	Different	
5 November	"Pump Up the Jam"	D.O.N.S. featuring Technotronic	Data	
12 November	"Voodoo People" / "Out of Space"	The Prodigy	XL	
19 November	"Hung Up"	Madonna	Warner Bros.	
26 November	"Hung Up"	Madonna	Warner Bros.	
3 December	"Hung Up"	Madonna	Warner Bros.	
10 December	"Hung Up"	Madonna	Warner Bros.	
17 December	"What Else Is There?"	Röyksopp	Wall of Sound	
24 December	"Your Body"	Tom Novy featuring Michael Marshall	Data	
31 December	"B*tch"	Dave McCullen	Nebula	

== See also ==
- List of number-one singles of 2005 (UK)
- List of UK Dance Albums Chart number ones of 2005
- List of UK Indie Chart number-one singles of 2005
- List of UK R&B Chart number-one singles of 2005
- List of UK Rock Chart number-one singles of 2005
