= List of UK Dance Albums Chart number ones of 2005 =

These are the Official Charts Company's UK Dance Chart number-one albums of 2005. The dates listed in the menus below represent the Saturday after the Sunday the chart was announced, as per the way the dates are given in chart publications such as the ones produced by Billboard, Guinness, and Virgin.

== Chart history ==
Issue date	Album	Artist(s)	Record label	Ref.
7 May	The Singles	Basement Jaxx	XL	
14 May	The Singles	Basement Jaxx	XL	
21 May	The Singles	Basement Jaxx	XL	
28 May	Forever Faithless – The Greatest Hits	Faithless	Cheeky	
4 June	Forever Faithless – The Greatest Hits	Faithless	Cheeky	
11 June	Forever Faithless – The Greatest Hits	Faithless	Cheeky	
18 June	Forever Faithless – The Greatest Hits	Faithless	Cheeky	
25 June	Forever Faithless – The Greatest Hits	Faithless	Cheeky	
2 July	The Singles	Basement Jaxx	XL	
9 July	The Singles	Basement Jaxx	XL	
16 July	The Understanding	Röyksopp	Wall of Sound	
23 July	Gatecrasher Classics	Various Artists	Ministry of Sound	
30 July	Gatecrasher Classics	Various Artists	Ministry of Sound	
6 August	Gatecrasher Classics	Various Artists	Ministry of Sound	
13 August	Gatecrasher Classics	Various Artists	Ministry of Sound	
20 August	Gatecrasher Classics	Various Artists	Ministry of Sound	
27 August	Forever Faithless – The Greatest Hits	Faithless	Cheeky	
3 September	Forever Faithless – The Greatest Hits	Faithless	Cheeky	
10 September	Forever Faithless – The Greatest Hits	Faithless	Cheeky	
17 September	Forever Faithless – The Greatest Hits	Faithless	Cheeky	
24 September	Forever Faithless – The Greatest Hits	Faithless	Cheeky	
1 October	Forever Faithless – The Greatest Hits	Faithless	Cheeky	
8 October	Forever Faithless – The Greatest Hits	Faithless	Cheeky	
15 October	Forever Faithless – The Greatest Hits	Faithless	Cheeky	
22 October	Forever Faithless – The Greatest Hits	Faithless	Cheeky	
29 October	Their Law: The Singles 1990–2005	The Prodigy	XL	
5 November	Their Law: The Singles 1990–2005	The Prodigy	XL	
12 November	Their Law: The Singles 1990–2005	The Prodigy	XL	
19 November	Their Law: The Singles 1990–2005	The Prodigy	XL	
26 November	Confessions on a Dance Floor	Madonna	Warner	
3 December	Confessions on a Dance Floor	Madonna	Warner	
10 December	Confessions on a Dance Floor	Madonna	Warner	
17 December	Confessions on a Dance Floor	Madonna	Warner	
24 December	Confessions on a Dance Floor	Madonna	Warner	
31 December	Confessions on a Dance Floor	Madonna	Warner	

== See also ==
- List of number-one albums of 2005 (UK)
- List of UK Dance Chart number-one singles of 2005
- List of UK R&B Chart number-one albums of 2005
