= Love + Hate (2005 film) =

British film

- Directed by: Dominic Savage
- Written by: Dominic Savage
- Produced by: Neris Thomas
- Starring: Samina Awan; Dean Andrews; Wasim Zakir; Nichola Burley; Mohammed Rafique
- Production companies: UK Film Council; BBC Films; Ruby Films; Italian International Film
- Distributed by: tbc
- Release date: 2005
- Running time: 86 min
- Language: English

Love + Hate is a 2005 British drama film directed by Dominic Savage.

== Plot ==
Love + Hate is a modern love story set across the racial divide in a town in northern England. Adam has been brought up in a White British home and community that fosters racism. Naseema is a British Pakistani girl from the same town. But what Adam and Naseema really share is a secret desire to break free of their small town and its inhibitions, something they discover while working together in a DIY store. At first resistant, they cannot avoid their mutual attraction, and embark on a relationship which threatens to bring down their families as well as themselves.

== Location ==
Love + Hate was filmed in Blackburn, Lancashire, and partially set in a wallpaper shop in the town.

== Cast ==
- Miriam Ali – Naseema's mother
- Dean Andrews – Derek
- Samina Awan – Naseema
- Liam Barr – Sean's friend
- Liam Boyle – Steve
- Nichola Burley – Michelle
- Tom Hudson – Adam
- Ryan Leslie – Sean
- Matthew McNulty – Shane
- Peter O'Connor – Pete
- Mohammed Rafique – Naseema's father
- Wasim Zakir – Yousif (as Was Zakir)
- Aliya Bhatti – Azara
- Tracy Brabin – Gaynor
- Katy Sharples – Roxanne
- Umar Ali – Umar
- Stephen Swan – Lifeguard

== Soundtrack ==
- "Perfect Little Secret", Snow Patrol
- "Run", Snow Patrol
- "Play", Stephen Fretwell
- "Sweet Fantastic", Ian Brown
- "Sunshine", Keane
