= 2005 in British music =

This is a summary of 2005 in music in the United Kingdom.

== Summary ==
On 14 January pop rock band Busted announced that they were to split. The band had released two albums and topped the singles chart four times. Other British artists who did well in the charts included The Chemical Brothers, James Blunt, McFly, Sugababes, Arctic Monkeys, Damon Albarn's Gorillaz, Oasis and Robbie Williams. Stereophonics earned their first number-one single with "Dakota" followed closely by their fourth consecutive number-one album Language. Sex. Violence. Other?. Kate Bush returned to the music world after a 12-year absence with the single "King of the Mountain", which became her biggest UK hit in 20 years by reaching No. 4, and was followed on 7 November by the double album Aerial, which reached No. 3 and was certified platinum.

The Comic Relief single of the year, the double A-side of "All About You" and "You've Got a Friend" by McFly, reached the top of the chart on 13 March. It was knocked off by a second Comic Relief single – a reissue of Tony Christie's "Is This the Way to Amarillo" with the associated video that featured comedian Peter Kay alongside various guest stars.

Headliners at the major festivals included: The Foo Fighters and Green Day at T in the Park; Faithless, Morrissey and R.E.M. at the Isle of Wight Festival; Feeder, Black Sabbath and System of a Down at the Download Festival; Scissor Sisters and Oasis at V Festival; Basement Jaxx and Faithless at Creamfields; New Order, Basement Jaxx, Keane and Kasabian at the Wireless Festival; Foo Fighters, Pixies and Iron Maiden at the Carling Weekend, while Glastonbury seen White Stripes, Coldplay and Basement Jaxx headline.

The world of jazz and avant garde music lost one of its pioneers at the end of this year, with the death of free improvising guitarist Derek Bailey on Christmas Day.

In addition to his appearance at the Pink Floyd reunion, Roger Waters released his first opera, Ça Ira. , as a CD, with Bryn Terfel among the performers. Another "crossover" composer, Christian Forshaw, brought out Mortal Flesh, notable for featuring saxophone as the lead instrument in a classical work. Other British composers with new works included successful film composer Stephen Warbeck, who scored a new ballet, Peter Pan, and Northern Irish composer Ian Wilson, whose concerto, Sullen Earth, had its first performance. For the wedding of Prince Charles and Camilla Parker Bowles, Alun Hoddinott produced a Celebration Fanfare, and another Welsh composer, Karl Jenkins, released his Requiem, which quickly topped the classical charts. Master of the Queen's Music, Sir Peter Maxwell Davies, continued his series of Naxos Quartets with Nos. 6 and 7.

Extracts from James Whitbourn's new oratorio, Annelies (based on The Diary of Anne Frank) were first performed at the National UK Holocaust Memorial Day in Westminster Hall, London on 27 January; the full première of the work took place in April.

== Events ==
- 22 January – The Tsunami Relief concert is held at the Millennium Stadium, Cardiff, Wales – the largest live music event in the UK since the Live Aid concert of 1985. Performers included Madonna, Eric Clapton, Jools Holland, Manic Street Preachers, Lulu, Aled Jones, Charlotte Church, Katherine Jenkins, Feeder, Snow Patrol, and Liberty X.
- 2 February – Pete Doherty, former lead singer with the Libertines and frontman of Babyshambles, is arrested after an altercation with documentary filmmaker Max Carlish, who was making a rockumentary about the singer. He is released on bail five days later by his record company, and the charges are dropped due to lack of evidence.
- 7 February – The Brit Awards ceremony is held in London.
- 17 April – Digital downloads are included in the chart for the first time, but only for sales of a record with an equivalent physical release.
- 2 May – Blues-rock group Cream reunite for four shows in London's Royal Albert Hall.
- 12 June – Pink Floyd announce that they will reunite with former bassist Roger Waters, who left the band in 1985, on 2 July for the Live 8 London concert. This would be the first time the band played together as a quartet since The Wall tour in 1981, and the first public performance by Pink Floyd since 1994.
- 16 June – Motörhead celebrate their 30th anniversary with a concert in the Hammersmith Apollo, which is later released on DVD.
- 2 September – A statue of Edward Elgar by Jemma Pearson is unveiled near Hereford Cathedral.
- 17 December – Shayne Ward is named the winner of the second series of The X Factor. Andy Abraham is named the runner-up, while Journey South and Brenda Edwards finish third and fourth, respectively.
- 21 December – Elton John marries David Furnish in London. The marriage comes in the wake of new British laws affording gay unions the same legal protection enjoyed within straight marriages.
- 22 December – Amelle Berrabah joins the Sugababes, replacing founding member Mutya Buena who left on 21 December.

== Classical music ==
- Christian Forshaw – Mortal Flesh
- Alun Hoddinott – Celebration Fanfare (one-off composition for the wedding of Prince Charles and Camilla Parker Bowles)
- Karl Jenkins – Requiem: In These Horizons Stones Sing
- Peter Maxwell Davies
  - Naxos Quartet No. 6
  - Naxos Quartet No. 7
- John Tavener – Fragment for the Virgin, written for violinist Nicola Benedetti.
- Stephen Warbeck – Peter Pan (ballet)
- Ian Wilson – Sullen Earth (concerto)

== Musical films ==
- Mrs Henderson Presents, starring Judi Dench and Will Young

== Musical theatre ==
- 11 May – Billy Elliot the Musical, with music by Elton John, and book and lyrics by Lee Hall, is officially premièred at the Victoria Palace Theatre.
- October – Thalidomide!! A Musical, by Mat Fraser, is premièred at Battersea Arts Centre, London.

== Film scores ==
- Patrick Doyle – Nanny McPhee
- Nicholas Hooper – The Girl in the Café
- Joby Talbot – The Hitchhiker's Guide to the Galaxy
- Stephen Warbeck – Proof

== Births ==
- 19 February – Alma Deutscher, composer, pianist, violinist and conductor

== Deaths ==
- 1 January – Hugh Davies, composer and musicologist, 61
- 2 January – Bernard Barrell, musician, composer and teacher, 85
- 12 January – Ruth Packer, operatic soprano, 94
- 28 January – Jim Capaldi, drummer and vocalist, 60
- 29 January – Eric Griffiths, Welsh-Scottish guitarist (The Quarrymen), 64
- 30 January – Martyn Bennett, Scottish bagpiper, 33 (cancer)
- 6 February – David Measham, conductor, 67
- 18 February – Brian Cookman, musician, composer and artist, 58 (cancer)
- 28 February – Chris Curtis, drummer and vocalist, 63
- 6 March – Tommy Vance, DJ, 63
- 9 March
  - Meredith Davies, conductor, 82
  - Kathie Kay, big band singer, 86
- 28 March – Moura Lympany, pianist, 88
- 21 April – Cyril Tawney, traditional singer, 74
- 18 June – Basil Kirchin, drummer and composer, 77
- 21 July
  - Long John Baldry, R&B singer, 64
  - Michael Chapman, English bassoon player, 70
- 6 August – James Wilson, composer, 82
- 13 August – Arnold Cooke, composer, 98
- 15 September – Wilfrid Holland, pianist, conductor and composer, 85
- 5 November – Dennis Armitage, jazz pianist, saxophonist and painter, 77
- 26 November – Mark Craney, drummer (Jethro Tull, Jean-Luc Ponty), 53
- 3 December – Lance Dossor, pianist, 89
- 14 December – Gordon Duncan, bagpiper and composer, 41
- 17 December – Trevor Duncan, composer, 81
- 25 December
  - Derek Bailey, guitarist, 75
  - Gladys Midgley, pianist, 94
- date unknown – Philip Marshall, organist and composer, 84

== Music awards ==
=== Brit Awards ===
The 2005 Brit Awards winners were:

- Best British Male Solo Artist: The Streets
- Best British Female Solo Artist: Joss Stone
- Best British Group: Franz Ferdinand
- Best British Album: Keane – Hopes and Fears
- Best British Single: Will Young – "Your Game"
- Best British Breakthrough Act: Keane
- Best British Urban Act: Joss Stone
- Best British Rock Act: Franz Ferdinand
- Best British Live Act: Muse
- Best Pop Act: Mcfly
- Best International Male Solo Artist: Eminem
- Best International Female Solo Artist: Gwen Stefani
- International Breakthrough Artist: Scissor Sisters
- Best International Group: Scissor Sisters
- Best International Album: Scissor Sisters – Scissor Sisters
- Outstanding Contribution to Music: Bob Geldof

A Special BRITs 25 Award for the best single from the past 25 years was awarded to Robbie Williams – "Angels".

=== Classical BRITs ===
- Female Artist of the Year – Marin Alsop
- Male Artist of the Year – Bryn Terfel
- Album of the Year – Katherine Jenkins – Second Nature
- Ensemble/Orchestral Album of the Year – Harry Christophers and The Sixteen – Renaissance
- Contemporary Music Award – John Adams – On the Transmigration of Souls
- Soundtrack Composer Award – John Williams – Harry Potter and the Prisoner of Azkaban and The Terminal
- Young British Classical Performer – Natalie Clein
- Critics' Award – Stephen Hough – Rachmaninov Piano Concertos
- Outstanding Contribution to Music – James Galway

=== Mercury Music Prize ===
The 2005 Mercury Music Prize was awarded to Antony and the Johnsons – I Am a Bird Now

=== Popjustice £20 Music Prize ===
The 2005 Popjustice £20 Music Prize was awarded to Girls Aloud for their song "Wake Me Up" from the album What Will the Neighbours Say?

=== The Record of the Year ===
The Record of the Year was awarded to "You Raise Me Up" by Westlife.

== See also ==
- 2005 in British music charts
- 2005 in British radio
- 2005 in British television
- 2005 in the United Kingdom
- List of British films of 2005
