= Samina Awan =

British-born actress

- Born: Samina Awan; 3 January 1985 (age 40); Burnley, Lancashire, United Kingdom
- Occupation: Actress

Samina Awan (born 3 January 1985) is a British-born actress best known for her role as Naseema in Love + Hate (2005) and has been nominated for a BIFA. She is of Pakistani origin.

== Life and career ==
Samina's role in Love + Hate, won her a nomination for a BIFA for "Most Promising Newcomer", hence landing her Dallas Smith as her agent at United Agents. Since then alongside other projects she has completed A-level and went on to complete a degree in biomedical sciences. She has completed a project based in Cornwall and is currently talking with directors about another feature film based in South West England. Critics have compared her to Keira Knightley due to her facial structure. Samina won the role in a Bollywood feature to play the title role Sofia, however complications with the script have halted this process. She has given many interviews, notably with Times Magazine 'Me a star? – no its just a good act'. Since then she has served the community and actively taken part in many projects. She cut the ribbon at the reopening of a youth hostel in Burnley.
