= List of UK Independent Singles Chart number ones of 2005 =

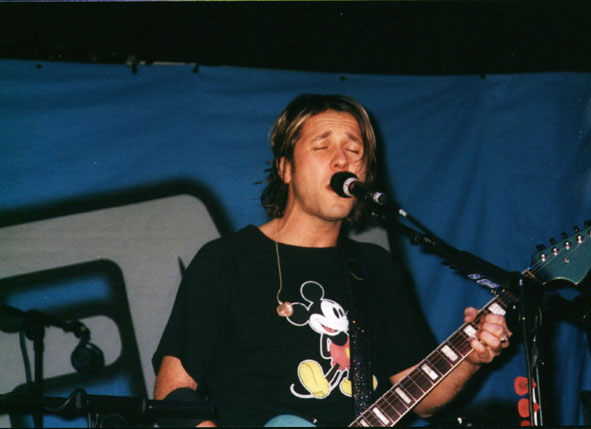
British band Feeder topped the UK Indie Chart with three different singles during 2005.

The UK Indie Chart is a weekly chart that ranks the biggest-selling singles that are released on independent record labels in the United Kingdom. The chart is compiled by the Official Charts Company, and is based on both physical and digital single sales. During 2005, at least 37 singles reached number one; "Out of Touch" started its peak during 2004.

The biggest-selling indie hit of 2005 was "Axel F" by Crazy Frog, which sold more than 525,000 copies by the end of the year and topped the UK Singles Chart for four consecutive weeks. Other high-selling indie hits included "JCB" by Nizlopi, which sold over 295,000 singles despite being available for only 20 days, and "I Bet You Look Good on the Dancefloor", the debut single from Arctic Monkeys, which sold over 174,000 copies and reached number one on the UK Singles Chart in its first week of release.

At least eight acts managed to top the UK Indie Chart with two different singles. They were: The Killers, Uniting Nations, The Rakes, Bloc Party, Paul Weller, Babyshambles, Kaiser Chiefs and The White Stripes. Feeder were the only act to reach number one with three different singles.

== Chart history ==
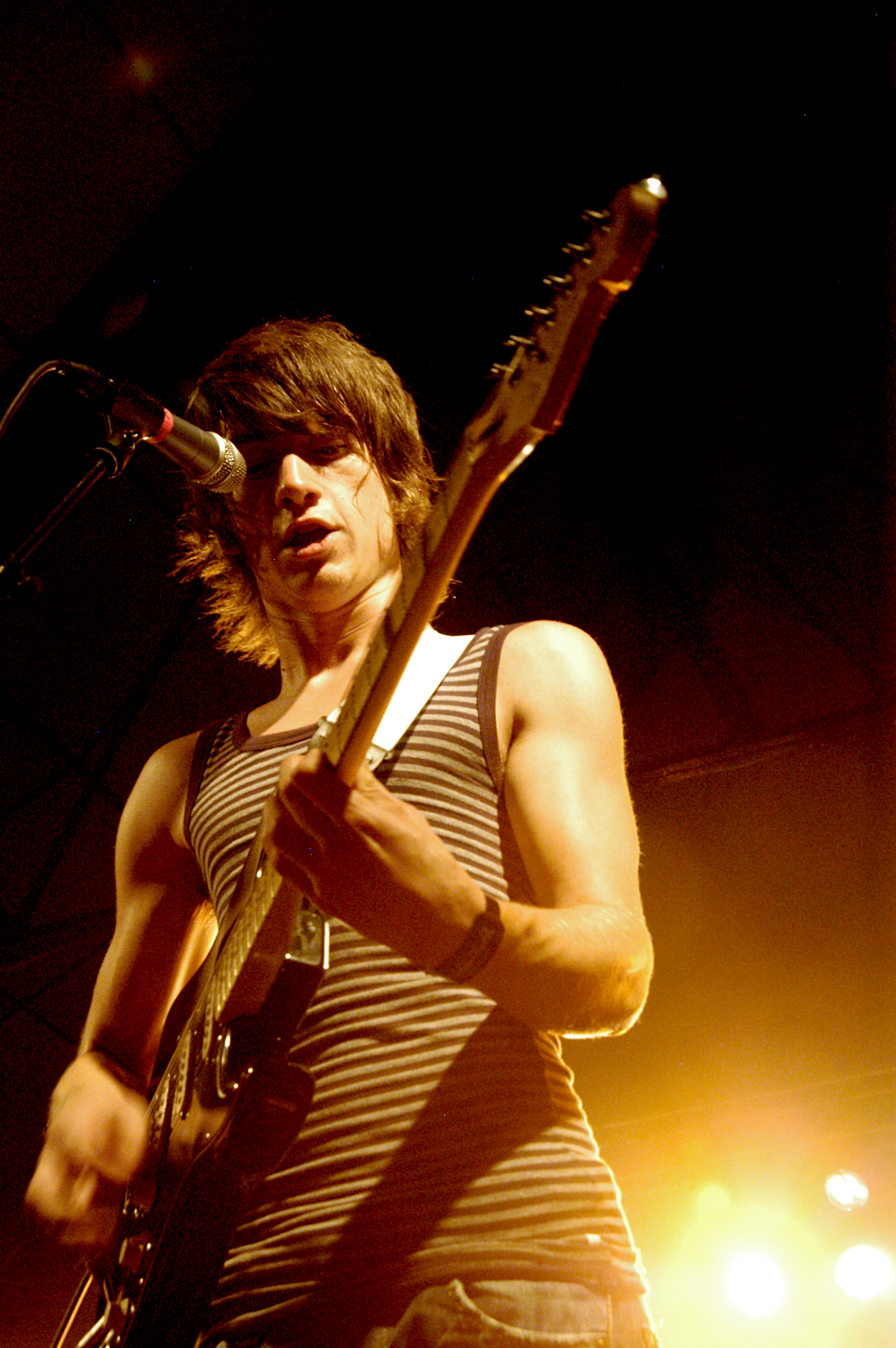
Arctic Monkeys topped the UK Indie Chart with their debut single "I Bet You Look Good on the Dancefloor".

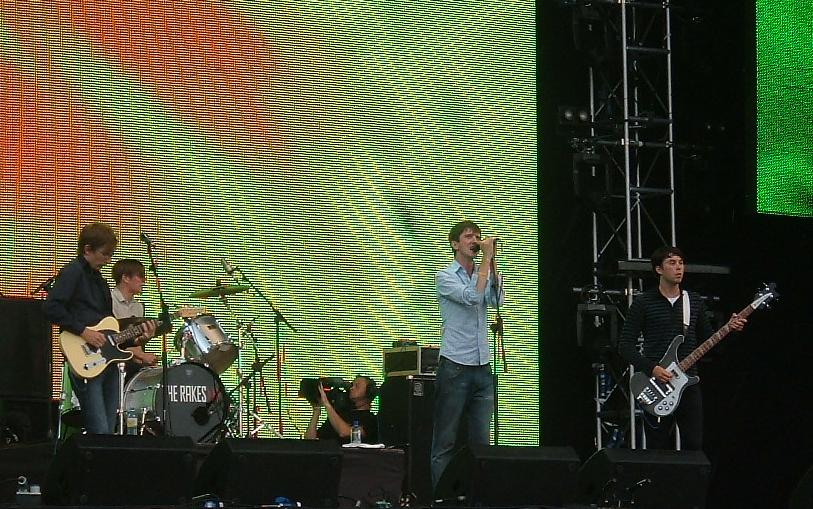
British band The Rakes topped the UK Indie Chart twice during 2005.

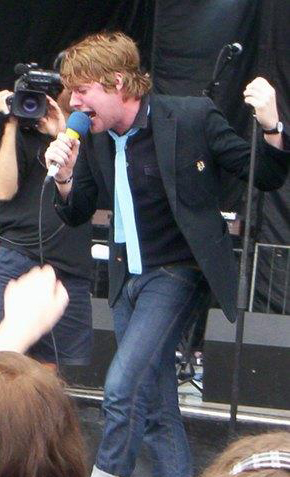
Ricky Wilson reached the top of the UK Indie Chart three times during 2005 with his band Kaiser Chiefs.

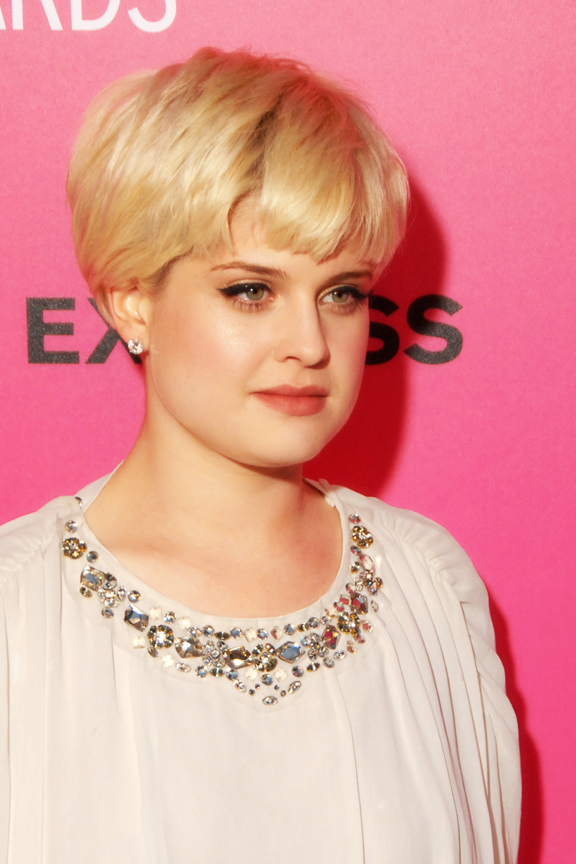
Kelly Osbourne had her first solo indie number one with the track "One Word".

Key
†	Best-selling indie single of the year

Issue date	Song	Artist(s)	Ref.(s)
2 January	"Out of Touch"	Uniting Nations	
9 January	"Out of Touch"	Uniting Nations	
16 January	"Somebody Told Me"	The Killers	
23 January	"Tumble and Fall"	Feeder	
30 January	"Grief Never Grows Old"	One World Project	
6 February	"So Here We Are/Positive Tension"	Bloc Party	
13 February	"Angel Eyes"	Raghav	
20 February	"Angel Eyes"	Raghav	
27 February	"Oh My God"	Kaiser Chiefs	
6 March ^{[a]}	"Dakota"	Stereophonics	
13 March	"Dakota"	Stereophonics	
20 March	"Oh My Gosh"	Basement Jaxx	
27 March	"It Ended on an Oily Stage"	British Sea Power	
3 April	"Redondo Beach/There Is a Light That Never Goes Out"	Morrissey	
10 April	"Feeling a Moment"	Feeder	
17 April	"C'mere"	Interpol	
24 April	"Retreat"	The Rakes	
1 May	"Refugees"	The Tears	
8 May	"Smile Like You Mean It"	The Killers	
15 May	"One Word"	Kelly Osbourne	
22 May	"Everyday I Love You Less and Less"	Kaiser Chiefs	
29 May ^{[a]}	"Axel F" †	Crazy Frog	
5 June ^{[a]}	"Axel F" †	Crazy Frog	
12 June ^{[a]}	"Axel F" †	Crazy Frog	
19 June ^{[a]}	"Axel F" †	Crazy Frog	
26 June	"Axel F" †	Crazy Frog	
3 July	"Axel F" †	Crazy Frog	
10 July	"Axel F" †	Crazy Frog	
17 July	"Axel F" †	Crazy Frog	
24 July	"From the Floorboards Up"	Paul Weller	
31 July	"You and Me"	Uniting Nations	
7 August	"Work, Work, Work (Pub, Club, Sleep)"	The Rakes	
14 August	"You and Me"	Uniting Nations	
21 August	"Fuck Forever"	Babyshambles	
28 August	"My Doorbell"	The White Stripes	
4 September	"Forget Myself"	Elbow	
11 September	"The Party Ain't Over Yet"	Status Quo	
18 September	"Rebellion (Lies)"	Arcade Fire	
25 September	"Do You Want To"	Franz Ferdinand	
2 October	"Come On/Let's Go"	Paul Weller	
9 October	"Two More Years"	Bloc Party	
16 October	"Shatter/Tender"	Feeder	
23 October ^{[a]}	"I Bet You Look Good on the Dancefloor"	Arctic Monkeys	
30 October	"I Bet You Look Good on the Dancefloor"	Arctic Monkeys	
6 November	"I Bet You Look Good on the Dancefloor"	Arctic Monkeys	
13 November	"I Bet You Look Good on the Dancefloor"	Arctic Monkeys	
20 November	"The Denial Twist"	The White Stripes	
27 November	"Rewind"	Stereophonics	
4 December	"Albion"	Babyshambles	
11 December	"Juicebox"	The Strokes	
18 December ^{[a]}	"JCB"	Nizlopi	
25 December	"JCB"	Nizlopi	

== Notes ==
- ^{a} – The single was simultaneously number-one on the singles chart.

== See also ==
- List of UK Dance Singles Chart number ones of 2005
- List of UK Dance Albums Chart number ones of 2005
- List of UK Singles Downloads Chart number ones of the 2000s
- List of UK Rock & Metal Singles Chart number ones of 2005
- List of UK Singles Chart number ones of the 2000s
