= The Boy with a Thorn in His Side =

- Directed by: Mark Jeavonsa
- Written by: Mark Jeavonsa
- Produced by: Peter Robert Ball; Mark Jeavonsa
- Starring: Alec Sedgley; Graham Pollard; Sue Kimberley; Morgan Lees
- Cinematography: Ben Sampays
- Edited by: James Booth
- Music by: Justin R. Durban
- Release date: 19 May 2005 (Cannes Film Festival)
- Running time: 92 minutes
- Country: United Kingdom
- Language: English
- Budget: £5,000 (est)

The Boy with a Thorn in His Side is a 2005 comedy film, produced and directed by Mark Jeavonsa as his feature film debut, and starring Alec Sedgley as Billy Heinlickburger.

== Background ==
Boy With A Thorn was shot in Birmingham and Wolverhampton in the West Midlands, England over a period of 17 days, because that was the length of time director Mark Jeavonsa was allowed to use the equipment. The director relates that he devoted most of 2004 in preparing to make the film, spending the first half of the year seeking funding for a feature before learning about the government-funded 'Media Vault' program that would allow West Midlands filmmakers access to filming equipment, but for only 17 days. The first draft of the film had been written in 2001. After arranging for the use of the equipment for a period three months later, he re-wrote the draft to create it as a project that could be shot within his time constraints and began his pre-production and casting.

The film premiered 18 May 2009 at the Cannes Film Festival, and later screened at independent cinemas in the United Kingdom

== Synopsis ==
Billy Heinlickburger (Alec Sedgley) is 18, has no job, and no friends. He daydreams about a becoming rock star or artist or best-selling author, but fails to follow through with any of his aspirations due to his not wanting to work. He wishes to get back together with his slightly older ex-girlfriend, Susan (Morgan Lees). She has moved forward with her life, but agrees to a few dates anyway. Billy's German parents, Jurgen Heinlickburger (Graham Pollard) and Gertrude Heinlickburger (Sue Kimberley), are both eccentric. Jurgen has for 30 years maintained a monotonous diet of Spam sandwiches and raw carrots. Gertrude is simply and totally paranoid about everything. But they both pressure Billy continually to leave home and get a job. This constant friction forces Billy to decide once and for all if he will change his ways.

== Cast ==
- Alec Sedgley as Billy Heinlickburger
- Graham Pollard as Jurgen Heinlickburger
- Sue Kimberley as Gertrude Heinlickburger
- Morgan Lees as Susan
- Neil Harris as Felix
- Emily Dormer as Emma
- Michael Haynes as Farmer
- Rob Leetham as Job Interviewer
- Martin Nigel Davey as TV Reporter
- Victoria Broom as Office worker
- Gary Stevens as Security Guard

== Reception ==
Microfilmmaker Magazine wrote that this was an interesting story, in that it could apply to many different person's lives. They offered that "Alec Sedgley did a good job at portraying the rather lazy and childish Billy", due to his seeming to personally understand the problems and frustrations faced by a young adult. They also offered that actress Morgan Lees did a good job as Susan in her "portraying the sympathetic and down-to-earth ex-girlfriend, who is trying to be encouraging." They also approved of Neil Harris' portrayal of Susan's roommate Felix who, even though verbally referred to in context as a boyfriend to her, dresses and acts in a flamboyant manner leading viewers to assume Felix was more interested in men than in women. Itwa stressed though that the best acting in the film was done by Graham Pollard and Sue Kimberley in their portrayal of Billy's very odd German parents.
