= List of UK Rock & Metal Singles Chart number ones of 2005 =

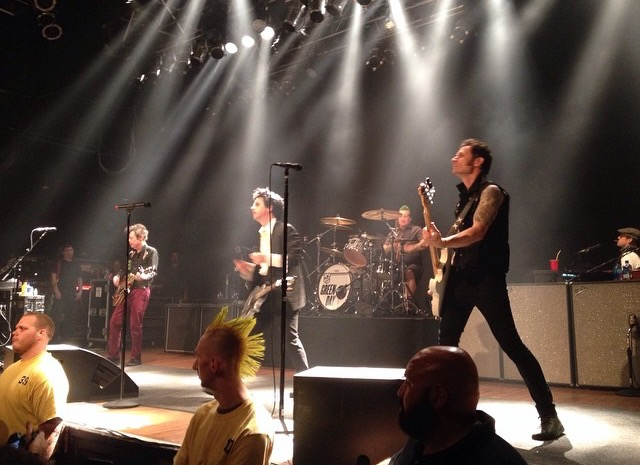
"Wake Me Up When September Ends" by Green Day was the longest-running number-one single of 2005, spending seven weeks atop the chart. The band also reached number one with "Boulevard of Broken Dreams" and "Holiday".

The UK Rock & Metal Singles Chart is a record chart which ranks the best-selling rock and heavy metal songs in the United Kingdom. Compiled and published by the Official Charts Company, the data is based on each track's weekly physical sales, digital downloads and streams. In 2005, there were 23 singles that topped the 52 published charts. The first number-one single of the year was "Boulevard of Broken Dreams" by American pop punk band Green Day, which spent the first two weeks of the year atop the chart at the end of a five-week run beginning in December 2004. The final number-one single of the year was "One Way Ticket", the lead single from One Way Ticket to Hell... and Back, the second album by The Darkness, which spent the last six weeks of the 2005 (and the first four of 2005) at number one.

The most successful song on the UK Rock & Metal Singles Chart in 2005 was "Wake Me Up When September Ends" by Green Day, which spent seven weeks at number one. "Boulevard of Broken Dreams" also spent seven weeks at number one, while "Holiday" was number one for four weeks. "Somewhere Else" by Razorlight spent five weeks and "One Way Ticket" by The Darkness spent six weeks at number one, Iron Maiden spent four weeks at number one with "The Number of the Beast" and "The Trooper", and Foo Fighters spent three weeks at number one with "Best of You" (two weeks) and "DOA" (one week). Nine Black Alps topped the chart for three weeks "Unsatisfied" (One Week) and "Just Friends" (Two Weeks), Rammstein topped the chart with "Keine Lust" and "Benzin", Nine Inch Nails topped the chart with "The Hand That Feeds" and "Only", My Chemical Romance topped the chart with "Helena" and "The Ghost of You" and songs by HIM, and Nickelback all spent two weeks atop the chart.

== Chart history ==
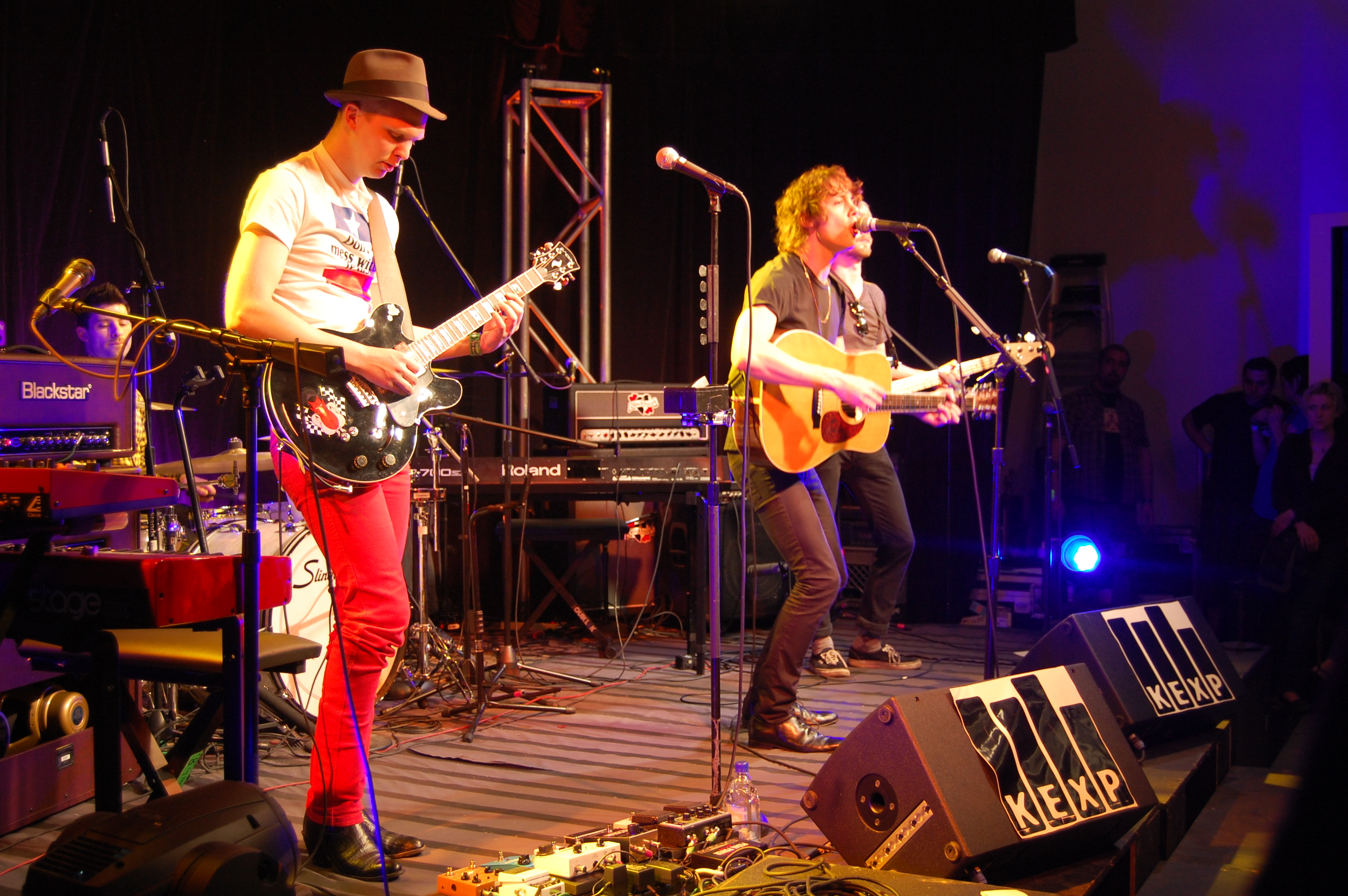
Razorlight's "Somewhere Else" spent six weeks at number one.

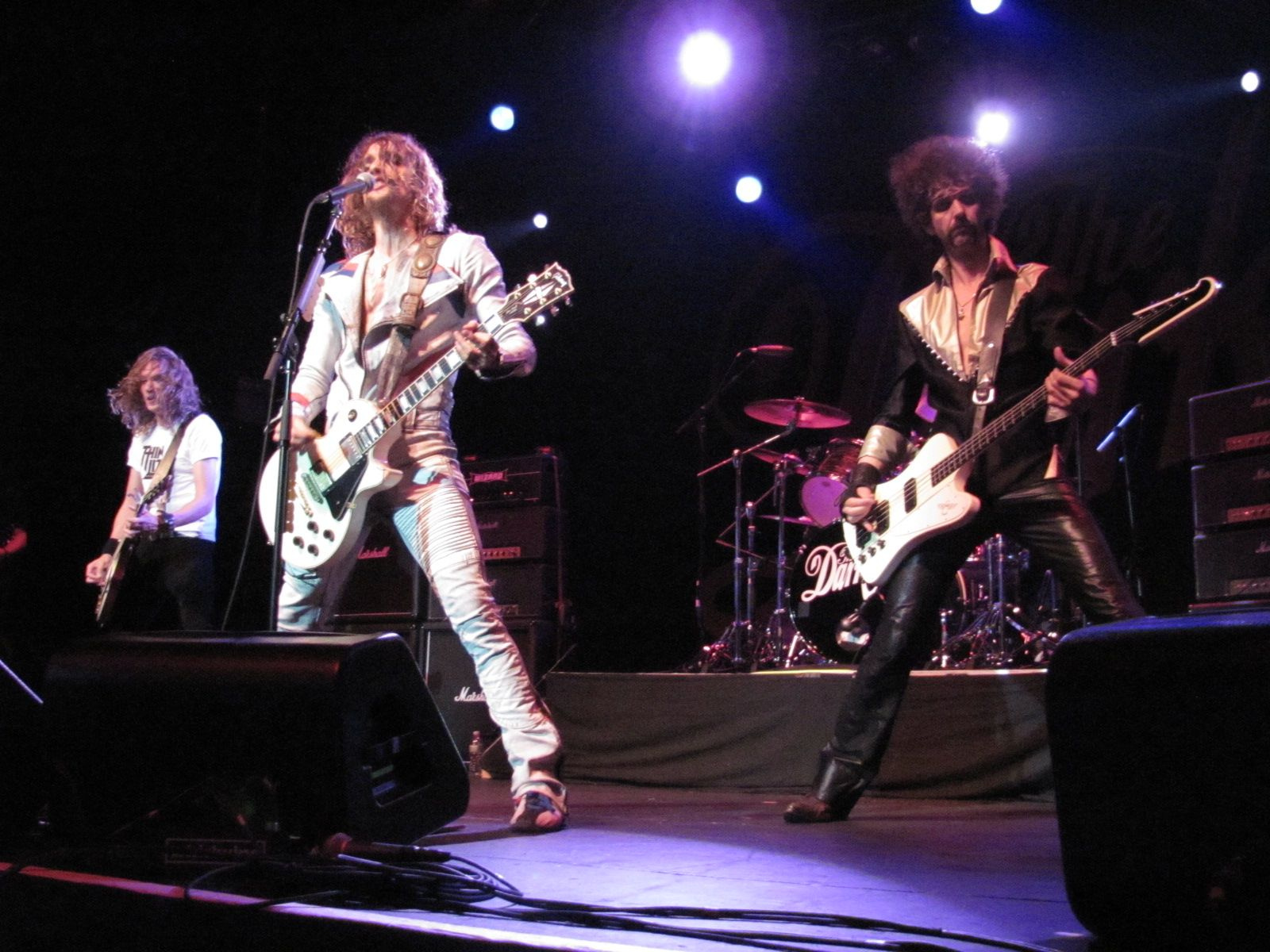
The Darkness spent the last six weeks of 2005 (and the first four of 2006) at number one with "One Way Ticket".

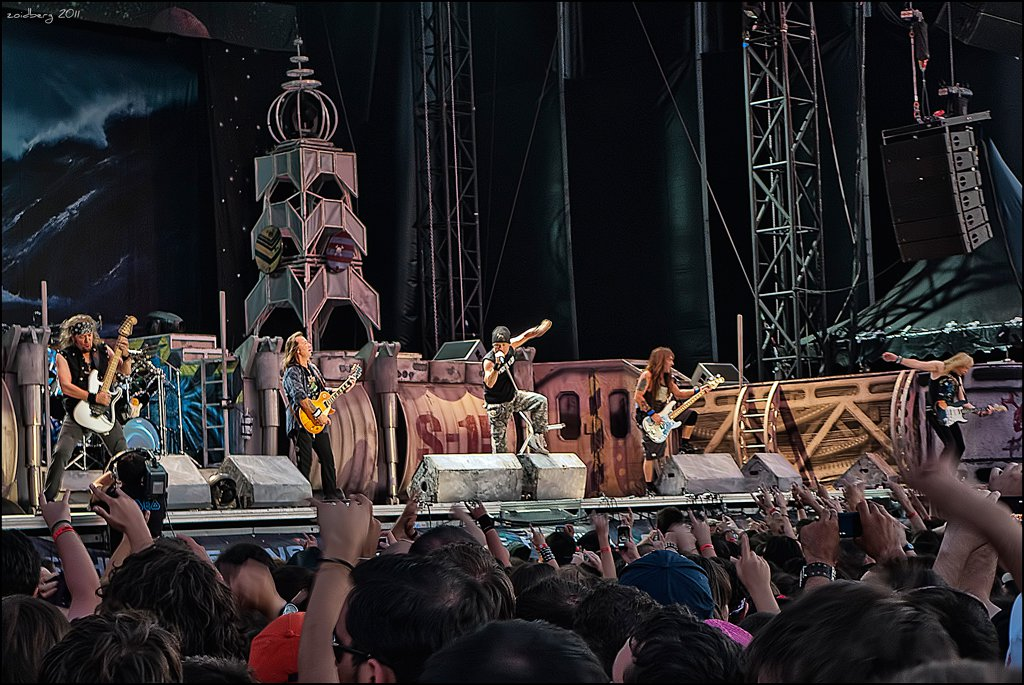
Iron Maiden topped the chart with two songs in 2005, each for two weeks: "The Number of the Beast" and "The Trooper".

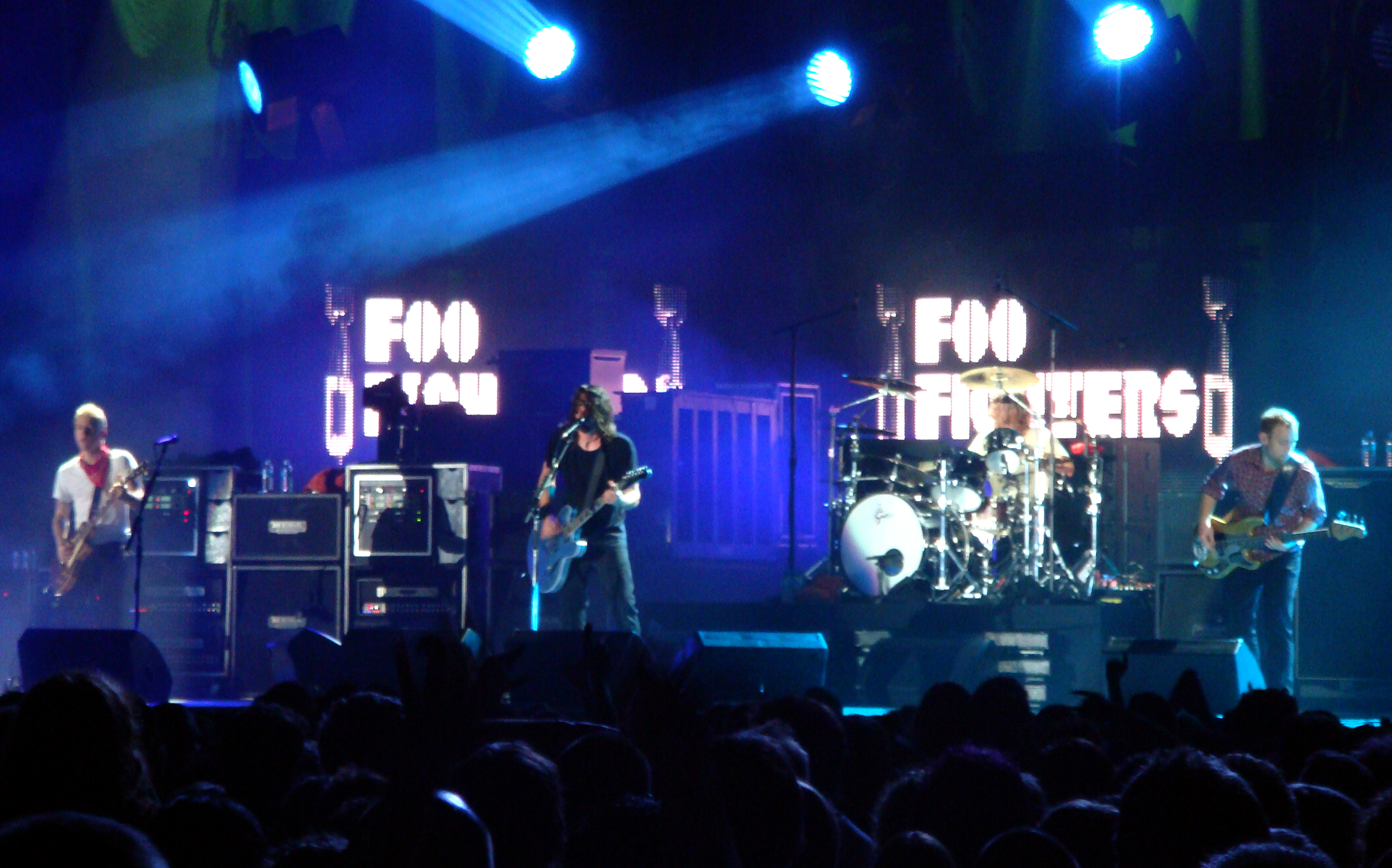
Foo Fighters spent three weeks at number one in 2005 with "Best of You" (two weeks) and "DOA" (one week).

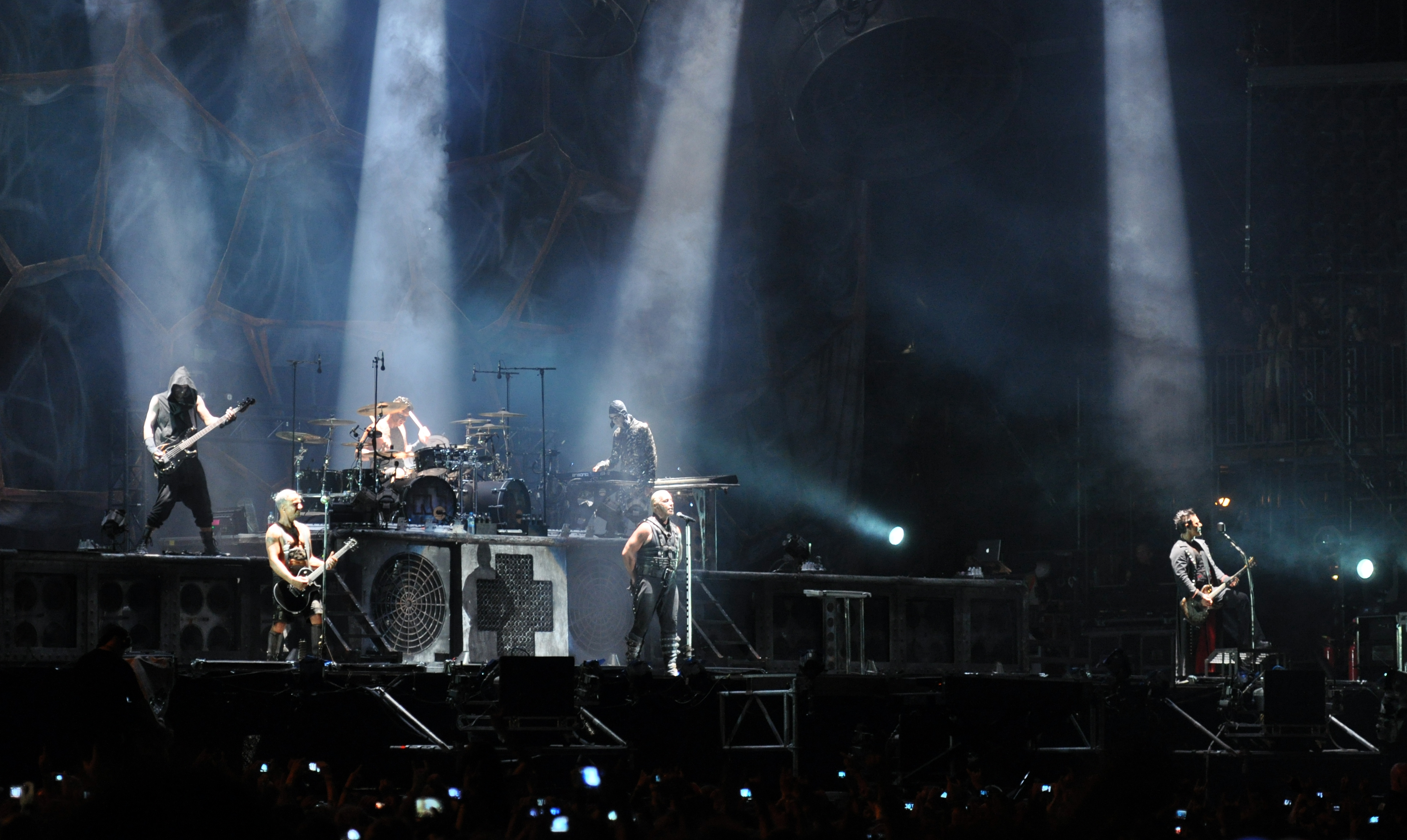
Rammstein topped the chart in 2005 with "Keine Lust" and "Benzin".

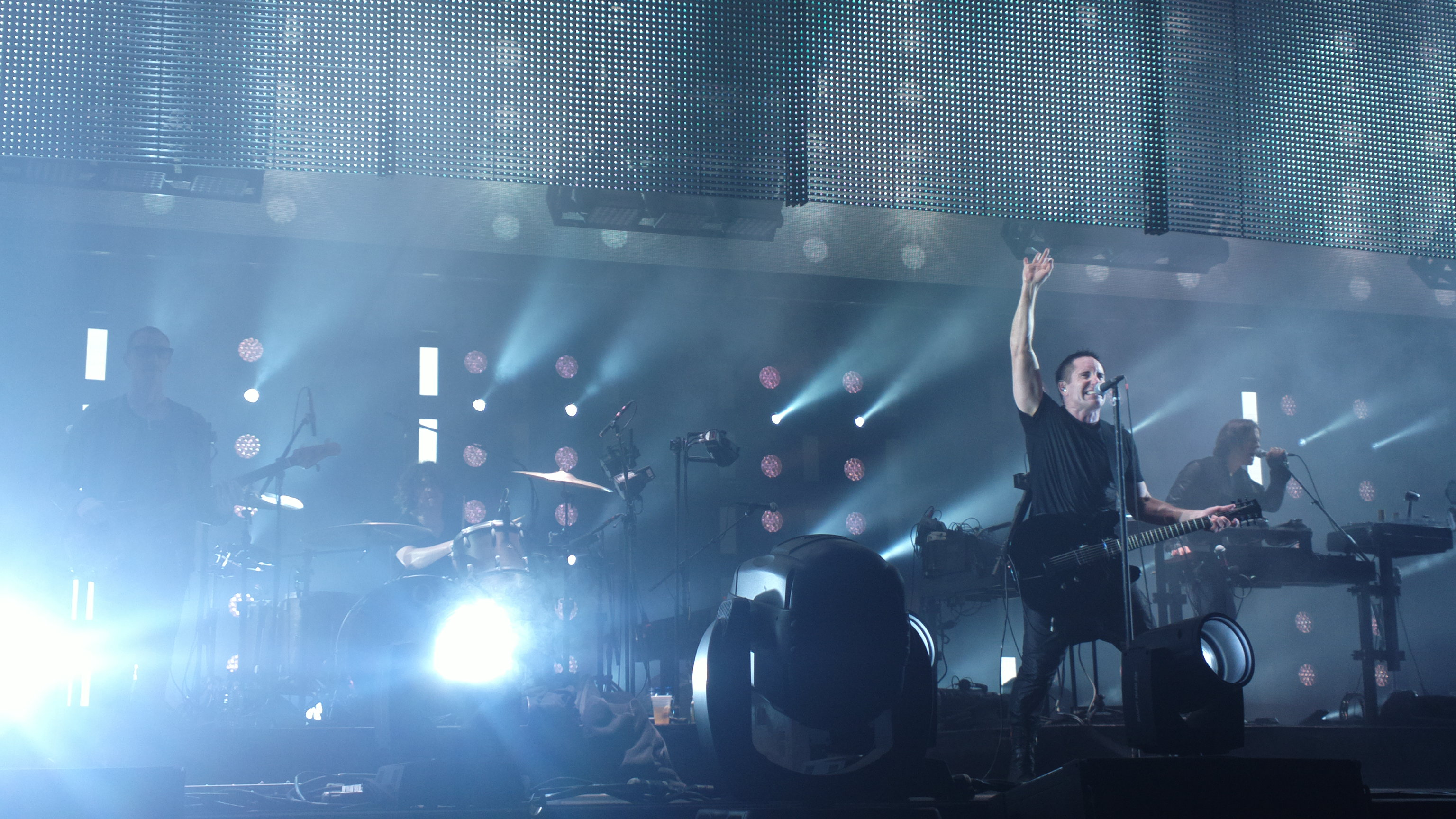
Nine Inch Nails reached number one with "The Hand That Feeds" and "Only".

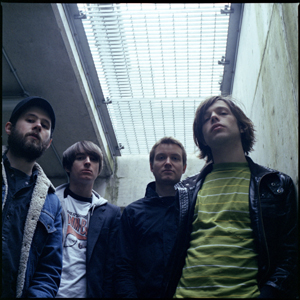
Nine Black Alps reached number one with "Unsatisfied" and "Just Friends".

Issue date	Single	Artist(s)	Record label(s)	Ref.
1 January	"Boulevard of Broken Dreams"	Green Day	Reprise	
8 January	"Boulevard of Broken Dreams"	Green Day	Reprise	
15 January	"The Number of the Beast"	Iron Maiden	EMI	
22 January	"The Number of the Beast"	Iron Maiden	EMI	
29 January	"Boulevard of Broken Dreams"	Green Day	Reprise	
5 February	"Boulevard of Broken Dreams"	Green Day	Reprise	
12 February	"I Just Wanna Live"	Good Charlotte	Epic	
19 February	"Boulevard of Broken Dreams"	Green Day	Reprise	
26 February	"Boulevard of Broken Dreams"	Green Day	Reprise	
5 March	"Boulevard of Broken Dreams"	Green Day	Reprise	
12 March	"Keine Lust"	Rammstein	Universal	
19 March	"On a Noose"	Towers of London	TVT	
26 March	"Holiday"	Green Day	Reprise	
2 April	"Holiday"	Green Day	Reprise	
9 April	"Holiday"	Green Day	Reprise	
16 April	"Holiday"	Green Day	Reprise	
23 April	"Somewhere Else"	Razorlight	Vertigo	
30 April	"The Hand That Feeds"	Nine Inch Nails	Island	
7 May	"Somewhere Else"	Razorlight	Vertigo	
14 May	"Somewhere Else"	Razorlight	Vertigo	
21 May	"Somewhere Else"	Razorlight	Vertigo	
28 May	"Somewhere Else"	Razorlight	Vertigo	
4 June	"Helena"	My Chemical Romance	Reprise	
11 June	"Best of You"	Foo Fighters	RCA	
18 June	"Best of You"	Foo Fighters	RCA	
25 June	"Wake Me Up When September Ends"	Green Day	Reprise	
2 July	"Wake Me Up When September Ends"	Green Day	Reprise	
9 July	"Wake Me Up When September Ends"	Green Day	Reprise	
16 July	"Wake Me Up When September Ends"	Green Day	Reprise	
23 July	"Wake Me Up When September Ends"	Green Day	Reprise	
30 July	"Wake Me Up When September Ends"	Green Day	Reprise	
6 August	"Only"	Nine Inch Nails	Island	
13 August	"Wake Me Up When September Ends"	Green Day	Reprise	
20 August	"Unsatisfied"	Nine Black Alps	Island	
27 August	"The Trooper"	Iron Maiden	EMI	
3 September	"The Trooper"	Iron Maiden	EMI	
10 September	"The Ghost of You"	My Chemical Romance	Reprise	
17 September	"DOA"	Foo Fighters	RCA	
24 September	"Wings of a Butterfly"	HIM	Sire	
1 October	"Wings of a Butterfly"	HIM	Sire	
8 October	"Photograph"	Nickelback	Roadrunner	
15 October	"Photograph"	Nickelback	Roadrunner	
22 October	"So You Know"	InMe	Pandora's Box	
29 October	"Benzin"	Rammstein	Universal	
5 November	"Almost"	Bowling for Soup	Jive	
12 November	"Just Friends"	Nine Black Alps	Island	
19 November	"Just Friends"	Nine Black Alps	Island	
26 November	"One Way Ticket"	The Darkness	Atlantic	
3 December	"One Way Ticket"	The Darkness	Atlantic	
10 December	"One Way Ticket"	The Darkness	Atlantic	
17 December	"One Way Ticket"	The Darkness	Atlantic	
24 December	"One Way Ticket"	The Darkness	Atlantic	
31 December	"One Way Ticket"	The Darkness	Atlantic	

== See also ==
- 2005 in British music
- List of UK Rock & Metal Albums Chart number ones of 2005
