= List of UK R&B Albums Chart number ones of 2005 =

The logo of the Official Charts Company, responsible for compiling all of the official music charts in the United Kingdom, including the R&B albums chart.

The UK R&B Chart is a weekly chart, first introduced in October 1994, that ranks the 40 biggest-selling singles and albums that are classified in the R&B genre in the United Kingdom. The chart is compiled by the Official Charts Company, and is based on sales of CDs, downloads, vinyl and other formats over the previous seven days.

The following are the number-one albums of 2005.

== Number-one albums ==
Issue date	Album	Artist(s)	Record label	Ref.
2 January	Encore	Eminem	Shady/Aftermath/Interscope	
9 January	Encore	Eminem	Shady/Aftermath/Interscope	
16 January	Encore	Eminem	Shady/Aftermath/Interscope	
23 January	R&B Anthems 2005	Various Artists	BMG TV/Sony TV	
30 January	The Documentary	The Game	G-Unit/Aftermath/Interscope	
6 February	Awfully Deep	Roots Manuva	Big Dada	
13 February	Mind Body & Soul	Joss Stone	Relentless/Virgin	
20 February	Mind Body & Soul	Joss Stone	Relentless/Virgin	
27 February	Suit	Nelly	Universal/Derrty/Fo' Reel	
6 March	Rebirth	Jennifer Lopez	Epic	
13 March	The Massacre	50 Cent	Shady/Aftermath/Interscope	
20 March	The Massacre	50 Cent	Shady/Aftermath/Interscope	
27 March	The Massacre	50 Cent	Shady/Aftermath/Interscope	
3 April	The Massacre	50 Cent	Shady/Aftermath/Interscope	
10 April	Trouble	Akon	UpFront/SRC/Universal	
17 April	The Singles	Basement Jaxx	XL	
24 April	The Singles	Basement Jaxx	XL	
4 September	Late Registration	Kanye West	Roc-A-Fella/Def Jam	
11 September	Late Registration	Kanye West	Roc-A-Fella/Def Jam	
18 September	Late Registration	Kanye West	Roc-A-Fella/Def Jam	
25 September	Late Registration	Kanye West	Roc-A-Fella/Def Jam	
2 October	Late Registration	Kanye West	Roc-A-Fella/Def Jam	
9 October	Late Registration	Kanye West	Roc-A-Fella/Def Jam	
16 October	Late Registration	Kanye West	Roc-A-Fella/Def Jam	
23 October	Greatest Hits	Mariah Carey	Columbia/Virgin	
30 October	#1's	Destiny's Child	Columbia/Music World	
6 November	Greatest Hits	Mariah Carey	Columbia/Virgin	
13 November	Get Rich or Die Tryin'	Various Artists	G-Unit/Interscope	
20 November	Greatest Hits	Mariah Carey	Columbia/Virgin	
27 November	Greatest Hits	Mariah Carey	Columbia/Virgin	
4 December	Curtain Call: The Hits	Eminem	Shady/Aftermath/Interscope	
11 December	Curtain Call: The Hits	Eminem	Shady/Aftermath/Interscope	
18 December	Curtain Call: The Hits	Eminem	Shady/Aftermath/Interscope	
25 December	Curtain Call: The Hits	Eminem	Shady/Aftermath/Interscope	

== See also ==
- List of UK Albums Chart number ones of the 2010s
