= All My Friends Are Here =

Studio album by Arif Mardin
- Released: 2010
- Recorded: 2005–2006
- Studios: Right Track Recording, New York
- Label: NuNoise
- Producers: Arif Mardin, Joe Mardin

Arif Mardin chronology
Journey (1975)	All My Friends Are Here (2010)

All My Friends Are Here is a studio album by Turkish-American record producer, arranger, and composer Arif Mardin, released on June 15, 2010. It is the album that Arif Mardin referred to as his life's work, featuring performances by artists whom he produced over the years of his career, including Bette Midler, Chaka Khan, David Sanborn, Norah Jones, Carly Simon, Phil Collins among them.

Whereas Arif Mardin's first two albums were instrumental, All My Friends Are Here is an album of his songs. Arif Mardin was a film buff and wrote collages for each song. In the trailer for The Greatest Ears in Town: The Arif Mardin Story, Arif Mardin said the songs were visual, film music in his mind.

Recording sessions of All My Friends Are Here were filmed for the companion documentary The Greatest Ears in Town: The Arif Mardin Story.

== Recording ==
Recording sessions took place in New York from 2005 to 2006, starting with "So Blue". In producing Chaka Khan's vocal, Khan said "He showed me what it was really like to sing jazz."

== Soundtrack ==
No.	Title	Writer(s)	Artist	Length
1.	"The Greatest Ears in Town"	Bette Midler, Marc Shaiman	Arif Mardin feat. Bette Midler & Barry Gibb	4:40
2.	"So Blue"	Arif Mardin, Roxanne Seeman	Arif Mardin feat. Chaka Khan & David Sanborn	4:58
3.	"No Way Out"	Arif Mardin	Arif Mardin feat. Nicki Parrott	5:31
4.	"Goodbye to Rio"	Arif Mardin	Arif Mardin feat. Raul Midon	4:15
5.	"No One"	Margo Guryan, Arif Mardin	Arif Mardin feat. Dianne Reeves	3:21
6.	"So Many Nights"	Arif Mardin	Arif Mardin feat. Danny O'Keefe	4:13
7.	"Calls a Soft Voice"	Arif Mardin	Arif Mardin feat. Carly Simon	5:41
8.	"Longing for You"	Arif Mardin, Michael Margulies	Arif Mardin feat. Norah Jones	6:49
9.	"Dual Blues"	Arif Mardin	Arif Mardin feat. Amy Kohn	5:31
10.	"Chez Twang’s"	Arif Mardin	Arif Mardin feat. Dr. John	5:38
11.	"Willie’s After Hours (Lone Star Blues)"	Arif Mardin	Arif Mardin feat. Willie Nelson & Katreese Barnes	5:58
12.	"All My Friends Are Here"	Arif Mardin	Arif Mardin feat. Members of the Average White Band, The Bee Gees and the Rascals, Phil Collins, Hall & Oates, Lalah Hathaway, Boy Meets Girl & Randy Brecker	4:32
13.	"Wistful"	Arif Mardin	Arif Mardin	1:25

== Personnel ==
Adapted from Allmusicin addition to featured artists shown above.

Arranging / Production

- Arif Mardin - Arranger, Composer, Conductor, Fender Rhodes, Horn Arrangements, Horn Conductor, Lyricist, Piano, Primary Artist, Producer, Quotation Author, Soloist, String Arrangements, String Conductor, Background Vocals
- Joe Mardin - Arranger, Art Direction, Bass (Vocal), Choir/Chorus, Conductor, Drums, Engineer, Finger Snaps, Gong, Horn Conductor, Mixing, Percussion, String Conductor, Vocal Harmony, Background Vocals, Voices
- Jeremy Morrison - Production Manager
- Michael O'Reilly - Associate Producer, Choir/Chorus, Engineer, Horn Engineer, Mixing, Vocal Engineer
- Rob Schwimmer - Arranger, Hammond B3, Piano, Stylophone, Theremin, Background Vocals, Voices, Choir/Chorus
- Steve Skinner - Arranger, Engineer, Fender Rhodes, Hammond B3, Keyboards, Programming
- Mark Stewart - Arranger, Background Vocals, Voices

Woodwinds

- Victor Goines - Clarinet
- Jerry Dodgion - Flute
- Aaron Heick - Oboe, Saxophone
- Diane Lesser - Oboe
- Marc Goldberg - Bassoon
- Dave Mann - Alto Sax, Soloist
- Andy Snitzer - Alto Sax
- David "Fathead" Newman - Tenor Sax
- Rich Perry - Tenor Sax
- Charlie Pillow - Tenor Sax
- Ronnie Cuber - Baritone Sax
- Roger Rosenberg - Bass Clarinet, Baritone Sax

Brass

- Barry Danielian - Trumpet
- Jon Faddis - Trumpet
- Jim Hynes - Trumpet
- Tony Kadleck - Trumpet
- Michael Leonhart - Trumpet
- Lew Soloff - Trumpet (soloist)
- Larry Farrel - Trombone
- John Fedchock - Trombone
- Birch Johnson - Trombone
- Keith O'Quinn - Trombone
- George Flynn - Bass Trombone
- Bob Carlisle - French Horn
- Phil Myers - French Horn
- Howard Johnson - Tuba

Keyboards

- Gil Goldstein - Accordion
- Jeff Gutcheon - Hammond Organ
- Robbie Kondor - Clavinet, Piano, Choir/Chorus,
- Spooner Oldham - Wurlitzer

Guitar / Bass

- Steve Burgh - Electric Guitar
- Reggie Griffin - Guitar
- Onnie McIntyre - Guitar, Choir/Chorus
- Doug Sahm - Electric Guitar, Soloist
- Ira Siegel - Guitar (Rhythm)
- David Spinozza - Guitar, Choir/Chorus
- Hamish Stuart - Guitar, Vocal Ad-Libs, Choir/Chorus
- Jimmy Day - Pedal Steel Guitar
- David Bromberg - Dobro
- Jerry Barnes - Bass, Choir/Chorus
- Alan Gorrie - Bass, Choir/Chorus
- Will Lee - Bass, Choir/Chorus
- Dan Spears - Bass
- Tom Barney - Acoustic Bass
- Nilson Matta - Acoustic Bass
- Ben Street - Acoustic Bass

Drums / Percussion

- Cyro Baptista - Drums, Percussion
- Billy Drummond - Drums
- Paul English - Drums
- Steve Ferrone - Drums
- Dennis Mackrel - Drums
- Ben Perowsky - Drums
- Herlin Riley - Drums, Washboard
- Sammy Figueroa - Congas, Choir/Chorus
- Ralph McDonald - Shaker
- Erik Charlston - Vibraphone
- Gordon Gottlieb - Vibraphone
- Philippe Saisse- Vibraphone

Vocal Assistance

- Angela Cappelli - Background Vocals
- Rachele Cappelli - Background Vocals
- Margaret Dorn - Background Vocals, Choir/Chorus
- Melissa Fathman - Background Vocals, Voices
- Ula Hedwig - Background Vocals, Choir/Chorus
- Margie Joseph - Vocal Ad-Libs, Choir/Chorus
- John Oates - Vocal Ad-Libs, Choir/Chorus

Strings

- Carol Webb - Concert Master, Violin
- Elena Barere - Concert Master, Violin
- Abe Appleman - Violin
- Avril Brown - Violin
- Enrico DiCecco - Violin
- Narciso Figueroa - Violin
- Katherine Fong - Violin
- Hae-Young Ham - Violin
- Joyce Hammann - Violin
- Jean Ingraham - Violin
- Karen Karlsrud - Violin
- Ann Leathers - Violin
- Anne Lehmann - Violin
- Laura Mcginniss - Violin
- Jan Mullen - Violin
- Carol Pool - Violin
- Carol Webb Sortomme - Violin
- Ricky Sortomme - Violin
- Yuri Vodovoz - Violin
- Irene Breslaw - Viola
- Karen Dreyfus - Viola
- Desiree Elsevier - Viola
- Vincent Lionti - Viola
- Craig Mumm - Viola
- Maxine Roach - Viola
- Jeanne LeBlanc - Cello
- Richard Locker - Cello
- Eugene Moye - Cello
- Jeremy Turner - Cello
- Kenny Kosek - Fiddle

Choir

- Sharod Barnes - Choir/Chorus
- David Brigati - Choir/Chorus
- Eddie Brigati - Choir/Chorus
- Felix Cavaliere - Choir/Chorus
- Robbi Komalo - Choir Conductor, Background Vocals
- George Merrill - Choir/Chorus
- Shannon Rubicam - Choir/Chorus
- Bobby Valli - Choir/Chorus

Children’s Chorus

- Emma Borrie - Children's Chorus
- Leah Borrie - Children's Chorus
- Dylan Donadio - Children's Chorus
- Ayla von Essen - Children's Chorus
- Indu von Essen - Children's Chorus
- Giovanni von Essen - Children's Chorus
- [ulia Heim - Children's Chorus
- Mbali Kumolo - Children's Chorus
- Didi Kumalo - Children's Chorus
- Gabe Nekrutman - Children's Chorus
- Lindsey Williams - Children's Chorus

Engineering

- Savvas Iossifidis - Engineer
- John Merchant - Engineer
- [immy Nutt - Engineer
- Gene Paul - Engineer
- Dale Ramsey - Engineer
- Jamie Rosenberg - Engineer
- Dean Sharnow - Engineer
- Gary Shelton - Engineer
- Tom Alezza - Assistant Engineer
- Peter Doris - Assistant Engineer
- Justin Gerrish - Assistant Engineer
- [osé González - Assistant Engineer
- Yohei Gotoh - Assistant Engineer
- [hris Jennings - Assistant Engineer
- [ick Kwan - Assistant Engineer
- Ben Liscio - Assistant Engineer
- Patrick Magee - Assistant Engineer
- Andy Manganello - Assistant Engineer
- Brian Montgomery - Assistant Engineer
- Joey P. - Assistant Engineer
- Chris Soper - Assistant Engineer
- Reed Taylor - Assistant Engineer
- Alex Venguer - Assistant Engineer
- Tim Whitney - Assistant Engineer
- Sheldon Yellowhair - Assistant Engineer
- Ted Jensen - Mastering
