= Shannon Rubicam =

American singer-songwriter

- Born: October 11, 1951 (age 75); Seattle, Washington, U.S.
- Genre: Pop
- Occupation: Singer-songwriter
- Years active: 1974–present
- Member of: Boy Meets Girl

Shannon Rubicam (born October 11, 1951) is an American singer and songwriter whose songs have been recorded by Whitney Houston, Bette Midler, Dolly Parton and Smokey Robinson, among others. She co-wrote "How Will I Know" which was a hit for Whitney Houston in 1986, as well as Houston's 1987 hit "I Wanna Dance With Somebody (Who Loves Me)".

From the mid 1980s to the present day, Rubicam and her writing partner, George Merrill, have been the vocal duo Boy Meets Girl, who are best remembered for their 1988 hit "Waiting for a Star to Fall". They wrote the song and had initially offered it to Houston and Belinda Carlisle but both rejected it (though Carlisle did do a demo recording) and Boy Meets Girl decided to feature it on the next Boy Meets Girl album titled Reel Life.

Rubicam and Merrill were married in the mid 1980s until they divorced in 2000. Despite the divorce they have continued working together as Boy Meets Girl, and other music endeavors.

Rubicam and Merrill have a daughter, Hilary Rubicam Merrill. Hilary can be seen as the girl chasing the bubble in her parents' video for "Waiting for a Star to Fall".

Songwriting for other artists continued through the years including the OTT single "The Story Of Love" which reached #11 on the Official Charts from their album This One's for You.

Boy Meets Girl released the band's fifth album project, entitled 5, in 2021 and soon after, the accompanying Five (Deluxe Version) released in 2022. In 2024, came the singles "Falling Hard (Loko Velocet Remix)", "The Wonderground" by Hopkinson & Boy Meets Girl, and "We The People". In 2026, they began the release of a string of songs as part of an unnamed new music project.

Rubicam along with her writing partner, Merrill, were included in the 2027 class of nominees for the Songwriters Hall of Fame.

== Discography ==
=== Albums and EPs ===
Year	Album	Record Label	Chart positions	
Year	Album	Record Label	US	UK
1985	Boy Meets Girl	A&M Records (Universal)	76	—
1988	Reel Life	RCA/BMG (Sony)	50	74
1990	New Dream	RCA/BMG (Sony)	—	—
2003	The Wonderground	Boy Meets Girl Music	—	—
2021	Five (EP)	Boy Meets Girl Music	—	—
2022	Five (Deluxe Edition)	Boy Meets Girl Music	—	—

=== Singles ===
Year	Song	Peak chart positions				Certifications	Album
Year	Song	US	US AC	AUS	UK	Certifications	Album
1985	"Oh Girl"	39	—	—	—		Boy Meets Girl
1985	"The Touch"	—	—	—	—		Boy Meets Girl
1986	"Heartbreaker"	—	—	—	—		Single
1988	"Waiting for a Star to Fall"	5	1	35	9	BPI: Gold	Reel Life
1989	"Bring Down the Moon"	49	28	—	92		Reel Life
1989	"Stormy Love"	—	—	—	—		Reel Life
1991	"Waiting for a Star to Fall" (re-issue)	—	—	—	76		Reel Life
2021	"More Deeply (In Love With You)" [5]	—	—	—	—		Five
2021	"Falling Hard" [6]	—	—	—	—		Five
2021	"Gone"	—	—	—	—		Five
2022	"Stars Are Falling"	—	—	—	—		Five
2022	"How Will I Know (Martini Mix)"	—	—	—	—		Five (Deluxe Edition)
2024	"We The People" [7]	—	—	—	—		Single
2025	For a Star to Fall (with Bingo Players and Disco Fries)	—	—	—	—		Single
2026	Elemental	—	—	—	—		Single

=== Songwriting Credits ===
Year	Song	Artist	Release
1983	"Falling Star"	Phyllis Hyman	Goddess of Love
1983	"Your Move My Heart"	Phyllis Hyman	Goddess of Love
1984	"Haunting Me"	Deniece Williams	Let's Hear It for the Boy
1984	"Don't Tell Me We Have Nothing"	Deniece Williams	Let's Hear it for the Boy
1985	"How Will I Know"	Whitney Houston	Whitney Houston
1987	"Love Finds You"	Deniece Williams	Love Finds You
1987	"I Know You By Heart"	Dolly Parton & Smokey Robinson	Rainbow
1987	"I Wanna Dance With Somebody (Who Loves Me)	Whitney Houston	Whitney
1987	"Simply Meant to Be"	Gary Morris & Jennifer Warnes	Blind Date Soundtrack
1988	"Best Intentions"	Russell Hitchcock	Russell Hitchcock
1988	"I Know You By Heart"	Bette Midler & David Pack	Beaches
1989	"When The Lights Go Down Low"	Herb Alpert	When The Lights Go Down Low [8]
1993	"Bring Me Home"	Paul Young	The Crossing
1996	"Knee Deep"	Kermit the Frog	The Muppets at Walt Disney World
1997	"The Day I Get Over You"	Edyta Gorniak	Edyta Gorniak
1997	"The Story Of Love"	OTT	This One's For You
2000	"We See It Differently"	Sister2Sister	One
2004	"Take Me To The Clouds Above"	LMC	Take Me To The Clouds Above
2005	"In My Arms	Mylo	In My Arms
2005	"Star2Fall"	Cabin Crew	Star2Fall
2005	"Falling Stars"	Sunset Strippers	Falling Stars
2006	"Dance!"	Fatman Scoop, Lumidee, Goleo	FIFA World Cup 2006 soundtrack
2009	"Girls Just Wanna Dance"	Royal Gigolos	Girls Just Wanna Dance
2015	"How Will I Know"	Sam Smith	The Lonely Hour (Drowning Shadows Edition)
2015	"Somebody"	Natalie La Rose, Jeremih	Somebody
2018	"In The Middle"	Em Rossi	In The Middle
2021	"If You Really Love Me (How Will I Know)"	David Guetta, MistaJam, John Newman	If You Really Love Me (How Will I Know)
2021	"Dance with You"	Laura Marano & Grey	Us
2022	"YAH Know"	Chance The Rapper	YAH Know
2024	"The Wonderground"	Hopkinson & Boy Meets Girl	The Wonderground
2024	"Don't Wanna Dance"	Thomas Rhett	About A Woman
2025	"You Wanna Cry"	IVE	IVE EMPATHY
