= Reel Life (Boy Meets Girl album) =

Studio album by Boy Meets Girl
- Released: November 18, 1988
- Recorded: 1987−88
- Genre: Pop
- Length: 45:05
- Label: RCA/BMG
- Producer: Arif Mardin (tracks 1–4); George Merrill (tracks 5–10)

Boy Meets Girl chronology
| Boy Meets Girl (1985) | Reel Life (1988) | New Dream (1990) |

Professional ratings
Review scores
| Source | Rating |
|---|---|
| AllMusic | 3.5/5 stars |

Reel Life is the second album by American pop singer-songwriting duo Boy Meets Girl, released in 1988 by RCA Records/BMG. It features their biggest top 10 hit "Waiting for a Star to Fall".

Like the duo's previous album, all of the tracks were written entirely by George Merrill and Shannon Rubicam.

== Track listing ==
- All titles by Shannon Rubicam and George Merrill, except where noted; published by Irving Music, Inc./Boy Meets Girl Music.
1. "Bring Down the Moon" − 5:02
2. "Waiting for a Star to Fall" − 4:32
3. "Stormy Love" − 4:36
4. "Is Anybody Out There in Love?" − 4:55 (Merrill)
5. "Stay Forever" − 4:08
6. "If You Run" − 4:33
7. "One Sweet Dream" − 5:47
8. "No Apologies" − 4:25
9. "Restless Dreamer" − 4:56
10. "Someone's Got to Send Out Love" − 1:56

== Production ==
- Paul Atkinson – A&R
- Arif Mardin – producer (1–4)
- George Merrill – producer (5–10)
- Joey Wolpert – recording, mixing (5, 7, 10)
- Rod Hui – additional recording
- Jim Bredouw – assistant engineer
- Don Tittle – assistant engineer
- Matt Tritto – assistant engineer
- Eric Westfall – assistant engineer
- David Leonard – mixing (1–4, 6, 8, 9)
- Jim Dineen – mix assistant (1–4, 6, 8, 9)
- Kristen Connelly – mix assistant (5, 7, 10)
- Stephen Marcussen – mastering at Precision Lacquer (Hollywood, California)
- Ria Lewerke – creative director
- Norman Moore – art direction, design
- Michael Tighe – photography
- Direct Managerment Group – management

== Personnel ==
=== Boy Meets Girl ===
- Shannon Rubicam – vocals
- George Merrill – vocals, acoustic piano (1, 2, 10), synthesizers (1–3, 5, 7), E-mu Emax (1, 7, 8), bass (2), drum programming (2, 3, 7, 8), sequencing (3, 6, 8), drum sequencing (4), Emax voices (4), Linn 9000 drum machine (5), sampler (5), digital piano (6, 9), E-mu Emulator (10)

=== Additional musicians ===
- Joe Mardin – synthesizers (1, 2, 4), additional programming (3)
- Richard Gibbs – synthesizers (4, 5, 9), sampler (5), voice box solo (6), sound effects (6), rear whistle (9)
- Thomas Hart – programming (10)
- John Goux – guitars (1, 2, 4, 5, 7, 8), Ebow (1), electric guitar (3), dulcimer (7)
- John Morton – guitars (6, 9)
- Eric Williams – mandolin (9)
- Leon Gaer – bass (1, 4, 10)
- Kerry Hatch – synth bass (3), bass (5, 7–9)
- Kevin McCormick – bass (6)
- Michael Jochum – drums (1–3, 6, 8, 9), Linn 9000 drum machine (5), bongos (7), brushes (7), cymbal (7)
- Denny Fongheiser – Linn 9000 drum machine (1), drums (2–4)
- Andy Snitzer – alto saxophone (2), oboe (8)
- Larry Williams – alto saxophone (8)
- Susan Boyd – additional vocals (2, 3, 5)
- Joe Turano – additional vocals (6)
- Bunman – Bunman (10)

== Charts ==
=== Weekly charts ===
| Chart (1989) | Peak position |
|---|---|
| UK Albums Chart | 74 |
| US Billboard 200 | 50 |
