= Boy Meets Girl (Boy Meets Girl album) =

Studio album by Boy Meets Girl
- Released: April 15, 1985
- Genre: Pop
- Length: 41:11
- Label: A&M
- Producer: Tom Werman

Boy Meets Girl chronology
Boy Meets Girl (1985)	Reel Life (1988)

Professional ratings
Review scores
Source	Rating
AllMusic	3.5/5 stars

Boy Meets Girl is the self-titled debut album by American pop singer-songwriters George Merrill and Shannon Rubicam, also known as Boy Meets Girl. It was released on A&M Records in 1985, and was their only disc for the label. The album included the single "Oh Girl" peaked at No. 39, becoming the band's first top 40 hit on the Billboard pop chart.

The album was written by Rubicam and Merrill, with one outside writer receiving co-credit on one track. The music is much different from their later work as it has a more prominent hard rock influence. Merrill and Rubicam would go on to pen hits for Whitney Houston and get a contract with RCA Records, which would release their second full-length album, Reel Life, three years later. That record would provide them with their sole top-ten hit as a recording act, "Waiting for a Star to Fall."

== Track listing ==
- All songs written by Shannon Rubicam and George Merrill (Irving Music/Boy Meets Girl Music), except where noted.
1. "Oh Girl" - 4:18
2. "Don't Tell Me We Have Nothing" - 4:01
3. "The Touch" (Rubicam, Merrill, T. Bell; Irving Music/Boy Meets Girl Music/BellBoy Music) - 3:55
4. "Kissing, Falling, Flying" - 3:34
5. "From Now On" - 4:49
6. "Be My Baby" - 3:47
7. "In Your Eyes" - 4:09
8. "I Wish You Were Here" - 3:37
9. "Pieces" - 4:09
10. "Premonitions" - 4:47

== Personnel ==
=== Boy Meets Girl ===
- Shannon Rubicam – lead and backing vocals
- George Merrill – lead and backing vocals, MIDI piano, Roland Jupiter-8, Yamaha DX7, Oberheim DMX programming

=== Additional musicians ===
- Richard Gibbs – E-mu Emulator, vocoder
- John Goux – lead guitar (1), guitar (1, 4, 9)
- Scott Shelly – guitar (1, 5, 7)
- John Morton – guitar (2, 5, 9, 10)
- Paul Jackson, Jr. – guitar (3, 6, 8)
- Eric Williams – guitar (4)
- Leon Gaer – bass (1–6, 8, 9, 10)
- Kyle Henderson – bass (7), backing vocals (8)
- Michael Jochum – Simmons Drums
- Steve Forman – percussion
- Tom Werman – percussion
- Gary Herbig – tenor saxophone (6)
- George Hawkins – backing vocals (2, 10)
- Thom Bell – backing vocals (3, 6)
- Jon Joyce – backing vocals (4, 7)
- John Batdorf – backing vocals (7)
- Susan Boyd – backing vocals (9)

== Production ==
- Tom Werman – producer
- Gary Ladinsky – recording, mixing
- Matt Brady – recording assistant
- George Marino – mastering
- Richard Frankel – art direction
- Michael Hodgson – art direction, design
- Norman Seeff – photography

Studios

- Recorded at Record Plant and Sounder Studios (Los Angeles, California).
- Mastered at Sterling Sound (New York City, New York).
