= The Greatest Ears in Town: The Arif Mardin Story =

The Greatest Ears In Town: The Arif Mardin Story
- Directed by: Doug Biro
- Produced by: Joe Mardin
- Release date: June 15, 2010
- Running time: 100 minutes
- Country: United States
- Language: English

The Greatest Ears in Town: The Arif Mardin Story is a 2010 documentary about the Grammy winning music producer Arif Mardin. The documentary was produced by his son Joe Mardin and was directed by Doug Biro. It was made in the years prior to Arif's death in 2006 from pancreatic cancer.

== Synopsis ==
The documentary goes behind the scenes in the recording studio with Arif Mardin. It shows him working with artists such as Norah Jones and Jewel. The documentary also features artists such as Aretha Franklin and producers such as George Martin reflecting on his life and career. It also explores his personality and humorous nature.

== Release ==
For Arif Mardin's All My Friends Are Here album and The Greatest Ears in Town: The Arif Mardin Story companion documentary released in 2010, Seeman wrote lyrics for Mardin's composition So Blue.^{[116]} featuring Chaka Khan and David Sanborn.The documentary was released on June 15, 2010. Upon its release, it was screened at several chapters of the Recording Academy. It was first screened in New York City on the day of its release. After its premiere screening, a discussion about Arif Mardin followed. It was hosted by the Recording Academy's Producers and Engineers Wing. The discussion was moderated by Joe Mardin and panelists included Phil Ramone, Russ Titelman, Doug Biro, Jimmy Douglass, Michael O'Reilly and Frank Filipetti. It later premiered at the Grammy Museum in Los Angeles, which featured a panel discussion with Quincy Jones and Chaka Khan. It also premiered in Miami, which featured a panel discussion with Barry Gibb.

== Soundtrack ==
The Greatest Ears in Town: The Arif Mardin Story filmed the making of Arif Mardin's All My Friends Are Here album, documenting his life's work.

No.	Title	Writer(s)	Artist	Length
1.	"The Greatest Ears in Town"	Bette Midler, Marc Shaiman	Arif Mardin feat. Bette Midler & Barry Gibb	4:40
2.	"So Blue"	Arif Mardin, Roxanne Seeman	Arif Mardin feat. Chaka Khan & David Sanborn	4:58
3.	"No Way Out"	Arif Mardin	Arif Mardin feat. Nicki Parrot	5:31
4.	"Goodbye to Rio"	Arif Mardin	Arif Mardin feat. Raul Midon	4:15
5.	"No One"	Margo Guryan, Arif Mardin	Arif Mardin feat. Dianne Reeves	3:21
6.	"So Many Nights"	Arif Mardin	Arif Mardin feat. Danny O'Keefe	4:13
7.	"Calls a Soft Voice"	Arif Mardin	Arif Mardin feat. Carly Simon	5:41
8.	"Longing for You"	Arif Mardin, Michael Margulies	Arif Mardin feat. Norah Jones	6:49
9.	"Dual Blues"	Arif Mardin	Arif Mardin feat. Amy Kohn	5:31
10.	"Chez Twang’s"	Arif Mardin	Arif Mardin feat. Dr. John	5:38
11.	"Willie’s After Hours (Lone Star Blues)"	Arif Mardin	Arif Mardin feat. Willie Nelson & Katreese Barnes	5:58
12.	"All My Friends Are Here"	Arif Mardin	Arif Mardin feat. Members of the Average White Band, The Bee Gees and the Rascals, Phil Collins, Hall&Oates, Lalah Hathaway, Boy Meets Girl & Randy Brecker	4:32
13.	"Wistful"	Arif Mardin	Arif Mardin	1:25

== Reception ==
Randy Lewis of the LA Times wrote: "Mardin “was more responsible than he has ever been given credit for many of the successes that we’ve had,” Ertegun himself says in The Greatest Ears in Town: The Arif Mardin Story, an illuminating documentary filled with as much humor as pathos that received its first L.A. screening Monday night at the Grammy Museum as part of the facility's "Reel to Reel" film series."

Howard Dukes of Soultracks wrote: "By pursuing his American Dream, Mardin made the dreams come true for scores of great artists by creating music that became part of our musical soundtrack. This loving documentary reminds us not only of the scope of Mardin’s accomplishments, but also of the indelible mark he has left on the lives of music lovers of the past half century. It is a fitting tribute to a musical giant."

Wesley Britton of blogcritics.org wrote: "The Greatest Ears in Town should certainly appeal to any participant in the music business whether as a recording artist, producer, or composer. Further, anyone interested in the history of modern popular music from jazz to pop to R&B to rock should be aware of the work of Arif Mardin, as he personified many of the changing trends from the mid-’60s until the early years of the 21st century. If you want the insider’s perspective, well, actually many insider perspectives, The Greatest Ears in Town is as enjoyable a music lesson as anyone can expect."
