= Somethin' 'Bout a Woman =

2024 single by Thomas Rhett

Single by Thomas Rhett featuring Teddy Swims

from the album About a Woman (Deluxe Edition)
- Released: November 15, 2024
- Genre: Country
- Length: 3:30
- Label: Valory
- Songwriters: Thomas Rhett; Julian Bunetta; Andrew Haas; John Ryan
- Producers: Bunetta; Dann Huff

Thomas Rhett singles chronology
"After All the Bars Are Closed" (2024)	"Somethin' 'Bout a Woman" (2024)

Teddy Swims singles chronology
"Bad Dreams" (2024)	"Somethin' 'Bout a Woman (Remix)" (2024)	"Georgia Ways" (2024)

"Somethin' 'Bout a Woman" is a song by American country music singer Thomas Rhett from his seventh studio album, About a Woman (2024). It was written by Rhett, Julian Bunetta, Andrew Haas and John Ryan, and produced by Bunetta and Dann Huff. An official remix of the song featuring American singer Teddy Swims was released on November 15, 2024, and is included on the deluxe version of the album (2025).

== Composition ==
The song contains electric guitar and undulating bass and has a soul-leaning atmosphere. It revolves around Thomas Rhett being charmed by his wife Lauren Akins, underlying that his feeling of affection is not encouraged by the romantic moonlight, music from a band or wine, but her only. Rhett describes he was not interested in marrying until he met her, before adding how his love has affected his sleep and she has pushed him to achieve things he never thought he could.

== Live performances ==
Thomas Rhett and Teddy Swims performed the song at the 58th Annual Country Music Association Awards on November 20, 2024.

== Charts ==
=== Weekly charts ===
Weekly chart performance for "Somethin' 'Bout a Woman"
Chart (2024–2025)	Peak position
Canada Hot 100 (Billboard)	95
Croatia International Airplay (Top lista)	48
New Zealand Hot Singles (RMNZ)	16
North Macedonia Airplay (Radiomonitor)	1
Romania Airplay (TopHit)	46
US Billboard Hot 100	65
US Hot Country Songs (Billboard)	17

=== Year-end charts ===
Year-end chart performance for "Somethin' 'Bout a Woman"
Chart (2025)	Position
Romania Airplay (TopHit)	110
US Hot Country Songs (Billboard)	49

== Certifications ==
Region	Certification	Certified units/sales
Brazil (Pro-Música Brasil)	Gold	20,000^{‡}
Canada (Music Canada)	Gold	40,000^{‡}
United States (RIAA)	Platinum	1,000,000^{‡}
^{‡} Sales+streaming figures based on certification alone.
