= Michael Jochum =

American rock/jazz/nu metal drummer

- Genres: Nu metal, alternative metal, industrial metal, acoustic, Pop rock, Synth rock, Jazz, Jazz rock, Jazz fusion, soul, R&B
- Instrument(s): Drums, percussion
- Labels: EMI/Virgin Records
- Website: www.korn.com

Michael Jochum is an American rock/jazz/nu metal drummer. Although a session musician early in his career, he gained more recognition as a touring member of the band Korn.

He started as a musician in the late 1970s as a member of the jazz rock/jazz fusion band, Kittyhawk. He also began performing on sessions for the likes of jazz musician David Pritchard, Ronnie Laws, Bobby Bland, and DeBarge. By the mid-1980s, he was playing alongside then-former Oingo Boingo members Richard Gibbs and Kerry Hatch in the band Zuma II, which had an eponymously titled record released by Pasha/CBS Records. One of his first major contributions as a session musician was as the sole drummer on the self-titled debut album from songwriting/recording duo Boy Meets Girl. He later appeared on the majority of the tracks on the group's follow-up album, Reel Life, including their most successful single, "Waiting for a Star to Fall," on which he is featured as one of two drummers. He also played drums in Jackson Browne's World in Motion and toured with him for over four years.

He is mostly known for his work as part of Korn's backing band. He played 2nd percussion and donned a pig mask during the See You on the Other Side and Family Values 2006 tours, as well as their MTV: Unplugged performance. During the MTV: Unplugged, Jochum was the lead drummer, since David Silveria was then on hiatus.

Jochum left the back-up band shortly after Korn's 2007 European Tour, due to setlist changes that did not involve Jochum's drumming.

Jochum returned to the Korn world in November 2007 following Joey Jordison's return to Slipknot. He was also a member of Jonathan Davis' acoustic solo tour band. He was back out of the band in 2008, replaced by Ray Luzier for Korn's early 2008 European tour.
