= Bring Down the Moon =

Single by Boy Meets Girl

from the album Reel Life
- A-side: "Bring Down the Moon"
- Released: 1989
- Genre: Pop
- Songwriter(s): George Merrill, Shannon Rubicam
- Producer(s): Arif Mardin

Boy Meets Girl singles chronology
"Waiting for a Star to Fall" (1988)	"Bring Down the Moon" (1989)	"Stormy Love" (1989)

"Bring Down the Moon" is a song written and performed by American duo Boy Meets Girl and released as a single from the album Reel Life. It reached #49 on the Billboard Hot 100 and #92 on the UK Singles Chart.

== Music video ==
The music video was directed by Alex Proyas.

== Charts ==
Chart (1989)	Peak Position
UK Singles (Official Charts Company)	92
US (Billboard Hot 100)	49

== Credits ==
- Shannon Rubicam – lead vocals, backing vocals
- George Merrill – lead vocals, acoustic piano, synthesizers, E-mu Emax
- Joe Mardin – synthesizers
- John Goux – guitars, EBow
- Leon Gaer – bass
- Denny Fongheiser – Linn 9000 drum machine
- Michael Jochum – drum overdubs
