= Gone Country (disambiguation) =

Gone Country is a 1994 song by Alan Jackson.

Gone Country may also refer to:

- Gone Country (TV series), a 2008–2009 reality series on Country Music Television
- "Gone Country", a 2024 song by Thomas Rhett from About a Woman
