= In doma =

Studio album by Debora Petrina
- Released: 2009
- Genre: Pop
- Length: 47:03
- Language: Italian, English
- Producer: Debora Petrina

Debora Petrina chronology
In doma (2009)	Petrina (2013)

In doma
Review scores
Source	Rating
All About Jazz	3.5/5 stars

In doma is the 2009 debut album by Debora Petrina, who composed, arranged, mixed, and produced it in addition to providing vocals, accordion, piano, and keyboards. It was released by A Buzz Supreme-Consorzio Utopia and distributed by Egea. Guests on this album include Elliott Sharp, Amy Kohn and Ascanio Celestini. JAM Magazine voted it as the best debut album in November 2009, and it won the Indie-pop Revelation Prize at MEI's 2009 indie label festival.

In doma was covered by magazines other print including Blow Up, All About Jazz, Il Mucchio, JAM Magazine, Rockerilla, Rumore, Il Manifesto, and Stile. Petrina has also appeared on radio shows such as Battiti and Terzo anello on Rai Radio 3; Demo on Rai Radio 1; and TG2 Mizar on TG2, as well as independent stations such as Radio Popolare, LifeGate Radio, Radio Capodistria, and Radio Città Futura. Songs from In doma were included on David Byrne's radio show on his monthly playlist three separate times in 2009.

== Track listing ==
No.	Title	Length
1.	"Babel Bee"	1:30
2.	"A ce soir"	3:47
3.	"She-Shoe"	4:35
4.	"Fuori Stagione"	5:52
5.	"SMS (Csókolózás lány)"	3:58
6.	"Notte usata"	4:14
7.	"Pool Story"	6:13
8.	"Ghost Track"	5:35
9.	"Asteròide 482"	4:03
10.	"Sounds-Like"	7:12

== Personnel ==
- Debora Petrina - vocals, accordion, piano, Rhodes piano, keyboard, toy piano production, composer, arranger
- Alessandro Fedrigo - acoustic bass, electric bass, vocals
- Gianni Bertoncini - drums, stylophone, vocals
- Emir Bijukic - Kraakdoos in "SMS (Csókolózás lány" and "Pool Story"
- Elliott Sharp - guitar in "Pool Story"
- Amy Kohn - accordion in "Ghost Track"
- Ascanio Celestini - radio announcement in "Asteròide 482"
- Patrizia Laquidara - co-writer of "Fuori Stagione"
