= Beautiful as You (Thomas Rhett song) =

Single by Thomas Rhett

from the album About a Woman
- Released: May 13, 2024
- Genre: Country pop
- Length: 2:43
- Label: Valory
- Songwriters: Thomas Rhett; Rocky Block; Joshua Coleman; Alexander Izquiero; Jacob Kasher Hindlin; John Ryan; Zaire Kelsey
- Producers: Ammo; Julian Bunetta; John Ryan; Dann Huff

Thomas Rhett singles chronology
"Mamaw's House" (2023)	"Beautiful as You" (2024)	"After All the Bars Are Closed" (2025)

Lyric Video
- "Beautiful as You" on YouTube

"Beautiful as You" is a song by American country music singer Thomas Rhett. It was released on May 13, 2024, as the first single from his seventh studio album, About a Woman. The song was written by Rhett, Rocky Block, Joshua Coleman, Alexander Izquiero, Jacob Kasher Hindlin, John Ryan and Zaire Kelsey, and produced by Coleman, Julian Bunetta, Ryan and Dann Huff. The song reached #2 on the Country Airplay chart on the week ending November 30, 2024, behind "I Am Not Okay" by Jelly Roll.

== Background and content ==
Rhett discussed "Beautiful as You" in an interview with iHeartCountry:

"This is an anthem for everybody who feels like they out-kicked their coverage, there was one day a couple years back when I was looking at my wife, and I was like, 'Why in the world did you choose me?' I get to be with someone who could easily be on the cover of a magazine, and I get to see her in all her forms — a partner, a mother, a friend, even a philanthropist. I just feel like I've got a first row seat at almost-perfection, if you will. And like the song says, 'Seriously, what is somebody as amazing as you doing with somebody like me?' [...] So much of my music is a reflection of the stage of life we are in — we’re in a very joyful season — and this song is just the tip of the iceberg to the rest of this next album."

Rhett also noted that the reason for releasing this song as the first single was "just sort of reminded me of how I used to kind of start my records, sort of with a big swing, different sound, sonically different, melodically different, and a song that my kids just really, really enjoyed and danced to, so it seemed like the right first choice to us."

The song was inspired by Rhett's wife Lauren Akins, and is a self-deprecating song about dating someone more beautiful than you.

== Critical reception ==
Billy Dukes of website Taste of Country compared the song's pop style melody to Rhett's third studio album, Life Changes.

== Chart performance ==
"Beautiful as You" debuted at number one on the US Bubbling Under Hot 100 chart for the week of May 25, 2024. After a four week stay on the charts, it debuted at number 96 on the Billboard Hot 100.

This song topped the UK Country Airplay for three weeks.

== Track listing ==
Digital EP
1. "Beautiful as You" – 2:44
2. "Beautiful as U" – 2:43
3. "Beautiful as U" (Vavo Remix) – 2:17
4. "Beautiful as You" (Acoustic) – 2:43
5. "Beautiful as You" (Live from the 59th ACM Awards) – 2:53

== Personnel ==
Credits adapted from AllMusic.

- Thomas Rhett – vocals
- Ammo – drums, acoustic guitar, bass guitar, keyboards, percussion, producer, programming
- Dann Huff – acoustic guitar, Producer
- Jeff Gunnell – recording
- John Ryan – drums, acoustic guitar, bass guitar, keyboards, percussion, producer, programming, background vocals
- Julian Bunetta – drums, acoustic guitar, bass guitar, keyboards, percussion, producer, programming, recording
- Mike "Frog" Griffith – production coordination
- Zai1k – background vocals
- Alex Ghenea – mixing
- Harrison Tate – mastering engineer
- Nathan Dantzler – mastering engineer

== Charts ==
=== Weekly charts ===
Weekly chart performance for "Beautiful as You"
Chart (2024)	Peak position
Australia Country Hot 50 (The Music)	11
Canada Hot 100 (Billboard)	57
Canada Country (Billboard)	7
UK Country Airplay (Radiomonitor)	1
US Billboard Hot 100	50
US Country Airplay (Billboard)	2
US Hot Country Songs (Billboard)	10

=== Year-end charts ===
2024 year-end performance for "Beautiful as You"
Chart (2024)	Position
US Country Airplay (Billboard)	54
US Hot Country Songs (Billboard)	46

2025 year-end performance for "Beautiful as You"
Chart (2025)	Position
US Hot Country Songs (Billboard)	100

== Certifications ==
Certifications and sales for "Beautiful as You"
Region	Certification	Certified units/sales
Canada (Music Canada)	Platinum	80,000^{‡}
United States (RIAA)	Gold	500,000^{‡}
^{‡} Sales+streaming figures based on certification alone.
