= Annie F. Downs =

American author

- Born: 1980 (age 45–46)
- Education: University of Georgia, (B.Sc.Ed.)
- Occupations: Author; Podcaster; Public Speaker
- Years active: 2012–present
- Website: https://www.anniefdowns.com/

Annie F. Downs (born 1980) is an American author, public speaker, and podcaster based in Nashville, Tennessee. She is known for writing Christian daily devotionals and for her podcast, That Sounds Fun. Downs is also a practicing Christian.

== Early life and education ==
Downs received a Bachelor of Science in education from the University of Georgia in 2002.

== Career ==
Downs began her career as an elementary school teacher before pursuing a career in public speaking and writing. In 2012, one of her books was published by a publishing house for the first time. In 2014, Downs started her first podcast, That Sounds Fun. In 2020, Downs announced the launch of her own podcasting network, That Sounds Fun Podcast Network.

In May 2021, she co-hosted an eight-episode podcast with Lauren Akins titled Live in Love with Lauren Akins which was released on Downs' That Sounds Fun Podcast Network (TSFN). Season two of the podcast premiered in October 2021. Her latest podcast, Let's Read the Gospels premiered in January 2023. In October 2021, Downs published her first children's book, What Sounds Fun to You?

== Publications ==
=== Children ===
- What Sounds Fun to You? (October 19, 2021)
- 100 Days to Brave for Kids: Devotions for Overcoming Fear and Finding Your Courage (January 5, 2022)
- Where Did TJ Go? (February 18, 2025)

=== Young Adults ===
- Looking for Lovely: Collecting the Moments that Matter (May 1, 2016)
- A Life of Lovely: The Young Woman's Guide to Collecting the Moments That Matter (January 15, 2019)
- Perfectly Unique: Love Yourself Completely, Just As You Are (October 1, 2019)
- Speak Love: Your Words Can Change the World (April 7, 2020)

=== Adults ===
- From Head To Foot: All of you living all for Him (November 15, 2010)
- Perfectly Unique: Praising God from Head to Foot (September 4, 2012)
- Speak Love: Making Your Words Matter (August 20, 2013)
- Speak Love Revolution: 30 Devotions that Will Change Your World (September 18, 2013)
- Let's All Be Brave: Living Life with Everything You Have (July 15, 2014)
- Looking for Lovely: Collecting Moments that Matter (April 5, 2016)
- 100 Days to Brave: Devotions for Unlocking Your Most Courageous Self (October 24, 2017)
- Remember God (October 2, 2018)
- 100 Days to Brave Guided Journal: Unlock Your Most Courageous Self (May 12, 2020)
- That Sounds Fun: The Joys of Being an Amateur, the Power of Falling in Love, and Why You Need a Hobby (February 2, 2021)
- Chase the Fun: 100 Days to Discover Fun Right Where You Are (August 2, 2022)
- Let's Read the Gospels: A Guided Journal (March 5, 2024)
