= Andy Snitzer =

American saxophonist

- Genres: Pop, jazz
- Occupation: Musician
- Instrument: Saxophone
- Years active: 1988–present
- Website: www.andysnitzer.com

Andy Snitzer is an American saxophonist, composer, and arranger. He is known for his work as a session musician with numerous famous artists, including Paul Simon, Aretha Franklin, Martika, Sting, The Rolling Stones, and Chaka Khan.

== Early life and education ==
Snitzer was born and raised in Cheltenham, Pennsylvania outside of Philadelphia. He earned a degree in music at the University of Miami and an MBA from New York University.

== Career ==
After moving to New York City, Snitzer pursued a career as a session musician and composer. He provided the saxophone solo in Boy Meets Girl's 1988 hit "Waiting for a Star to Fall". Snitzer has released several albums as a solo artist, including Ties That Bind, In the Eye of the Storm, Some Quiet Place, and Traveler. His music is a blend of contemporary jazz, pop, and R&B. Ties That Bind received critical acclaim for its "sensuous melodies and rich harmonies" and was described as "one of the most enjoyable smooth jazz albums of the year" by JazzTimes. He has written music for television commercials and produced music for several artists. Snitzer won the Grammy for Best Contemporary Instrumental Album at the 60th Grammy Awards as part of the Jeff Lorber Fusion.
