= Russell Hitchcock (album) =

Studio album by Russell Hitchcock
- Released: 1988
- Recorded: 1987
- Genre: Soft rock
- Length: 40:31
- Label: Arista
- Producer: Mike Curb; Robbie Buchanan; Jimmy Ienner; Michael Lloyd; Keith Olsen

Russell Hitchcock chronology
| Russell Hitchcock (1988) | Take Time (2006) |

Singles from Russell Hitchcock
- 1. "The River Cried" Released: April 1987; 2. "Dreams Of The Lonely" Released: July 1987; 3. "Someone Who Believes In You" Released: February 1988; 4. "The Sun Ain't Gonna Shine (Anymore)" Released: May 1988

Russell Hitchcock is the debut solo album by Russell Hitchcock, best known as the lead singer of Air Supply, released in 1988. The album did not reach the charts, though singles "Someone Who Believes in You", "I Can't Believe My Eyes" and the covers "The Sun Ain't Gonna Shine Anymore", "What Becomes of the Brokenhearted" and "Where Did the Feeling Go?" had minor recognition.

As a solo artist, Hitchcock would later release several more singles, the most famous being "Swear to Your Heart" from the film Arachnophobia. Others include duets with Judith Durham from the I Am an Australian album, "De Todos Modos" with Ednita Nazario from the album Super Exitos (1991) and "Is It You" with Rita Coolidge (1995).

Also of note is the track "The River Cried", which was first recorded by former Scandal vocalist/songwriter Patty Smyth for her 1987 debut solo album (the version heard here is 12 seconds shorter).

== Track listing ==
1. "Someone Who Believes in You" (Gerry Goffin, Carole King) 4:12
2. "The Sun Ain't Gonna Shine (Anymore)" (Bob Crewe, Bob Gaudio) 3:41
3. "What Becomes of the Brokenhearted" (James Dean, Paul Riser, William Weatherspoon) 3:38
4. "I Come Alive" (Albert Hammond, Randy Kerber) 3:42
5. "The River Cried" (Tom Kelly, Billy Steinberg) 4:04
6. "Dreams of the Lonely" (Myles Hunter) 4:54
7. "Best Intentions" (George Merrill, Shannon Rubicam) 4:28
8. "I Can't Believe My Eyes" (John Bettis, Jon Lind) 4:30
9. "Where Did the Feeling Go?" (Norman Saleet) 3:46
10. "Make It Feel Like Home Again" (Tom Kelly, Billy Steinberg) 3:36

== Personnel ==
- Michael Baird - drums
- Dennis Belfield - bass
- Susan Boyd - backing vocals
- Robbie Buchanan - keyboards
- Rosemary Butler - backing vocals
- Denny Carmassi - drums
- Peter Gifford - bass guitar
- Merry Clayton - backing vocals
- Jim Cox - synthesizer, keyboards
- Bill Cuomo - bass, keyboards
- Greg Ham - keyboards, backing vocals
- Mike Curb - arranger
- John d'Andrea - arranger
- Michael Fisher - percussion
- Randy Foote - backing vocals
- Tommy Funderburk - backing vocals
- Claude Gaudette - synthesizer, arranger, keyboards
- Jim Gilstrap - backing vocals
- Gary Herbig - tenor saxophone
- Carroll Sue Hill - backing vocals
- Russell Hitchcock - vocals, backing vocals
- Mark Hudson - backing vocals
- Dann Huff - guitar
- Laurence Juber - guitar
- Edie Lehmann - backing vocals
- Paul Leim - drums
- Michael Lloyd - synthesizer, arranger, keyboards
- Myrna Matthews - backing vocals
- Alan Pasqua - keyboards
- Eric Persing - synthesizer
- Aaron Rapoport - photography
- Neil Stubenhaus - bass
- Owen Waters - backing vocals

== Production ==
- Producers: Robbie Buchanan, Mike Curb, Jimmy Ienner, Michael Lloyd, Keith Olsen; assisted by Dan Nebenzal
- Recording engineers: Brian Foraker, Michael Lloyd, Jack Joseph Puig; assisted by Dan Nebenzal
- Mixing: Brian Foraker, Carmine Rubino
- Remixing: Jeremy Smith & Frank Wolf

=== Additional credits ===
- Art direction: Maude Gilman

== Note ==
The B-sides to all the singles released from this album also appear here, except for the B-side to "The River Cried", being a
song called "Heart & Soul", which originally appeared as a track ("Heart and Soul") on Air Supply's Hearts in Motion album.
