= This One's for You (OTT album) =

Studio album by OTT
- Released: 1997
- Genre: Pop
- Label: Epic
- Producer: Phil Harding, Ian Curnow, Julian Gallagher, Steve Mac, Chris Porter, Ian Levine, Ray Hedges

Singles from This One's for You
- 1. "I Can't Give You Anything But My Love" Released: 1996; 2. "Let Me In" Released: 1996; 3. "All Out of Love" Released: 1996; 4. "Forever Girl" Released: 1996; 5. "The Story of Love" Released: 1998

This One's for You is the only studio album by Irish boy band OTT. It was released in 1997 by Epic Records. The band achieved four Irish top ten singles, but only managed to chart outside the top 10 with three singles in the UK.

== Track listing ==
No.	Title	Writer(s)	Producer(s)	Length
1.	"Let Me In"	Alan Osmond, Merrill Osmond, Wayne Osmond	Phil Harding, Ian Curnow, Julian Gallagher^{[a]}	3:52
2.	"Forever Girl"	Phil Manikiza, Simon Stirling	Harding, Curnow, Gallagher^{[a]}	3:16
3.	"Always"		Harding, Curnow, Gallagher^{[a]}	3:35
4.	"I Miss You All Over"		Steve Mac	4:00
5.	"The Story of Love"	George Merrill, Shannon Rubicam	Chris Porter	3:45
6.	"This Game Is Over"		Ian Levine	4:02
7.	"I Can't Give You Anything But My Love"	Hugo Peretti, Luigi Creatore, George David Weiss	Levine	3:59
8.	"All Out of Love"	Graham Russell, Clive Davis	Harding, Curnow, Gallagher^{[a]}	4:15
9.	"Ain't Done Loving You"		Mac	3:50
10.	"Be My Girl"	Andy Caine, Phil Harding, Ian Curnow	Harding, Curnow, Gallagher^{[a]}	4:07
11.	"Wake Up with You"		Porter	3:38
12.	"Everytime You Go"	OTT, Gallagher, Harding, Curnow	Harding, Curnow, Gallagher^{[a]}	3:40
13.	"Whatever It Takes"	Caine, Gallagher, Harding, Curnow	Harding, Curnow, Gallagher^{[a]}	3:48
14.	"This One's for You"	Ray Hedges, Martin Brannigan	Hedges	3:22

Notes

- ^{^[a]} signifies an assistant producer
