= Journey (Arif Mardin album) =

Studio album by Arif Mardin
- Released: Winter/Spring 1974
- Recorded: 1973
- Label: Atlantic
- Producer: Arif Mardin

Arif Mardin chronology
Glass Onion (1970)	Journey (1974)	All My Friends Are Here (2010)

Professional ratings
Review scores
Source	Rating
Allmusic	link

Journey is the second album released by record producer Arif Mardin as leader. Released on the Atlantic label in 1974, it features "a veritable who's who of funk and jazz greats", many of them regular session and studio musicians who appear on Mardin-produced albums for other artists.

== Track listing ==
All tracks written by Arif Mardin.

1. "Street Scene: Strollin'"
2. "Street Scene: Dark Alleys"
3. "Street Scene: Love on a Rainy Afternoon"
4. "Street Scene: Parade"
5. "A Sunday Afternoon Feeling"
6. "Journey: Journey"
7. "Journey: Flight"
8. "Forms"

== Personnel ==
- Arif Mardin – percussion, piano, electric piano
- Pepper Adams – baritone saxophone
- Kenneth Bichel – synthesizer, electric piano
- Alex Blake – bass
- Phil Bodner – oboe, alto saxophone
- Michael Brecker – tenor saxophone
- Randy Brecker – trumpet, flugelhorn
- Barnett Brown - trombone
- Garnett Brown – trombone
- James Buffington – French horn
- Gary Burton – vibraphone
- Don Butterfield – tuba
- Ron Carter – bass
- Urszula Dudziak – vocals
- Billy Cobham – drums
- Cornell Dupree – guitar
- George Devens – percussion
- Gordon Edwards – bass
- Joe Farrell – oboe, tenor saxophone, soprano saxophone
- Jerry Friedman – guitar
- Steve Gadd - drums
- Armen Halburian – percussion
- Hubert Laws – flute
- Milcho Leviev – clarinet
- Tony Levin – bass
- Mel Davis – trumpet
- Ralph MacDonald – percussion
- David "Fathead" Newman – alto saxophone
- Gene Orloff – violin
- Romeo Penque – baritone saxophone
- Seldon Powell – tenor saxophone
- Bernard Purdie – drums
- Pat Rebillot – electric piano, clavinet
- George Ricci – cello
- Billy Slapin – woodwind
- Todd Sommer – percussion
- David Spinozza – guitar
- Marvin Stamm – trumpet
- Tony Studd – trombone
- Grady Tate – drums
- Richard Tee – electric piano
- Michal Urbaniak – violin
- Frank Wess – alto saxophone
