= Vincent Lionti =

American violist (1959–2020)

- Born: April 9, 1959; Bethesda, Maryland
- Died: April 3, 2020 (aged 60); New York City, New York, U.S.
- Education: Juilliard School
- Occupations: Violist, conductor

Vincent Lionti (1959 – April 4, 2020) was an American violist for the Met Orchestra, and a conductor.
