= Waiting for a Star to Fall =

1988 single by Boy Meets Girl

Single by Boy Meets Girl

from the album Reel Life
- B-side: "No Apologies"; "Restless Dreamer"
- Released: June 10, 1988
- Genre: Pop
- Length: 4:34
- Label: RCA
- Songwriters: Shannon Rubicam; George Merrill
- Producer: Arif Mardin

Boy Meets Girl singles chronology
"Oh Girl" (1985)	"Waiting for a Star to Fall" (1988)	"Bring Down the Moon" (1988)

Music video
- "Waiting for a Star to Fall” on YouTube

"Waiting for a Star to Fall" is a song by American pop music duo Boy Meets Girl, written by the duo's members, Shannon Rubicam and George Merrill. They wrote the song after witnessing a falling star at a Whitney Houston concert and originally offered the song to Houston, but Arista Records CEO Clive Davis rejected it. American singer Belinda Carlisle then recorded a demo of the song but refused its inclusion on her 1987 album Heaven on Earth, so Rubicam and Merrill decided to record and release the song themselves.

"Waiting for a Star to Fall" was released in June 1988 as the lead single from Boy Meets Girl's second studio album, Reel Life (1988). The song became a chart hit in several countries, reaching number five on the US Billboard Hot 100, number one in Canada, number five in Ireland, and number nine in the United Kingdom. Since its release, it has been remixed and covered by many artists, including Cabin Crew and Sunset Strippers, who experienced concurrent success with their reworkings in 2005.

== Background ==
"Waiting for a Star to Fall" was written by Shannon Rubicam and George Merrill, and was inspired by an actual falling star that Rubicam had seen during a Whitney Houston concert at the Greek Theatre in Los Angeles. The duo did not initially consider recording the song themselves, instead submitting it to Arista's CEO Clive Davis, in the hope that he would decide to use it on Houston's second studio album, Whitney. Even though Rubicam and Merrill had written Houston's previous hit "How Will I Know", Davis rejected "Waiting for a Star to Fall", suggesting that it did not suit her. This then inspired Merrill and Rubicam to create Houston's 1987 hit "I Wanna Dance with Somebody (Who Loves Me)". Meanwhile, "Waiting for a Star to Fall" was then offered to and recorded by Belinda Carlisle for her 1987 release Heaven on Earth, at the insistence of her label, but Carlisle disliked it and refused to include it on the album. This demo version has, however, circulated on an unofficial compilation of that album's outtakes.

The tenor saxophone solo on the Boy Meets Girl version was provided in a session recording early in the career of Andy Snitzer, who later found success as a solo artist.

== Release and reception ==
Merrill and Rubicam decided to record the song themselves for their second album Reel Life. Released as a single on June 10, 1988, it became a hit in the United States, reaching number one on the Billboard Adult Contemporary chart and number five on the Billboard Hot 100. Issued in the United Kingdom on November 14, 1988, the song reached number nine on the UK Singles Chart in January 1989, having entered the chart in December 1988. It remains their sole top-40 hit in the UK. The song also reached number 35 on Australia's ARIA Singles Chart in April 1989. After the song was used as the closing theme to the 1990 movie Three Men and a Little Lady, the single was re-released in 1991 with a new picture sleeve featuring the actors of the film. The re-release peaked at number 76 in the UK.

Johnny Loftus of AllMusic remarked that the song was "just a classic", and that "the urgency as it drives toward its chorus is a clinic for durable songwriting."

== Music video ==
The video for the song, directed by Australian director Claudia Castle, features scenes of Merrill and Rubicam singing it on a beach and inside a house. Also featured are scenes of a group of children playing with bubbles, including the couple's young daughter Hilary.

== Track listings ==
7-inch, cassette, and mini-CD single

1. "Waiting for a Star to Fall" – 4:34
2. "No Apologies" – 4:21

12-inch and CD single

1. "Waiting for a Star to Fall" – 4:34
2. "No Apologies" – 4:21
3. "Restless Dreamer" – 4:33

1991 7-inch single

A. "Waiting for a Star to Fall"
B. "The Three Men Rap" (by Tom Selleck, Steve Guttenberg, and Ted Danson)

1991 12-inch and CD single

1. "Waiting for a Star to Fall"
2. "The Three Men Rap" (by Selleck, Guttenberg, and Danson)
3. "Goodnight Sweetheart Goodnight aka Goodnight It's Time to Go" (by Selleck, Guttenberg, and Danson)

== Personnel ==
Personnel are lifted from the Reel Life liner notes.

- George Merrill – writing, piano, synthesizers, bass, drum programming
- Shannon Rubicam – writing
- Susan Boyd – additional vocals
- John Goux – guitar
- Joe Mardin – "crowning touch"
- Denny Fongheiser – drums
- Michael Jochum – drums
- Andy Snitzer – alto saxophone

== Charts ==
=== Weekly charts ===
Weekly chart performance for "Waiting for a Star to Fall"
Chart (1988–1989)	Peak position
Australia (ARIA)	35
Belgium (Ultratop 50 Flanders)	37
Canada Retail Singles (The Record)	1
Canada Top Singles (RPM)	2
Europe (Eurochart Hot 100)	37
Iceland (Dagblaðið Vísir)	2
Ireland (IRMA)	5
Italy Airplay (Music & Media)	4
Netherlands (Single Top 100)	62
New Zealand (Recorded Music NZ)	25
UK Singles (Official Charts)	9
US Billboard Hot 100	5
US Adult Contemporary (Billboard)	1
US CHR/Pop Airplay (Radio & Records)	7
West Germany (GfK)	22

1991 chart performance for "Waiting for a Star to Fall"
Chart (1991)	Peak position
UK Singles (Official Charts)	76

=== Year-end charts ===
1988 year-end chart performance for "Waiting for a Star to Fall"
Chart (1988)	Position
Canada Top Singles (RPM)	87

1989 year-end chart performance for "Waiting for a Star to Fall"
Chart (1989)	Position
Canada Top Singles (RPM)	93
US Billboard Hot 100	12
US Adult Contemporary (Billboard)	13

== Certifications ==
Certifications and sales for "Waiting for a Star to Fall"
Region	Certification	Certified units/sales
United Kingdom (BPI)	Gold	400,000^{‡}
^{‡} Sales+streaming figures based on certification alone.

== Release history ==
Release dates and formats for "Waiting for a Star to Fall"
Region	Date	Format(s)	Label(s)	Ref.
United States	June 10, 1988	7-inch vinyl; cassette	RCA	
United Kingdom	November 14, 1988	7-inch vinyl; 12-inch vinyl	RCA	
United Kingdom	January 9, 1989	CD	RCA	
Japan	January 21, 1989	Mini-CD	RCA	

== Covers and remixes ==
"Star to Fall"

Single by Cabin Crew
- Released: 2005
- Length: 2:47 (radio edit)
- Label: Vicious Grooves
- Songwriters: Shannon Rubicam; George Merrill
- Producers: Ben Garden; Rob Kittler

Cabin Crew singles chronology
"Star to Fall" (2005)	"Can't Stop It" (2008)

"Falling Stars"

Single by Sunset Strippers
- Released: February 28, 2005
- Length: 3:19
- Label: Direction
- Songwriters: Shannon Rubicam; George Merrill; Sunset Strippers
- Producer: Sunset Strippers

The song has been covered and remixed several times. The most commercially successful versions came in 2005, when Australian musical group Cabin Crew remixed the song as "Star to Fall" (or "Star2Fall") but were refused the sampling of the original lyrics by Sony BMG. Liking what Cabin Crew had done, however, George Merrill agreed to re-record the vocals. Meanwhile, Sony BMG had British musical group Sunset Strippers remix the original track under the title "Falling Stars". Both versions peaked within the top five of the UK Singles Chart in March 2005.

=== Charts ===
==== "Star to Fall" ====
===== Weekly charts =====
Weekly chart performance for "Star to Fall"
Chart (2005)	Peak position
Australia (ARIA)	25
Australian Club Chart (ARIA)	4
Australian Dance (ARIA)	2
Austria (Ö3 Austria Top 40)	51
Belgium (Ultratop 50 Flanders)	37
Europe (Eurochart Hot 100)	16
Finland (Suomen virallinen lista)	4
France (SNEP)	53
Germany (GfK)	35
Hungary (Dance Top 40)	19
Hungary (Editors' Choice Top 40)	28
Ireland (IRMA)	13
Ireland Dance (IRMA)	1
Italy (FIMI)	31
Netherlands (Dutch Top 40)	15
Netherlands (Single Top 100)	24
Scottish Singles Sales (Official Charts)	3
Switzerland (Schweizer Hitparade)	84
UK Singles (Official Charts)	4
UK Dance (Official Charts)	8
UK Indie (Official Charts)	45

===== Year-end charts =====
Year-end chart performance for "Star to Fall"
Chart (2005)	Position
Australian Club Chart (ARIA)	38
UK Singles (OCC)	80

==== "Falling Stars" ====
===== Weekly charts =====
Weekly chart performance for "Falling Stars"
Chart (2005)	Peak position
Australia (ARIA)	26
Australian Club Chart (ARIA)	34
Australian Dance (ARIA)	2
Austria (Ö3 Austria Top 40)	43
Denmark (Tracklisten)	8
Europe (Eurochart Hot 100)	10
Germany (GfK)	19
Ireland (IRMA)	5
Ireland Dance (IRMA)	1
Scottish Singles Sales (Official Charts)	2
Sweden (Sverigetopplistan)	23
UK Singles (Official Charts)	3
UK Dance (Official Charts)	7

===== Year-end charts =====
Year-end chart performance for "Falling Stars"
Chart (2005)	Position
UK Singles (OCC)	46

=== Other versions ===
- The track "In My Arms" by British electronic musician Mylo sampled the song and was featured on Mylo's album Destroy Rock & Roll. His version also samples Kim Carnes' "Bette Davis Eyes" and made it to number 15 in the United Kingdom in 2005.
- In December 2012, a rock version of the song was released by the band Lionville on their album Lionville II.
- In December 2013, a stripped back indie version of the song was released by the English band Young Kato. It was featured on the Made in Chelsea soundtrack.
- Also in December 2013, a folk cover of the song by Icelandic singer Yohanna surfaced on the Internet.
- In March 2014, a folk cover of the song by English singer Diana Vickers surfaced on the Internet.
- In September 2017, Australian singer George Maple interpolated the song as part of her single "Hero".
