= After All the Bars Are Closed =

2024 single by Thomas Rhett

Single by Thomas Rhett

from the album About a Woman
- Released: August 9, 2024
- Genre: Country
- Length: 3:11
- Label: Valory
- Songwriters: Thomas Rhett; Julian Bunetta; John Byron; Jaxson Free; Jacob Kasher Hindlin
- Producers: Julian Bunetta; Dann Huff

Thomas Rhett singles chronology
"Beautiful as You" (2024)	"After All the Bars Are Closed" (2024)	"Nothing Else" (2025)

Music video
- "After All the Bars Are Closed" on YouTube

"After All the Bars Are Closed" is a song by the American country music singer Thomas Rhett. It was released on August 9, 2024, as the second single from his seventh studio album, About a Woman. The song was written by Rhett, Julian Bunetta, John Byron, Jaxson Free and Jacob Kasher Hindlin, and produced by Bunetta and Dann Huff.

== Contents ==
"After All the Bars Are Closed" expresses about a night out with a new lover he met in a bar.

== Critical reception ==
HollerCountry writer Maxim Mower compared it to the album's first single ("Beautiful as You"), and felt that it had "a comforting guitar riff gains prominence, with the easygoing composition cushioning Rhett's evocative delivery".

== Music video ==
The music video was released at the same time as the song's initial release as a promotional single on August 9, 2024. It shows Rhett and his friends having a good old-fashioned good time at a bonfire once for the night.

== Live performances ==
Rhett performed "After All the Bars Are Closed" with his acoustic guitar on The Tonight Show in August 2024.

== Personnel ==
Credits adapted from YouTube.

- Thomas Rhett – vocals
- Julian Bunetta – drums, acoustic guitar, bass guitar, keyboards, percussion, production, programming, recording
- Dann Huff – banjo, electric guitar, mandolin, acoustic guitar, production
- Buckley Miller – recording
- Zach Kuhlman – recording
- Jeff Gunnell – engineering
- Alex Ghenea – mixing
- Mike "Frog" Griffith – production coordination
- Ilya Toshinskiy – acoustic guitar
- Kris Donegan – electric guitar
- Derek Wells – electric guitar
- Paul Franklin – steel guitar
- Mark Hill – bass
- Charlie Judge – keyboards
- Jaxson Free – drums, programming
- Harrison Tate – mastering
- Nathan Dantzler – mastering

== Charts ==
=== Weekly charts ===
Weekly chart performance for "After All the Bars Are Closed"
Chart (2024–2025)	Peak position
Canada Hot 100 (Billboard)	46
Canada Country (Billboard)	1
US Billboard Hot 100	35
US Country Airplay (Billboard)	1
US Hot Country Songs (Billboard)	8

=== Year-end charts ===
Year-end chart performance for "After All the Bars Are Closed"
Chart (2025)	Position
Canada (Canadian Hot 100)	84
US Billboard Hot 100	88
US Country Airplay (Billboard)	6
US Hot Country Songs (Billboard)	25

== Certifications ==
Certifications for "After All the Bars Are Closed"
Region	Certification	Certified units/sales
Canada (Music Canada)	Gold	40,000^{‡}
^{‡} Sales+streaming figures based on certification alone.

== Release history ==
Release dates and formats for "After All the Bars Are Closed"
Region	Date	Format(s)	Label(s)	Ref.
United States	August 9, 2024	Digital download; streaming	Valory	
United States	February 18, 2025	Country radio	Valory	
