= Richard Gibbs =

American composer and producer (born 1955)

- Born: December 5, 1955 (age 70); Bay Village, Ohio, U.S.
- Genres: Film score
- Occupations: Composer, orchestrator, conductor
- Years active: 1981–present

Richard Gibbs (born December 5, 1955) is an American film composer and music producer whose credits include Dr. Dolittle, Big Momma's House, Queen of the Damned, the television series Battlestar Galactica and the first season of The Simpsons.

== Musical career ==
Gibbs was the keyboard player for the new wave band Oingo Boingo from 1980 to 1984. He was also a session player, performing on over 150 albums for artists as diverse as War, Tom Waits, Boy Meets Girl, Living in a Box, Robert Palmer, and Aretha Franklin. His professional relationship with Mr. Palmer began after he wrote a tongue-in-cheek letter of complaint about loud music emanating from Palmer's Bahamian condo, which was immediately next door to the one Gibbs was staying in while working on another project at Compass Point studios.

Gibbs started with Michael Jochum the band Zuma II, which had an eponymously titled record released by Pasha/CBS Records. He has appeared live with Korn, The Staples, Chaka Khan, and Oingo Boingo.

Like his former bandmate Danny Elfman, Gibbs has embarked on a life of scoring movies and television shows. He has written the scores for over sixty films that have collectively grossed well over $1 billion in box office receipts worldwide (Dr. Dolittle, Step Into Liquid, Say Anything... and Queen of the Damned, among others) and acted as musical director and composer for various television shows, including Muppets Tonight!, The Simpsons, and Battlestar Galactica. He has worked extensively with actress-comedian Tracey Ullman, on her various projects.

His critically well-received collaboration with Jonathan Davis (lead singer of Korn) on the songs and score for Queen of the Damned led to a gold record.

Gibbs produced the second full-length record for the Warner Bros. Records band Eisley, "Combinations." Pre-production took place in Tyler, TX, home of the band, and tracking took place in Malibu in his studio The Woodshed in mid-September 2006. The record was released on August 14, 2007. He also found the time to serve as music director and arranger for Korn's appearance on MTV Unplugged, broadcast in February 2007. He produced the record of that event, which arrived in February as well.

Past projects include scoring the multiple award winning drama Face to Face for Battlestar Galactica and Queen of the Damned director Michael Rymer. He produced former Mr. Mister (Broken Wings) band member Richard Page's solo disc "Peculiar Life" and is currently producing a collection of songs by an adventurous new band, Purple Mountains Majesties.

He consistently works with directors Betty Thomas (Dr. Dolittle, 28 Days, I Spy), John Schultz (Judy Moody and the Not Bummer Summer, Like Mike, The Honeymooners), along with the aforementioned Michael Rymer, and Tracey Ullman.

Gibbs' songwriting and theme credits include "Until the Stars Fall" (co-written and produced with Mark Hoppus of Blink-182 for the movie Fired Up!), the theme to the re-imagined Battlestar Galactica series, the Muppets Tonight! theme, and the aforementioned Queen of the Damned songs. The Queen of the Damned songs were co-written and produced with Jonathan Davis; the songs were reperformed for the CD release by Chester Bennington (Linkin Park), Marilyn Manson, David Draiman (Disturbed), Jay Gordon (Orgy), and Wayne Static (Static-X).

== Woodshed Recording ==
Gibbs is the owner of a state of the art ocean view Malibu studio, Woodshed Recording. Since 2004, Woodshed has hosted artists and producers such as Barbra Streisand, U2, Sting, Pink, Lenny Kravitz, Max Martin, Foster the People, Coldplay, Ryan Tedder, Paul Epworth, Walter Afanasieff, and Kenny 'Babyface' Edmonds. Woodshed features a revolutionary modular wall system that allows for dozens of different studio configurations, allowing Woodshed to accommodate small intimate bands as well as larger ensembles.

== Composers Breakfast Club ==
The Composers Breakfast Club was formed by Richard Gibbs in 2013. It began as a means to connect, enjoy a meal together with friends and explore all aspects of the world of music, whilst slowly inviting more friends to join in the camaraderie. Similar to The Socrates School and the Inklings, The Composers Breakfast Club is dedicated to connecting musicians with other musicians and creating a space for critical thinking and debate about our current world.

The CBC has expanded unabated to this day yet continues to adhere to the original basis of its founding - friends helping friends. They added featured presenters every week, from illustrious music makers to thought leaders in science, politics, business and beyond. Rather than expanding the weekly group well past their average of 65 attendees (and hence losing intimacy), the CBC has added additional chapters that meet in other parts of greater Los Angeles on other days of the week (Venice, Agoura, and Silver Lake) and a chapter in Nashville and the rumblings of a new one in New York City. Being a composer is not a requirement to join the club.

== Armory of Harmony ==
Gibbs is the founder of Armory of Harmony, a nonprofit which facilitates the creation of musical instruments from decommissioned firearms and distributes those instruments to high school and college marching bands and ensembles.

== Invisible Arts ==
In 2020, Gibbs created invisible arts, a podcasts series telling the stories Gibbs has accumulated over a lifetime in the music industry. He tells stories about his time working with artists such as Tracey Ullman, Robert Palmer, Danny Elfman, Tim Curry, and many more.

== Personal life ==
Gibbs earned an Associate of Arts degree from Daytona Beach Community College while still enrolled as a senior in high school. He went on to matriculate with bachelor's degree in classical composition from Boston's Berklee College of Music before moving to California. He and his wife Linda have three children, Keegan Gibbs, Riley Gibbs and Katelin Gibbs.

== Filmography ==
Year	Title	Director(s)	Studio(s)	Notes
1988	Sweet Hearts Dance	Robert Greenwald	TriStar Pictures	—N/a
1989	Say Anything...	Cameron Crowe	20th Century Fox	Composed with Anne Dudley
1990	A Gnome Named Gnorm	Stan Winston	Vestron Pictures	—N/a
1991	Wedlock	Lewis Teague	HBO Films	Television film
1991	Bingo	Matthew Robbins	TriStar Pictures	—N/a
1992	Once Upon a Crime	Eugene Levy	Metro-Goldwyn-Mayer	—N/a
1992	Ladybugs	Sidney J. Furie	Paramount Pictures	—N/a
1992	Passed Away	Charlie Peters	Hollywood Pictures	—N/a
1992	The Gun in Betty Lou's Handbag	Allan Moyle	Touchstone Pictures	—N/a
1993	Amos & Andrew	E. Max Frye	Castle Rock Entertainment	—N/a
1993	Son in Law	Steve Rash	Hollywood Pictures	—N/a
1993	Fatal Instinct	Carl Reiner	Metro-Goldwyn-Mayer	—N/a
1994	The Chase	Adam Rifkin	20th Century Fox	—N/a
1994	Clifford	Paul Flaherty	Orion Pictures	—N/a
1995	Dangerous Indiscretion	Richard Kletter	Chanticleer Films	Direct-to-video film
1996	First Kid	David Mickey Evans	Walt Disney Pictures	—N/a
1997	That Darn Cat	Bob Spiers	Walt Disney Pictures	—N/a
1998	Music from Another Room	Charlie Peters	Orion Pictures	—N/a
1998	Dirty Work	Bob Saget	Metro-Goldwyn-Mayer	—N/a
1998	Dr. Dolittle	Betty Thomas	20th Century Fox	—N/a
1999	The Book of Stars	Michael Miner	Showcase Entertainment	Direct-to-video film
1999	10 Things I Hate About You	Gil Junger	Touchstone Pictures	—N/a
2000	Big Momma's House	Raja Gosnell	20th Century Fox	—N/a
2000	28 Days	Betty Thomas	Columbia Pictures	—N/a
2002	Queen of the Damned	Michael Rymer	Warner Bros.	Composed with Jonathan Davis
2002	Like Mike	John Schultz	20th Century Fox	—N/a
2002	I Spy	Betty Thomas	Columbia Pictures	—N/a
2003	101 Dalmatians II: Patch's London Adventure	Jim Kammerud; Brian Smith	Walt Disney Studios Home Entertainment; DisneyToon Studios	Direct-to-video film
2003	When Zachary Beaver Came to Town	John Schultz	Echo Bridge	—N/a
2003	Love Don't Cost a Thing	Troy Beyer	Warner Bros.	—N/a
2004	My Baby's Daddy	Cheryl Dunye	Miramax	—N/a
2004	Barbershop 2: Back in Business	Kevin Rodney Sullivan	Metro-Goldwyn-Mayer	—N/a
2004	Johnson Family Vacation	Christopher Erskin	Fox Searchlight Pictures	—N/a
2004	Fat Albert	Joel Zwick	20th Century Fox	—N/a
2005	The Honeymooners	John Schultz	Paramount Pictures	—N/a
2006	Valley of the Heart's Delight	Tim Boxell	Indican Pictures	—N/a
2006	John Tucker Must Die	Betty Thomas	20th Century Fox	—N/a
2007	Cleaner	Renny Harlin	Millennium Films	Direct-to-video film
2009	Fired Up!	Will Gluck	Screen Gems	—N/a
2010	Christmas Cupid	Gil Junger	ABC Family	Television film
2011	Judy Moody and the Not Bummer Summer	John Schultz	Relativity Media	—N/a
2011	Teen Spirit	Gil Junger	ABC Family	Television film
2011	Face to Face	Michael Rymer	Umbrella Entertainment	—N/a
2012	Let It Shine	Paul Hoen	Disney Channel	Television film
2016	Adventures in Babysitting	John Schultz	Disney Channel	Television film
2017	Love Beats Rhymes	RZA	Lionsgate Films	—N/a

== Awards ==
=== BMI Film and TV Awards ===
Year	Film	Category	Result
1999	Dr. Dolittle	Film Music Award	Won
2001	Big Momma's House	Film Music Award	Won

=== DVD Exclusive Awards ===
Year	Film	Category	Result
2001	The Book of Stars	Best Original Score	Won
2003	101 Dalmatians II: Patch's London Adventure	Best Original Score in a DVD Premiere Movie	Won
2003	101 Dalmatians II: Patch's London Adventure	Best Original Song in a DVD Premiere Movie	Nominated

== See also ==
- Music of Battlestar Galactica (reimagining)
