= About a Woman =

Studio album by Thomas Rhett
- Released: August 23, 2024
- Genre: Country
- Length: 43:52
- Label: Valory
- Producer: Afterhrs; Ammo; Casey Brown; Julian Bunetta; Paul DiGiovanni; Charlie Handsome; Scott Hendricks; Mark Holman; Dann Huff; Josh Kerr; Joe Reeves; John Ryan; Micah Tawlks; Mark Trussell

Thomas Rhett chronology
20 Number Ones (2023)	About a Woman (2024)

Singles from About a Woman
- 1. "Beautiful as You" Released: May 13, 2024; 2. "After All the Bars Are Closed" Released: August 9, 2024; 3. "Somethin' 'Bout a Woman" Released: November 15, 2024; 4. "Ain't a Bad Life" Released: September 22, 2025

About a Woman is the seventh studio album by American country music artist Thomas Rhett. It was released on August 23, 2024, through Valory. The album's lead single, "Beautiful as You", was released on May 13, 2024. A deluxe edition of the album, which features nine new tracks and collaborative remixes of "Somethin' 'Bout a Woman" and "What Could Go Right," was released on September 26, 2025. This is the first studio album in Rhett's career to not feature any tracks co-written by his father Rhett Akins.

== Content ==
Thomas Rhett co-wrote 13 of the 14 tracks on About a Woman, and longtime collaborators Julian Bunetta and Dan Huff executive produced the album. Rhett, who first began working on the album in April 2023, noted that the title's inspiration came from his wife, Lauren, and his commitment to her. He described the album's recording process as wanting "to exude joy and fun with this project—and really just make people move". The album is largely described as up-tempo, with the closing track, "I Could Spend Forever Loving You", being its only ballad. The track "Don't Wanna Dance" interpolates Whitney Houston's "I Wanna Dance with Somebody (Who Loves Me)", one of many examples of the album's influence of "retro 80s sounds and thumping beats" over a more organic country foundation.

== Track listing ==
About a Woman track listing
No.	Title	Writer(s)	Producer(s)	Length
1.	"Fool"	Thomas Rhett; Rocky Block; Julian Bunetta; John Byron; Alexander Izquiero; Zaire Kelsey; Ryan Vojtesak	Bunetta; Charlie Handsome	3:00
2.	"Overdrive"	Rhett; Bunetta; Jacob Kasher Hindlin; John Ryan	Bunetta; Dann Huff; Ryan	3:38
3.	"Gone Country"	Rhett; Block; Bunetta; Byron; Hindlin; Joe Reeves; Vojtesak	Bunetta; Charlie Handsome; Huff; Reeves	2:43
4.	"Beautiful as You"	Rhett; Bunetta; Joshua Coleman; Izquierdo; Hindlin; Kelsey; Ryan	Ammo; Bunetta; Huff; Ryan	2:43
5.	"Can't Love You Anymore"	Rhett; Bunetta; Hindlin; Ryan	Bunetta; Huff; Ryan	3:34
6.	"After All the Bars Are Closed"	Rhett; Bunetta; Byron; Jaxson Free; Hindlin	Bunetta; Huff	3:11
7.	"Church"	Rhett; Andy Albert; Jordan Minton; Mark Trussell	Bunetta; Huff; Trussell	3:24
8.	"Back to Blue"	Rhett; Bunetta; Andrew Haas; Ryan	Afterhrs; Bunetta; Huff	2:50
9.	"Country for California"	Will Bundy; Rodney Clawson; John Morgan; Justin Wilson	Bunetta; Huff	3:37
10.	"Somethin' 'Bout a Woman"	Rhett; Bunetta; Haas; Ryan	Bunetta; Huff	3:30
11.	"What Could Go Right"	Rhett; Block; Byron; Josh Kerr	Bunetta; Huff; Kerr	3:31
12.	"Boots"	Rhett; Bunetta; Haas; Ryan	Bunetta; Huff; Micah Tawlks	2:25
13.	"Don't Wanna Dance"	Rhett; Matt Dragstrem; Ryan Hurd; George Merrill; Shannon Rubicam	Bunetta; Huff	2:58
14.	"I Could Spend Forever Loving You"	Rhett; Mark Holman; Huff	Bunetta; Holman; Huff	2:48
Total length:				43:52

About a Woman (Deluxe Edition) track listing
No.	Title	Writer(s)	Producer(s)	Length
1.	"Water"	Thomas Rhett; Rocky Block; John Byron; Josh Kerr	Julian Bunetta; Dann Huff; Kerr	2:58
2.	"Chapter 10"	Blake Pendergrass; Byron	Bunetta; Huff	3:33
3.	"On a River"	Rhett; Parker Welling; Casey Brown	Brown	3:33
4.	"Ain't a Bad Life" (featuring Jordan Davis)	Rhett; Mark Trussell; Byron; Ashley Gorley; Pendergrass	Paul DiGiovanni; Trussell	3:08
5.	"Old Tricks" (featuring Blake Shelton)	Rhett; Bunetta; John Ryan; Jim Beavers; Andrew Haas; Ian Franzino	Bunetta; Scott Hendricks; Huff	3:06
6.	"Bottle with Your Name on It"	Rhett; Bunetta; Ryan; Haas; Jacob Kasher Hindlin	Bunetta; Huff	2:46
7.	"Small Town Girls" (featuring Tucker Wetmore)	Rhett; Bunetta; Kerr; Byron; Block; Franzino; Haas; Ryan	Bunetta; Huff; Kerr	2:30
8.	"I'm That Guy"	Rhett; Kerr; Block; Byron	Bunetta; Huff	2:32
9.	"Dance with You"	Rhett; Byron; Gorley; Ben Johnson; Pendergrass; Ryan Vojtesak	Bunetta; Huff	3:25
10.	"After All the Bars Are Closed"	Rhett; Bunetta; Byron; Jaxson Free; Hindlin	Bunetta; Huff	3:11
11.	"Somethin' 'Bout a Woman" (featuring Teddy Swims)	Rhett; Bunetta; Haas; Ryan	Bunetta; Huff	3:27
12.	"Beautiful as You"	Rhett; Bunetta; Joshua Coleman; Izquierdo; Hindlin; Kelsey; Ryan	Ammo; Bunetta; Huff; Ryan	2:43
13.	"What Could Go Right" (featuring Lanie Gardner)	Rhett; Block; Byron; Kerr	Bunetta; Huff; Kerr	3:31
14.	"Gone Country"	Rhett; Block; Bunetta; Byron; Hindlin; Joe Reeves; Vojtesak	Bunetta; Charlie Handsome; Huff; Reeves	2:43
15.	"Overdrive"	Rhett; Bunetta; Hindlin; Ryan	Bunetta; Huff; Ryan	3:38
16.	"Can't Love You Anymore"	Rhett; Bunetta; Hindlin; Ryan	Bunetta; Huff; Ryan	3:34
17.	"Back to Blue"	Rhett; Bunetta; Haas; Ryan	Afterhrs; Bunetta; Huff	2:50
18.	"Church"	Rhett; Andy Albert; Jordan Minton; Mark Trussell	Bunetta; Huff; Trussell	3:24
19.	"I Could Spend Forever Loving You"	Rhett; Mark Holman; Huff	Bunetta; Holman; Huff	2:48
20.	"Fool"	Rhett; Block; Bunetta; Byron; Alexander Izquiero; Zaire Kelsey; Vojtesak	Bunetta; Charlie Handsome	3:00
21.	"Don't Wanna Dance"	Rhett; Matt Dragstrem; Ryan Hurd; George Merrill; Shannon Rubicam	Bunetta; Huff	2:58
22.	"Country for California"	Will Bundy; Rodney Clawson; John Morgan; Justin Wilson	Bunetta; Huff	3:37
23.	"Boots"	Rhett; Bunetta; Haas; Ryan	Bunetta; Huff; Micah Tawlks	2:25
24.	"Somethin' 'Bout a Woman"	Rhett; Bunetta; Haas; Ryan	Bunetta; Huff	3:30
25.	"What Could Go Right"	Rhett; Block; Byron; Kerr	Bunetta; Huff; Kerr	3:31
Total length:				78:21

Deluxe reissue digital bonus track
No.	Title	Writer(s)	Producer(s)	Length
1.	"Old Tricks" (featuring Niall Horan)	Rhett; Bunetta; Ryan; Beavers; Haas; Franzino	Bunetta; Huff	3:06

== Personnel ==
Musicians

- Thomas Rhett – lead vocals (all tracks), background vocals (tracks 4, 14)
- Julian Bunetta – programming (tracks 1, 3, 4, 6, 7, 10, 11, 13), background vocals (1, 2, 8, 11), drums (1, 4, 6, 8, 10), acoustic guitar (1, 4, 10), keyboards (1, 4, 11, 14), drum programming (2), bass guitar (4, 10), percussion (4), electric guitar (10)
- Charlie Handsome – acoustic guitar, bass guitar (tracks 1, 3); drum programming, electric guitar (1); drums, programming (3)
- Ilya Toshinskiy – acoustic guitar (tracks 2, 5–14)
- John Ryan – keyboards (tracks 2, 4, 7), background vocals (2, 4), drum programming (2), drums (4, 6), acoustic guitar (4, 8), bass guitar (4, 10); percussion, programming (4); electric guitar (5, 8, 13)
- Derek Wells – electric guitar (tracks 2, 5–12, 14)
- Kris Donegan – electric guitar (tracks 2, 5–8, 10, 13)
- Charlie Judge – keyboards (2, 5–8, 10, 13)
- Paul Franklin – steel guitar (tracks 2, 5–7)
- Jimmie Lee Sloas – bass guitar (tracks 2, 8, 13)
- Dann Huff – electric guitar (tracks 3, 14); banjo, mandolin (3); acoustic guitar (4)
- Whit Wright – steel guitar (3)
- John Byron – background vocals (tracks 3, 6), acoustic guitar (6)
- Joe Reeves – acoustic guitar (track 3)
- Ammo – programming (tracks 4, 7), drums (4, 11); acoustic guitar, bass guitar, keyboards, percussion (4)
- Zai1k – background vocals (track 4)
- Mark Hill – bass guitar (tracks 5–7, 9, 11, 12, 14)
- Chris Kimmerer – drums (tracks 5, 7–9, 11)
- David Huff – programming (tracks 5, 7, 8)
- Jaxson Free – drums, programming (track 6)
- Josh Reedy – background vocals (tracks 7–13)
- Mark Trussell – background vocals, electric guitar, programming, synthesizer (track 7)
- Andrew Haas – keyboards, programming (track 8)
- Alex Wright – keyboards (tracks 9, 11, 12, 14)
- Will Bundy – background vocals, electric guitar (track 9)
- Josh Kerr – acoustic guitar, drum programming, piano, synthesizer, vocal programming (track 11)
- Jerry Roe – drums (tracks 12–14)
- Micah Tawlks – electric guitar (track 12)
- Matt Dragstrem – electric guitar, piano, programming, synthesizer (track 13)

Technical

- Nathan Dantzler – mastering
- Julian Bunetta – mixing (tracks 1, 2, 5, 9, 10, 14), recording (1, 3, 4), additional engineering (1–3, 5–14)
- Jeff Gunnell – mixing (tracks 1, 2, 5, 9, 10, 14), recording (3, 4), additional engineering (1–3, 5–14)
- Alex Tumay – mixing (tracks 3, 11)
- Alex Ghenea – mixing (tracks 4, 6)
- Sean Moffitt – mixing (tracks 7, 8, 13)
- Micah Tawlks – mixing (track 12)
- Charlie Handsome – recording (track 1)
- Buckley Miller – recording (tracks 2, 5–8, 10, 13)
- Drew Bollman – recording (tracks 9, 11, 12, 14)
- David Huff – editing (tracks 5, 7, 8)
- Chris Small – editing (tracks 5, 7, 8)
- Jase Keithley – additional mixing (track 7), mixing assistance (8, 13)
- Josh Reedy – additional engineering (tracks 2, 7–13)
- Harrison Tate – mastering assistance
- Nacor Zuluaga – mixing assistance (track 3)
- Kai Tsao – mixing assistance (track 3)
- Zach Kuhlman – engineering assistance (tracks 1, 5–8, 10, 13)
- Sean Badum – engineering assistance (tracks 8, 9, 11, 12, 14)

== Charts ==
=== Weekly charts ===
Weekly chart performance for About a Woman
Chart (2024–2025)	Peak position
Australian Albums (ARIA)	96
Australian Country Albums (ARIA)	16
Canadian Albums (Billboard)	42
Scottish Albums (OCC)	40
UK Album Downloads (OCC)	38
UK Country Albums (OCC)	5
US Billboard 200	19
US Independent Albums (Billboard)	4
US Top Country Albums (Billboard)	10

=== Year-end charts ===
Year-end chart performance for About a Woman
Chart (2025)	Position
US Top Country Albums (Billboard)	35

== Certifications ==
Certifications for About a Woman
Region	Certification	Certified units/sales
United States (RIAA)	Gold	500,000^{‡}
^{‡} Sales+streaming figures based on certification alone.
