= OTT (group) =

Former Irish boyband, active in the late 1990s

- Origin: Dublin, Ireland
- Genre: Pop
- Years active: 1995–1998
- Labels: Sony, Epic
- Past members: Niall O'Neill; Glen Clarke; Adam Mates; Simon McGrath; Keith Cox

OTT (short for Over The Top) were an Irish boy band of the mid-late 1990s. The five members were Niall O'Neill, Alan Fitzsimons, Alan Mates (known as 'Adam' in the band), Glen Clarke and Keith Cox. They were signed to Sony Music and had a number of chart hits in Ireland and the UK.

== Career ==
After three top ten single releases in Ireland, the group attempted to break the UK market minus Keith Cox, who had been "sacked from the band over what Sony termed 'irreconcilable working differences'". Although moderately successful in the UK, scoring four top 30 hits, the group became well known in Asia with sales of up to 250,000 copies of their debut album. After being dropped by Sony in the late 1990s, the band broke up.

== Discography ==
=== Album ===
- 1997: This One's for You

=== Singles ===
- 1995: "Promise Me"
- 1996: "I Can't Give You Anything (But My Love)" - IRE #10
- 1996: "Let Me In" - IRE #2
- 1996: "All Out of Love" - IRE #3
- 1996: "Forever Girl" - IRE #14
- 1997: "Let Me In" (re-issue) - UK #12
- 1997: "Forever Girl" (re-issue) - UK #24
- 1997: "All Out of Love" (re-issue) - UK #11
- 1998: "The Story of Love" - UK #11, IRE #9

== After OTT ==
Fitzsimons competed in the first series of TV talent series The Voice of Ireland, being eliminated in the semi-finals. He now works in the mobile communications industry, O'Neill now runs a multi-media company in Dublin, having worked at a Spanish tourist resort, Mates is an interior designer, and Clarke lives in the United States. Cox, having left the band early on, subsequently worked for an Irish travel company and was based at a Spanish holiday resort calling bingo, performing cabaret shows and karaoke, and booking acts.
