= Em Rossi =

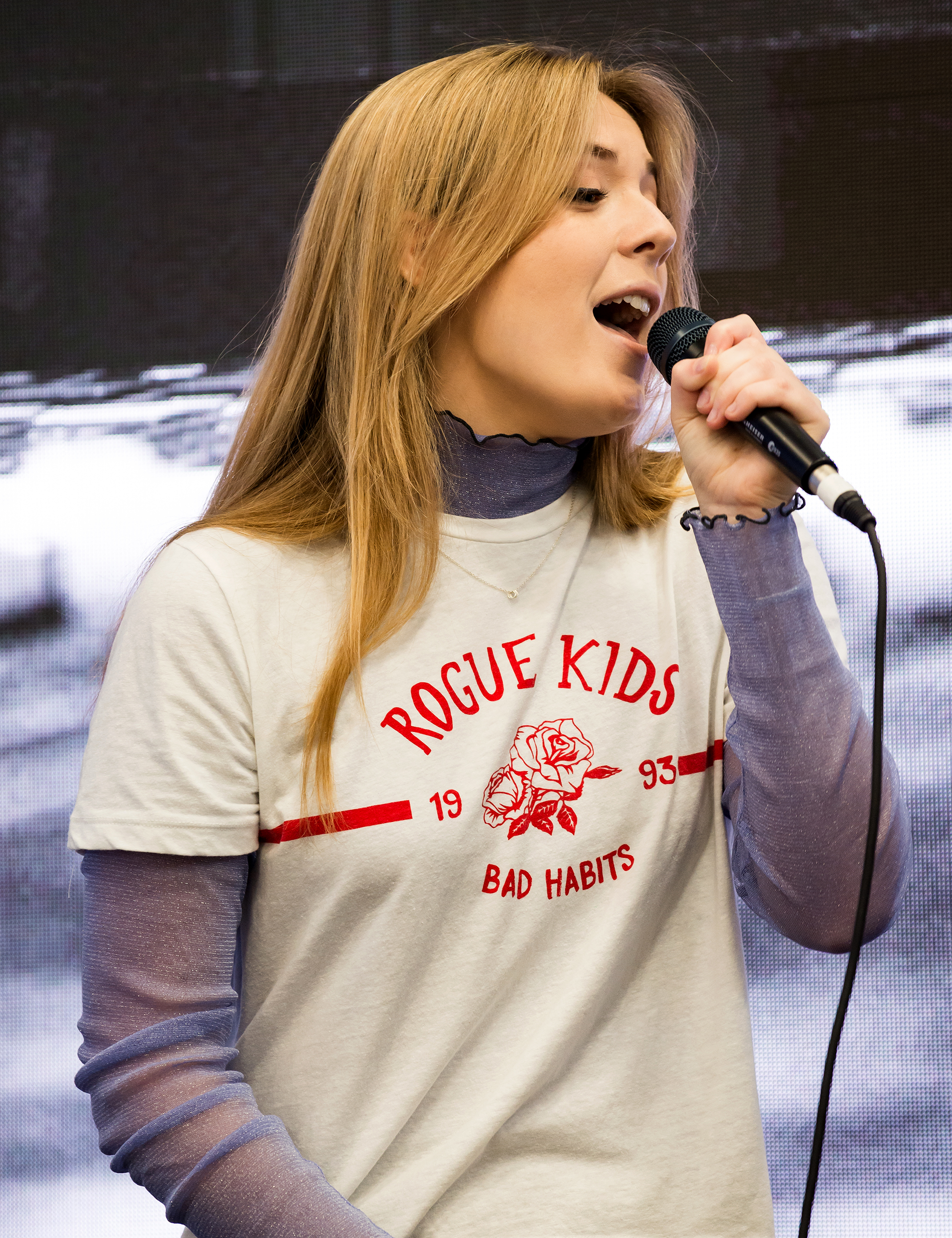
- Em Rossi in 2018

Background information
- Born: Emily Cecilia Brockman; June 26, 1998 (age 27); Petaluma, California, US
- Origin: Los Angeles, California
- Occupation(s): Singer, songwriter
- Instrument(s): Vocals, piano
- Years active: 2015–present
- Labels: Sony Music
- Website: emrossi.com

Emily Cecilia Brockman (born June 26, 1998) is an American singer-songwriter, known by her stage name Em Rossi. She began professionally recording at the age of 14.

== Biography ==
Rossi was born in Petaluma, California to Robert Brockman and Karen Rossi. Her father was an architect. At 8 years old, Rossi started taking private vocal lessons, focused on both classical as well as Broadway. Rossi cites Adele and Sara Bareilles as inspirations. At age 14, Rossi began recording songs. In 2014, her father died from a congenital heart defect. She joined producer Jim McGorman toward making a self-titled album. While attending Petaluma High School in her junior and senior years, she and her mother continued to make regular drives between Petaluma and Los Angeles to work on her singing career.

Rossi's first single was "Madness", released in the summer of 2015. She opened for The Tenors at the Willow Grove Inn in Virginia. and recorded a special called The Sessions at Willow Grove, which was broadcast on Comcast's Xfinity on Demand platform. "Madness" was also featured on in-flight programming for United Airlines and American Airlines.

In February 2016, she released the music video for her song "Earthquake," which she describes as a "slow, emotional ballad". A few days later, a house remix version of the song was created by musician Samy Zenati from Algeria. She released a music video for her song "Young Hearts" in May.

After graduating from Petaluma High School in 2016, Rossi moved to Los Angeles to pursue her music career full-time.

On December 6, 2019, Rossi announced that she had signed her first major record deal with Sony Music.

== Personal life ==
Em's mother Karen is her manager. She also has an older brother named Daniel.

== Discography ==
Singles

- "Madness" (2015)
- "Earthquake" (2016)
- "Young Hearts" (2016)
- "Empty Space" (2016)
- "No Easy Way" (2017)
- "No Longer the Same" (2018)
- "In the Middle" (2018)

== Filmography ==
- The Sessions at Willow Grove – Comcast Xfinity on Demand platform
