= Sunset Strippers =

2004–2008 British electronic music group

- Origin: Brighton, England
- Genres: House
- Years active: 2004–2008
- Past members: Harry Diamond; Sergei Forster-Hall; Kieron McTernan

Sunset Strippers were an electronic music group from the UK. They are best known for their 2005 song "Falling Stars", which samples the 1988 hit song "Waiting for a Star to Fall" by Boy Meets Girl and was involved in a sampling battle with Cabin Crew. "Falling Stars" reached number 3 on the UK Singles Chart in March 2005.

== History ==
Members Sergei Forster-Hall and Kieron McTernan met in Northbrook College.

In 2004, Sunset Strippers remixed the top 25 hit "Cry Little Sister", originally written by Gerard McMahon (under the pseudonym "Gerard McMann") as the theme tune for the film The Lost Boys. In 2005, they remixed Planet Funk's song "The Switch", which featured in Mitsubishi television advertisements, and in 2007 they remixed Irish pop band Westlife's "Total Eclipse of the Heart" for The Love Album. The group's last release under the Sunset Strippers name was "Step Right Up" in 2008, which appears on the downloadable version of Clubbers Guide '08 by Ministry of Sound.

Forster-Hall and McTernan began releasing remixes under the name My Digital Enemy in 2006, which continued until they renamed themselves MDE in 2017. They release mostly tech house and deep house music.

== "Falling Stars" music video ==
The music video for "Falling Stars" features choreographer Benji Weeratunge listening to the song in his headphones whilst washing his clothes in a launderette. Three attractive young women enter the launderette and begin to dance all at once whilst washing their clothes as well. As they wait for their clothes, the women strike poses that they coordinate with the music while Harry tries to attract their attention. The women also dance around the launderette, until they are seen wearing white shirts and red shorts. They begin dancing with Benji while he sings into a microphone. An old woman and her dog arriving at the launderette see Benji singing (in lip-sync form) inside with a mop as a microphone. It turns out that the women are only a vision from his imagination. Unimpressed, the old woman and the dog leave the launderette. Benji still continues to sing the song (in lip-sync form), even though he pretends nothing has happened.
