= Lauren Akins =

American author

- Born: Lauren Gregory; November 8, 1989 (age 36); Madison, Tennessee
- Other name: Lauren Gregory Akins
- Education: University of Tennessee
- Notable work: Live in Love: Growing Together Through Life's Changes
- Spouse: Thomas Rhett (m. 2012)
- Children: 5
- Relatives: Rhett Akins (father-in-law)
- Website: www.laurenakins.com

Lauren Akins (née Gregory; born November 8, 1989) is an American author, podcaster, and philanthropist. She is the author of Live in Love: Growing Together Through Life's Changes, which was a New York Times best seller.

== Early life ==
Akins grew up in Madison, Tennessee and attended Goodpasture Christian School. Her parents are Steve and Lisa Gregory. She has a younger sister, Macy, and a younger brother, Grayson.

Akins attended the University of Tennessee, receiving a degree in nursing.

== Career ==
Akins worked with a non-profit advocacy organization, 147 Million Orphans. She donated over $250,000 at an event for the organization in October 2016.

On May 5, 2021, Akins released her book, Live in Love: Growing Together Through Life's Changes, a memoir which she wrote with Mark Dagostino. The book is a New York Times best seller.

In May 2021, Akins released an eight-episode podcast, Live in Love with Lauren Akins, which is co-hosted by Annie F. Downs. In October 2021, season two of the podcast premiered.

In 2023, Akins released his-and-hers perfumes with Ranger Station, a fragrance house in Nashville. Half of the proceeds went to Love One International, a nonprofit in Uganda.

== Personal life ==
Akins married country musician Thomas Rhett Akins on October 12, 2012. They met in first grade and became friends in middle school before later starting to date in high school. In 2017, they announced that they were adopting a baby girl from Uganda who was born November 1, 2015, and were also expecting. Their second daughter was born on August 12, 2017. On July 23, 2019, they announced that they were expecting their third daughter. Their third daughter was born on February 10, 2020. Their fourth daughter was born on November 15, 2021. On August 26, 2025, the couple announced that they were expecting their fifth child. On February 27, 2026, the couple announced the birth of their fifth child, a son. The family lives in Nashville.

Akins is a Christian.
