= Cabin Crew =

Australian band

- Also known as: Aviators
- Origin: Sydney, Australia
- Genres: House; EDM
- Years active: 2000–present
- Labels: Vicious Vinyl/UMA; Ministry of Sound
- Members: Ben Garden; Rob Kittler

Cabin Crew, also known as Aviators, are an Australian electronic dance music duo, which consists of DJs and record producers, Ben Garden and Rob Kittler (p.k.a. RobKAY). In 2005 their remix, "Star2Fall", of Boy Meets Girl's 1988 single, "Waiting for a Star to Fall", reached the top 5 of the mainstream charts in Finland and United Kingdom.

== History ==
Cabin Crew were formed in 2000 as Aviators, a club music duo, in Sydney by Ben Garden, a producer-engineer, and Rob Kittler (p.k.a. RobKAY), a DJ-producer. The pair had met in a Canberra secondary school but attended different tertiary institutions. Garden had worked in Sydney on production and composition for TV shows since 1999. Kittler had performed in Sydney and Canberra clubs, alongside other DJs. One of their first singles was "Poison to My Mind (I Keep Movin')" (2002) by Aviators featuring Lady K, which was co-written by Garden and Kittler with Kachina Lewis (p.k.a. Lady K).

In 2003 Gardner started working on sampling, "Waiting for a Star to Fall", a 1988 single by Boy Meets Girl. Kittler remembered, "He just thought of the sample and started to play with it. We did the final mix of it in September '03, and that's pretty much the result of what people are hearing now." Despite difficulties in obtaining clearances for the sample, they heard that United Kingdom group, Sunset Strippers had also sampled the same song. Kittler continued, "we'd been trying to get our version cleared since May '04, then Sunset's version popped up. We had the green light given to us by the publishing company but we never heard back from Sony, who happened to own the master."

In November 2004 Cabin Crew issued a single, "Star to Fall" (later known as "Star2Fall"), which debuted at No. 34 on the ARIA Club Tracks chart. Sony BMG did not clear the sample for international release by the Australian duo. Instead, the label used Sunset Strippers' version. However, when Boy Meets Girl's vocalist and song writer, George Merrill, heard Cabin Crew's remix of the track, he re-recorded the vocals for them, allowing their version to be released, as "Star2Fall", in late February 2005 via Vicious Vinyl. inthemix reporter observed, "The first mix on the single is a full-on vocal assault; it's the 'Radio Mix'. It opens with a huge uplifting male echoed vocal, and a big bassline. The level of cheese here is 11/10; it's definitely cheesier than your average funky house number."

In Australia, Sunset Strippers' and Cabin Crew's singles almost simultaneously entered the ARIA Singles charts in March. "Star2Fall" peaked at No. 4 on the ARIA Club Tracks and reached the top 30 on its mainstream singles chart. Tara Thomas of Australian Recording Industry Association (ARIA), explained how, "both [groups] sampled the same original song at the same time, despite being on opposite sides of the world. Sony granted the Sunset Strippers the rights to the original and denied Cabin Crew. Then, totally out of the blue Boy Meets Girl re-recorded the vocal for Cabin Crew making it possible for our local boys to release the tune as 'Star2Fall'." In March 2005 the group were signed to Ministry of Sound for international releases. Christie Eliezer of Music & Media described how Vicious Vinyl had released, "a press statement to counteract rumours about the track. It has no issues with uncleared samples, and has the blessing of the song's writers."

On 28 February 2008, Cabin Crew released "Can't Stop It" on CD-Maxi (CDS/CDM), 12" Vinyl (EP), and digital formats under the Vicious Vinyl label. The Mind Electric mix appeared on the various artists album, Vicious Cuts Summer 2008.

== Discography ==
=== Singles ===
Year	Title	Chart positions									
Year	Title	AUS	BEL	EUR	FIN	GER	IRE	ITA	NED	SCO	UK
2005	"Star2Fall"	25	37	16	4	35	13	31	15	3	4
2008	"Can't Stop It"	— (Note: "Can't Stop It (Mind Electric / Aviators / Kaskade / Club mix)" did not enter the ARIA Top 50 Singles Chart, but peaked at number 8 on the ARIA Club Tracks chart.)	—	—	—	—	—	—	—	—	—

Notes

Cabin Crew's "Finally in Calabria" / "She Wants to House" 12" vinyl
