= Arif Mardin =

Turkish-American music producer (1932–2006)

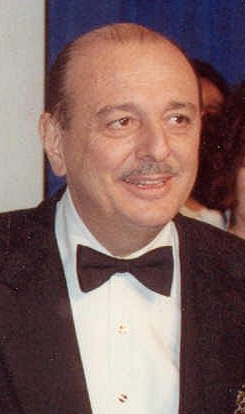
- Mardin at the Grammy Awards in 1990

Background information
- Born: March 15, 1932; Istanbul, Turkey
- Died: June 25, 2006 (aged 74) New York City, U.S.
- Genre: Jazz
- Occupations: Music producer; arranger
- Instrument: Keyboards
- Years active: 1960s–2006
- Labels: Atlantic; Manhattan

Mehmet Arif Mardin (March 15, 1932 – June 25, 2006) was a Turkish-American music producer, who worked with hundreds of artists across many different styles of music, including jazz, rock, soul, disco and country. He worked at Atlantic Records for over 30 years, as producer, arranger, studio manager, and vice president, before moving to EMI and serving as vice president and general manager of Manhattan Records.

Mardin worked with artists including the Rascals, Queen, Melissa Manchester, John Prine, the Bee Gees, Hall & Oates, Anita Baker, Aretha Franklin, Dionne Warwick, Donny Hathaway, Roberta Flack, Bette Midler, Michael Crawford, Chaka Khan, Gordon Haskell , Howard Jones, Laura Nyro, Ringo Starr, Carly Simon, Phil Collins, Daniel Rodriguez, and Norah Jones. Mardin was awarded 12 Grammy Awards and has 18 nominations.

== Biography ==
=== Early life ===
Mardin was born in Istanbul into a renowned family that included statesmen, diplomats and leaders in the civic, military and business sectors of the Ottoman Empire and the Turkish Republic. His father was co-owner in a petroleum gas station chain.

Mardin grew up listening to the likes of Bing Crosby and Glenn Miller. Through his sister he met jazz critic Cuneyt Sermet, who turned him onto this music and eventually became his mentor. After graduating from Istanbul University in Economics and Commerce, Mardin studied at the London School of Economics. Influenced by his sister's music records and jazz, he was also an accomplished orchestrator and arranger, but he never intended to pursue a career in music.

However, his fate changed in 1956 after meeting the American jazz musicians Dizzy Gillespie and Quincy Jones at a concert in Ankara. He sent three demo compositions to his friend Tahir Sur who worked at a radio station in the United States. Sur took these compositions to Quincy Jones and Mardin became the first recipient of the Quincy Jones Scholarship at the Berklee College of Music in Boston. In 1958 he and his fiancé Latife moved from Istanbul to Boston. After graduating in 1961, he taught at Berklee for one year and then moved to New York City to try his luck. Arif Mardin was later made a trustee of Berklee and was awarded an honorary doctorate.

=== Career ===
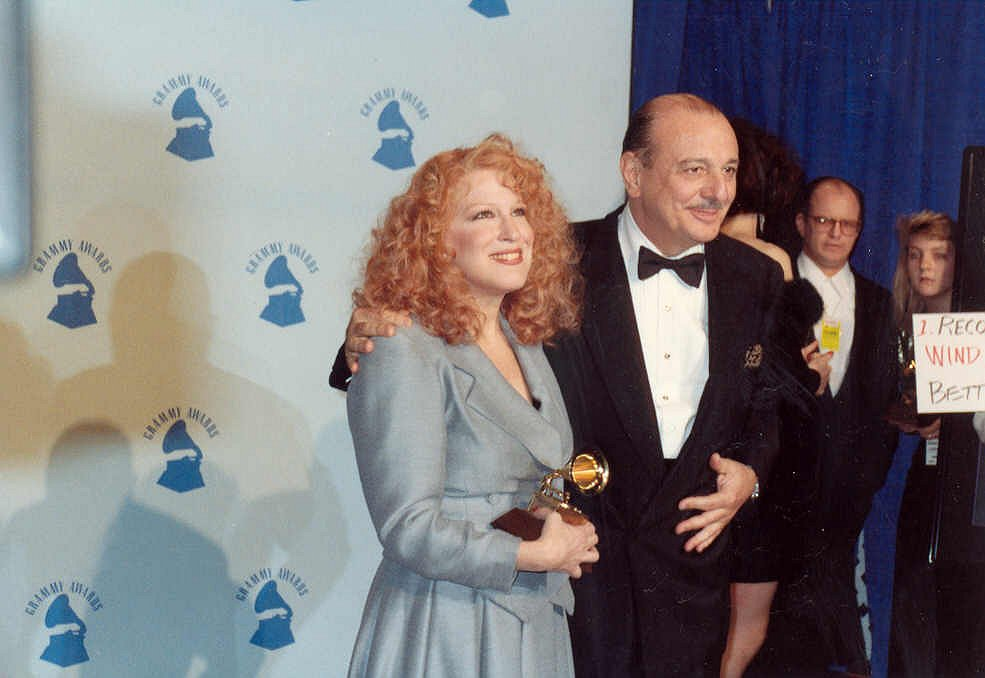
Arif Mardin and Bette Midler at the 32nd Grammy Awards

Mardin began his career at Atlantic Records in 1963 as an assistant to Nesuhi Ertegün. A fellow Turkish émigré, Nesuhi was the brother of Ahmet Ertegün, Atlantic's co-founder and a jazz enthusiast when they met at the Newport Jazz Festival. Mardin rose through the ranks quickly, becoming studio manager, label house producer and arranger. In 1969, he became the Vice President and later served as Senior Vice President until 2001. He worked closely on many projects with co-founders Ertegün and Jerry Wexler, as well as noted recording engineer Tom Dowd; the three legends (Dowd, Mardin, and Wexler) were responsible for establishing the "Atlantic Sound". Arif Mardin retired from Atlantic Records in May 2001 and re-activated his label Manhattan Records. He maintained ties to the Turkish music industry.

He produced many hit artists including Margie Joseph, Thereza Bazar, The Rascals, Carly Simon, Petula Clark, Bette Midler, Barbra Streisand, Cher, the Bee Gees, Diana Ross, Patti LaBelle, Aretha Franklin, Lulu, Anita Baker, Judy Collins, Phil Collins, Scritti Politti, Culture Club, Roberta Flack, Average White Band, Hall & Oates, Donny Hathaway, Jeffrey Osborne, Howard Jones, Norah Jones, Daniel Rodriguez, Chaka Khan, George Benson, Melissa Manchester, The Manhattan Transfer, Modern Jazz Quartet, Willie Nelson, John Prine, Leo Sayer, Dusty Springfield, David Bowie, Jewel and Ringo Starr.

Mardin is listed on Stephen Stills' first album (1970) issued by Atlantic Records, as a contributing artist for string arrangement on the songs "Church" and "To a Flame".

Arif Mardin, when producing the Bee Gees' 1975 Main Course album track "Nights on Broadway" discovered the distinctive falsetto of Barry Gibb, which became a familiar trademark of the band throughout the disco era.

Mardin made three solo albums: Glass Onion, in 1970, Journey, in 1975, and All My Friends Are Here, in 2006. In Journey, he was the composer and arranger, but he also played electric piano and percussion, and was accompanied by many stars of jazz (Randy and Michael Brecker, Joe Farrell, Gary Burton, Ron Carter, Steve Gadd, Billy Cobham and many others). Mardin composed, arranged, conducted and produced The Prophet, an interpretation of The Prophet by Kahlil Gibran, in 1974, featuring Richard Harris.

In his career of more than 40 years, he collected over 40 gold and platinum albums, over 15 Grammy nominations and 12 Grammy Awards. In 1990, Arif Mardin was inducted into the National Academy of Recording Arts and Sciences Hall of Fame.

=== All My Friends Are Here ===
Mardin considered All My Friends Are Here his life's work. He wrote or co-wrote all but one of the 13 tracks. The album features performances by Bette Midler, Chaka Khan, David Sanborn, Norah Jones, Carly Simon, Phil Collins, among the artists whom he produced over the years. Recording sessions and interviews were filmed for the companion documentary The Greatest Ears in Town: The Arif Mardin Story.

No.	Title	Writer(s)	Artist	Length
1.	"The Greatest Ears in Town"	Bette Midler, Marc Shaiman	Arif Mardin feat. Bette Midler & Barry Gibb	4:40
2.	"So Blue"	Arif Mardin, Roxanne Seeman	Arif Mardin feat. Chaka Khan & David Sanborn	4:58
3.	"No Way Out"	Arif Mardin	Arif Mardin feat. Nicki Parrot	5:31
4.	"Goodbye to Rio"	Arif Mardin	Arif Mardin feat. Raul Midon	4:15
5.	"No One"	Margo Guryan, Arif Mardin	Arif Mardin feat. Dianne Reeves	3:21
6.	"So Many Nights"	Arif Mardin	Arif Mardin feat. Danny O'Keefe	4:13
7.	"Calls a Soft Voice"	Arif Mardin	Arif Mardin feat. Carly Simon	5:41
8.	"Longing for You"	Arif Mardin, Michael Margulies	Arif Mardin feat. Norah Jones	6:49
9.	"Dual Blues"	Arif Mardin	Arif Mardin feat. Amy Kohn	5:31
10.	"Chez Twang’s"	Arif Mardin	Arif Mardin feat. Dr. John	5:38
11.	"Willie’s After Hours (Lone Star Blues)"	Arif Mardin	Arif Mardin feat. Willie Nelson & Katreese Barnes	5:58
12.	"All My Friends Are Here"	Arif Mardin	Arif Mardin feat. Members of the Average White Band, The Bee Gees and the Rascals, Phil Collins, Hall & Oates, Lalah Hathaway, Boy Meets Girl & Randy Brecker	4:32
13.	"Wistful"	Arif Mardin	Arif Mardin	1:25

== The Greatest Ears in Town: The Arif Mardin Story ==
His son, Joe, created a documentary about his father called The Greatest Ears in Town: The Arif Mardin Story which was released on June 15, 2010. The documentary was directed by Doug Biro. It was premiered at several screenings at different chapters of The Recording Academy. The first screening took place in New York on June 15, 2010.

== Awards ==
=== Grammy Awards ===
Year	Category	Work	Result
1976	Producer of the Year, Non-Classical	Himself	Won
1979	Album of the Year	Saturday Night Fever	Won
1982	Producer of the Year, Non-Classical	Himself	Nominated
1982	Best Instrumental Arrangement Accompanying Vocal(s)	"And The Melody Still Lingers On (Night In Tunisia)"	Nominated
1984	Best Instrumental Arrangement Accompanying Vocal(s)	"Be Bop Medley"	Nominated
1984	Best Vocal Arrangement for Two or More Voices	"Be Bop Medley"	Won
1985	Best Instrumental Arrangement Accompanying	"I Feel For You"	Nominated
1990	Record of the Year	"Wind Beneath My Wings"	Won
1991	Record of the Year	"From A Distance"	Nominated
1991	Producer of the Year, Non-Classical	Himself	Nominated
1993	Best Album Notes	Queen of Soul: The Atlantic Recordings	Won
1994	Best Arrangement On An Instrumental	"Suite Fraternidad (1st and Second Movements)"	Nominated
1996	Best Musical Show Album	Smokey Joe's Cafe: The Songs Of Leiber And Stoller	Won
1997	Best Musical Show Album	Rent	Nominated
1998	Best Instrumental Arrangement Accompanying Vocal(s)	"Laura"	Nominated
2003	Producer of the Year, Non-Classical	Himself	Won
2003	Best Pop Vocal Album	Come Away with Me	Won
2003	Album of the Year	Come Away with Me	Won
2003	Record of the Year	"Don't Know Why"	Won
2004	Best Jazz Vocal Album	A Little Moonlight	Won

=== Miscellaneous Honors ===
Year	Organization	Category	Work	Result
2001	Boston Music Awards	Ertegün Impact Award	Himself	Honored
2001	The Recording Academy	Grammy Trustees Award	Himself	Honored
2001	Nordoff-Robbins Music Foundation	Man of the Year	Himself	Honored
2003	Istanbul Jazz Festival	Lifetime Achievement Award	Himself	Honored
2026	Rock and Roll Hall of Fame	Award for Musical Excellence	Himself	Inducted

== Personal life ==
He came to the United States in 1958 with his wife, Latife Mardin, who was a playwright and translator. They had three children: Nazan Joffre, Joe Mardin and Julie Mardin.

== Death ==
Mardin died at his home in New York on June 25, 2006, following a lengthy battle with pancreatic cancer. His remains were brought to Turkey and were interred at Karacaahmet Cemetery in Üsküdar district of Istanbul on July 5, 2006. Bee Gees' soloist Robin Gibb and his wife Dwina attended the funeral service, among other prominent people.

Ahmet Necdet Sezer, the Turkish president, said in a statement: “I was deeply saddened by the death of Arif Mardin, who is considered to be one of the most important music producers of the 20th century. He will always be respectfully remembered as a person who made our nation proud.”

Ahmet Ertegün, Founder of Atlantic Records and former chairman of The American Turkish Society remarked "Arif Mardin has been one of the most prolific board members of The American Turkish Society and a great friend. We are deeply grateful for his service."

A memorial tribute to Mardin was held at Alice Tully Hall in New York City on March 6, 2007.

== See also ==
- Category: Albums produced by Arif Mardin
