= Amy Kohn =

American musician (born 1972)

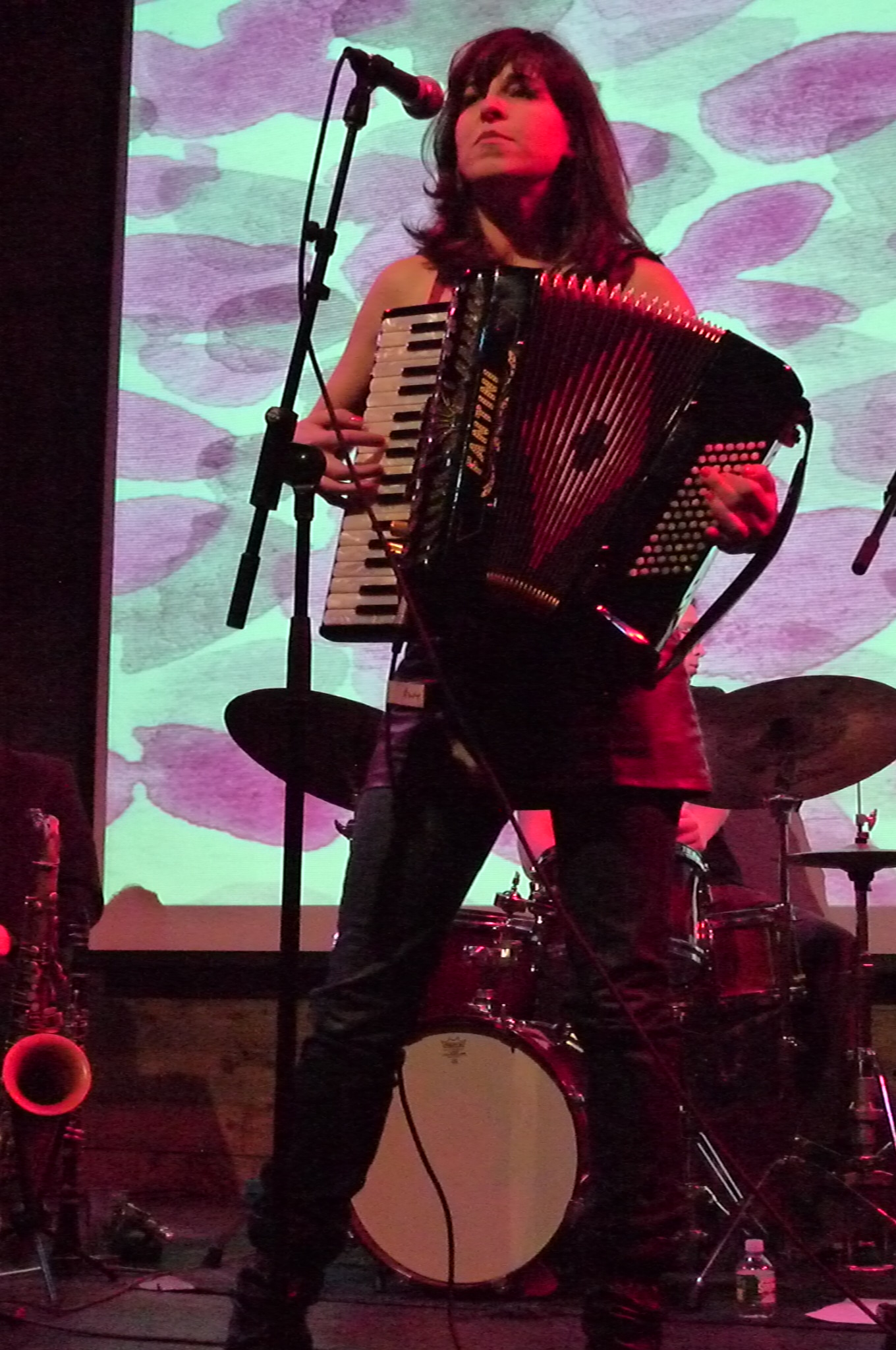
- Amy Kohn on accordion during a performance of the Amy Kohn Band at Galapagos Art Space in New York City (January 2009).

Background information
- Born: June 5, 1972 (age 54)
- Origin: Chicago, Illinois, U.S.
- Instruments: Piano, accordion, vocals
- Years active: 1998–present
- Labels: NuNoise Records, Amymusic
- Website: www.amykohn.com

Amy Kohn (born June 5, 1972) is an American composer, lyricist, singer, pianist, and accordionist.

== Early life and education ==
Born in Chicago, she studied at Oberlin College and Conservatory of Music in Ohio and New York University Graduate Musical Theater Writing Program. The final thesis for her master's degree was her chamber-opera 1 Plum Sq, which was later produced and broadcast in 2005 on WNYC as part of their American Music Festival.

== Career ==
In New York City Amy Kohn met the legendary producer Arif Mardin who dubbed her a "Musical Devil in a Red Dress" and chose Amy as a featured singer and accordionist on his last effort: an album of songs written by Mardin himself and produced in the last year of his life. Also featured on this album are artists such as Norah Jones, Phil Collins, Raul Midón and Dianne Reeves.

She co-produced her album I’m in Crinoline (2006) with Arif's son Joe Mardin of NuNoise Records.

She lives in New York where she is the leader of her 7-piece band (the Amy Kohn Band).

Outside of the United States she has performed her music in European festivals (such as the Edinburgh's Fringe Festival, Woma Jazz and UBI Jazz in Italy and Festival of Performing Arts in Pula, Croatia) and in tandem with the Italian pianist and singer Debora Petrina in the project Naked (NienteAltroKEDonne).

Her music was also transmitted on many European radio stations (such as the UK's BBC Radio 3, BBC 6 Music and Resonance FM and Concertzender in the Netherlands).

She has worked on commissions from the string quartet Ethel of New York City, for pianist Guy Livingston (DVD: One Minute More) and for the children's theater company I Fantaghirò of Padua, Italy.

== Discography ==
=== Albums ===
- The Glass Laughs Back (1999)
- I’m in Crinoline (2006)
- PlexiLusso (2014)
