= Boy Meets Girl (band) =

American adult contemporary music band

- Origin: Seattle, Washington, U.S.
- Genres: Pop rock, adult contemporary
- Years active: 1982–present
- Labels: A&M, RCA, Boy Meets Girl
- Members: George Merrill; Shannon Rubicam
- Website: www.boymeetsgirlmusic.com

Boy Meets Girl is an American pop rock-music duo consisting of keyboardist and vocalist George Merrill and singer Shannon Rubicam. They are best known for their hit song "Waiting for a Star to Fall" from 1988 and for writing two of Whitney Houston's number one hits: "How Will I Know" and "I Wanna Dance with Somebody (Who Loves Me)".

== Career ==
The members of Boy Meets Girl, George Merrill and Shannon Rubicam, wrote and composed a number of songs for other artists. Most famous are their two number one hits written for Whitney Houston, "How Will I Know" and "I Wanna Dance with Somebody (Who Loves Me)". They also wrote the songs "Don't Tell Me We Have Nothing" and "Haunting Me" for Deniece Williams and the song "I Know You By Heart", which was recorded by Dolly Parton and Smokey Robinson for Parton's 1987 Rainbow album, and later covered by Bette Midler for the Beaches soundtrack. The duo also performed backing vocals on Williams' number one hit, "Let's Hear It for the Boy". Merrill also sang backing vocals on Bette Midler's Some People's Lives album.

Boy Meets Girl usually produced a demo version, or, in some cases such as "Don't Tell Me We Have Nothing", a studio version, before Merrill and Rubicam handed the songs to the intended artists.

The duo's first album as a recording act was self titled, and its lead-off song, "Oh Girl", a bitter tale of a failed relationship was released as a single by A&M Records. The song reached number 39 on the Billboard Hot 100 singles chart in May 1985. The Boy Meets Girl album peaked at number 76 on the album chart.

Three years later, the group released its follow-up album, Reel Life, which featured the single "Waiting for a Star to Fall". With this selection, after years of writing and composing songs for other artists, the duo earned mainstream success in their own right. In the United States, "Waiting for a Star to Fall" peaked at number 5 on the Billboard Hot 100 and at number 1 on the Billboard Adult Contemporary chart. The song reached number 9 in the UK Singles Chart and was also a top 40 Australian hit in April 1989. It was featured in the 1990 movie Three Men and a Little Lady. The song was inspired by an actual falling star that Rubicam had seen at one of Whitney Houston's concerts at the Greek Theatre. The duo submitted the song to Houston for consideration on her next album, but her A&R at the time, Clive Davis, rejected it.

Boy Meets Girl's follow-up single "Bring Down the Moon" peaked at No. 49 on the Billboard Hot 100 (and No. 28 Adult Contemporary). Reel Life contained both singles and spent several weeks at No. 50 in the United States and peaked at No. 74 in the United Kingdom.

Boy Meets Girl's third album, New Dream, was released in the UK & Europe in 1990, but RCA Records chose not release it in the US during their label reorganization. It was finally remastered and released in 2005.

In the early 2000s, the couple, who had married during the 1980s, divorced, but continued their musical collaboration. In 2003, they released their fourth album, The Wonderground, on their own label, and arranged for RCA Records to re-release their two RCA albums. Their debut album recorded for A&M Records was also re-released. The limited-release various artists album Number One With a Bullet also contains their original demo tape for "I Wanna Dance with Somebody (Who Loves Me)".

In 2005, "Waiting for a Star to Fall" was involved in a "sample battle". Two electronic music groups, Cabin Crew and Sunset Strippers, wanted to sample the song and remix it. Sunset Strippers, from the UK, won the right for the samples from the band's record label, releasing "Falling Stars". However, Cabin Crew, from Australia, and vocalist George Merrill re-recorded the vocals for the remixed song, entitled "Star to Fall" or "Star2Fall". A year earlier, Scottish electronic musician Mylo had also used samples of the song, mixing it with Kim Carnes's cover of "Bette Davis Eyes", for his song entitled "In My Arms".

Other hits using samples of their songs include Billboard Hot 100 #1 hit "Somebody" by Natalie La Rose & Jeremih, "If You Really Love Me (How Will I Know)" by David Guetta, MistaJam, and John Newman, and "Dance with You" by Laura Marano & Grey. Songwriting for other artists continued through the years including the OTT single "The Story Of Love" which reached #11 on the Official Charts from their album.

Boy Meets Girl released the band's fifth album project, entitled 5, in 2021 and soon after, the accompanying Five (Deluxe Version) released in 2022. In 2024, came the singles "Falling Hard (Loko Velocet Remix)", "The Wonderground" by Hopkinson & Boy Meets Girl, and "We The People". They began the release of a string of songs as part of an unnamed new music project in late 2026.

Merrill & Rubicam were also included in the 2027 class of nominees for the Songwriters Hall of Fame.

== Discography ==
=== Studio albums ===
Title	Album details
Boy Meets Girl	Release date: April 15, 1985; Label: A&M Records
Reel Life	Release date: November 18, 1988; Label: RCA Records
New Dream	Release date: June 1, 1990; Label: RCA Records
The Wonderground	Release date: January 17, 2003; Label: Boy Meets Girl Music
Five	Release date: March 5, 2021; Label: Boy Meets Girl Music
Five (Deluxe Edition)	Release date: December 2, 2022; Label: Boy Meets Girl Music

=== Singles ===
Year	Song	Peak chart positions				Certifications	Album
Year	Song	US	US AC	AUS	UK	Certifications	Album
1985	"Oh Girl"	39	—	—	—		Boy Meets Girl
1985	"The Touch"	—	—	—	—		Boy Meets Girl
1986	"Heartbreaker"	—	—	—	—		Single only
1988	"Waiting for a Star to Fall"	5	1	35	9	BPI: Gold	Reel Life
1989	"Bring Down the Moon"	49	28	—	92		Reel Life
1989	"Stormy Love"	—	—	—	—		Reel Life
1991	"Waiting for a Star to Fall" (re-issue)	—	—	—	76		Reel Life
2021	"More Deeply (In Love with You)"	—	—	—	—		Five
2021	"Falling Hard"	—	—	—	—		Five
2021	"Gone"	—	—	—	—		Five
2022	"Stars Are Falling"	—	—	—	—		Single only
2022	"How Will I Know (Martini Mix)"	—	—	—	—		Five (Deluxe Edition)
2024	"We the People"	—	—	—	—		Singles only
2025	"For a Star to Fall" (with Bingo Players and Disco Fries)	—	—	—	—		Singles only
2026	"Elemental"	—	—	—	—		
