= Kevin McKay (musician) =

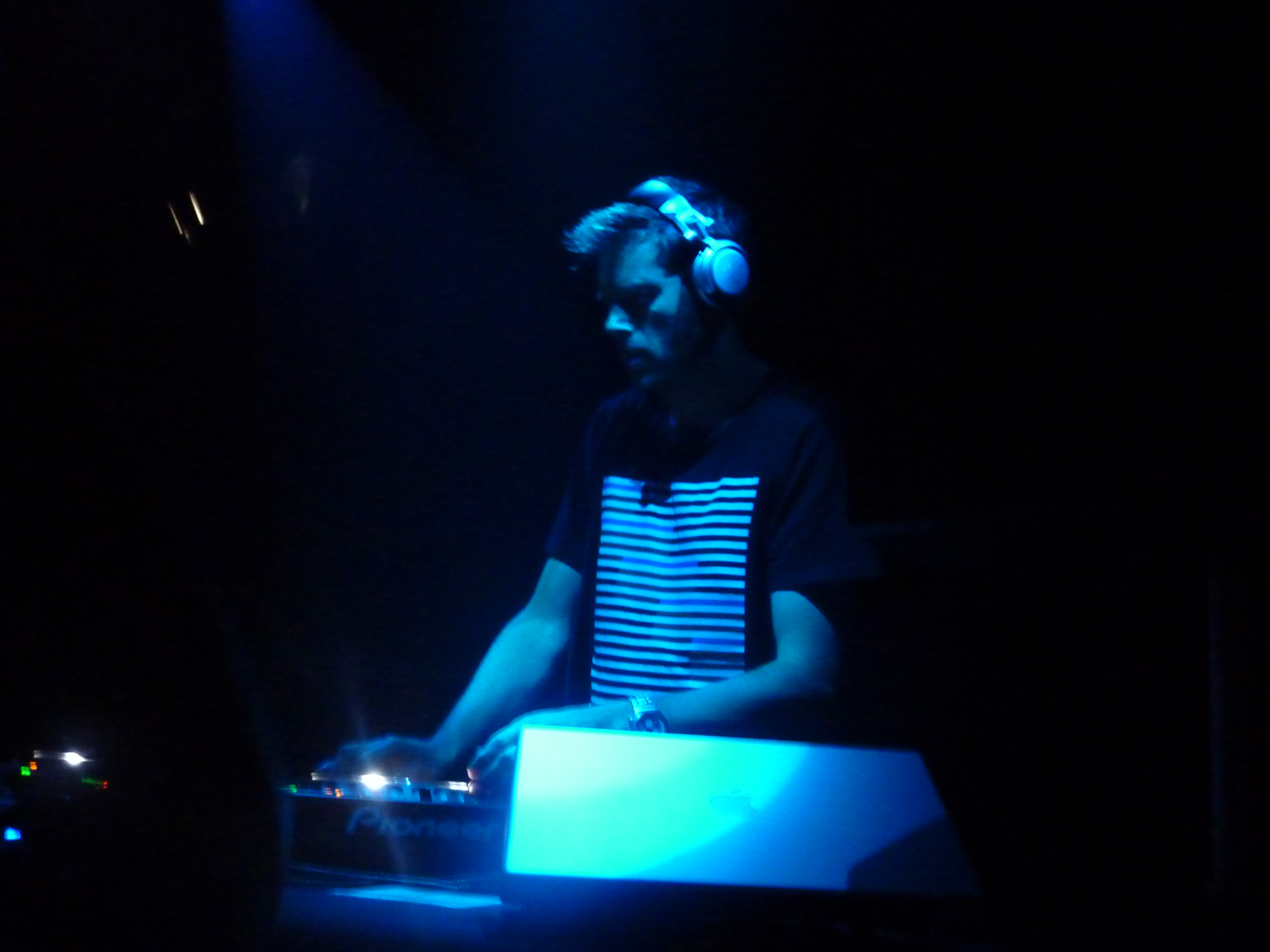
- Kevin McKay DJing @ Propagnda Moscow, August 2012

Background information
- Occupations: DJ, producer, record label owner, remixer
- Instrument: Keyboards
- Years active: 1993–present
- Labels: Glasgow Underground Recordings, Heartbeats, Breastfed
- Website: kevinmckay.co.uk

Kevin McKay (born 24 May) is a Scottish DJ, music producer, record label owner and music historian now based in London.

== History ==
McKay studied at The University of Strathclyde from 1989 to 1995. One night in 1991 while DJing at the university's student union, he met Andy Carrick. The pair subsequently began collaborating on music together. Three years later McKay secured £2000 of funding from The Princes' Trust to release their music on his Muzique Tropique imprint. McKay continued to DJ in Glasgow throughout the '90s and 2000s, holding residencies at clubs like Sub Club, The Tunnel, The Voodoo Room and The Apartment, promoting parties and inviting DJs like Francois Kevorkian, Roger Sanchez and Deep Dish to Glasgow.

In 1997, McKay founded Glasgow Underground Recordings. In the early days, the label released music by Romanthony, DJ Sneak, Ashley Beedle, Milton Jackson, Mateo and Matos, Jersey Street as well as productions by McKay himself. Since its relaunch in 2011, the label has featured artists such as Basement Jaxx, Camelphat, Claptone, Danny Howard, Dixon, Illyus & Barrientos, Mihalas Safras, Kaz James, Flashmob and Optimo.

In 2001, McKay began working with Duncan Reid, a club promoter from Glasgow, who had previously hired him to DJ at The Tunnel. Reid was recording music as Linus Loves. McKay initially signed a track of Reid's to Glasgow Underground.

In 2002, McKay met Myles Macinnes better known by the stage name Mylo, founded Breastfed, a record label and publishing company, and signed Macinnes to it. In the same year, he began producing the Linus Loves releases.

In 2003, McKay produced and mixed the Linus Loves single "Stand Back" (on this occasion recording under the pseudonym Brian Warner). It is a cover version of the 1983 Stevie Nicks song. The track peaked at No. 31 on the UK singles chart in November 2003. McKay produced all of the Linus Loves output from 2002 to 2005.

Between 2004 and 2006 using the pseudonym Kevin Kennedy, McKay co-produced and mixed all of the Mylo material released on the Breastfed label including the UK-platinum album Destroy Rock & Roll, the UK #3 hit "Doctor Pressure" and UK top-40 singles "Drop the Pressure", "In My Arms", "Muscle Car" and "Destroy Rock & Roll". As well as his A&R and production work on the album, McKay was also responsible for running the label, managing all the UK releases and worldwide licensing. As such, he secured a joint-venture deal with Sony and a publishing administration deal for Mylo with Universal Music Publishing.

In 2008, McKay signed Grum and a year later set up the Heartbeats imprint to release his music. Alongside Grum's manager, McKay A&R'd the album Heartbeats and all Grum's singles on the Heartbeats label from 2008 to 2014. As with Mylo, McKay ran the label, managing all the UK releases and worldwide licensing.

In 2011, McKay re-launched Glasgow Underground Recordings. The label had been largely inactive since 2004. After years of collaborating and producing for others, McKay began concentrating on his solo work. His Club World EP was his first release under his own name since 2001's "Freak Action". Andrew Rafter of harderbloggerfaster.com described those releases in 2011 as "warm, perfectly executed house." McKay's remix of Romanthony's "The Wanderer" reached number 14 on Music Week's Cool Cuts chart on 19 May 2011 and was described as a "brilliant rework".

In 2013, McKay entered the Beatport charts for the first time with his single "Ease Your Pain" on Stefano Ritteri's Congaloid label. The track peaked at number 23 on the Deep House chart.

In 2014, McKay released "Goin' Freak" on the Berlin-based label OFF Recordings. The single was supported on BBC Radio 1 by Pete Tong and reached number 4 on the DMC Buzz Chart and number 42 on the Beatport Tech House chart. At the end of the same year, McKay began a collaboration with Toolroom Records. Their first release together was a compilation of Glasgow Underground's releases from 2014. As well as this, McKay released singles on Exploited and Noir.

In 2015, McKay continued to collaborate with Toolroom Records, releasing the single "Check It" that peaked at number 49 on the Beatport Deep House chart and a further 5 albums including a retrospective of Glasgow Underground's catalogue from 1997 to 2007, a best-of for the year and compilations celebrating the annual dance music events in Miami, Ibiza and Amsterdam.

In 2016, McKay returned to Glasgow Underground with the single releases "What You Gonna Do", "What U Want", "Balance Work" and "The Oooh Song". McKay continued to have his music supported on BBC Radio 1 with Annie Mac playing "What U Want", Pete Tong playing "Balance Work" and Monki playing "The Oooh Song". After two years of featuring in the charts on the DJ download stores, 2016 was the year McKay reached the top of the charts with "The Oooh Song" reaching number 1 on Traxsource.com in May. Both it and "What U Want" featured in the Traxsource Hype Chart for the year.

2017 saw McKay continue to expand the genres he produced releasing progressive house (two singles with Grum, "Shooting Star" and "Dark Train" - both peaking at numbers 9 and 11 respectively on the Beatport Progressive House charts) as well as creating the genre-themed mix albums Callisto and Callisto Volume 2 for Glasgow Underground. In addition to this style, he also released house ("Get a Room", "Crazy About You", "Everybody Get on the Floor", "You Got Me Down", "The Beat Goes On") and nu-disco ("Love Forever"). As well as singles, McKay released his first solo album, The Love Forever on his own label, a move that prompted Mixmag to hail his Glasgow Underground imprint "a haven for great house music." He also featured in the end-of-year charts at Traxsource with the site naming him #19 in their top 100 house producers of 2017.

In 2018, McKay focused on his house sound. His releases were now regularly featuring in the Beatport House charts and with "Get Get Down" (his and Matt Fontaine's version of the 1999 single by Paul Johnson), he began entering the Beatport main chart. He also hit the main chart with his remix of Start the Party's version of the Donna Summer classic "I Feel Love", a release that was supported by international DJs like Monki and Carl Cox. His releases continued to be successful on Traxsource; his collaboration with CASSIMM, "Love on My Mind", reached the #1 spot in May. His previous support at BBC Radio 1 continued with DJs Annie Mac, Pete Tong, Danny Howard and Monki all supporting his releases. In addition to his own work, Glasgow Underground's releases were also featuring on the Beatport charts and in May they scored their first Beatport number one with Andrew Meller's version of "Born Slippy". Shortly afterwards, they were to become only the second label in the store's history to command both the #1 and #2 spots on the chart when PAX's "Electric Feel" joined Andrew Meller at the top in June. Meller's release would go on to be the store's #3 best-selling track of 2018.

The success of his recent house releases meant that by early 2019, the Beatport measuring site Beatstats.com rated McKay as the #2 house producer, worldwide, for the previous 12 months.

== Discography ==
Albums (as Kevin McKay)
Year	Title	Label
2018	The Love Forever	Glasgow Underground
2019	No Samples Were Harmed in the Making of This Record	Glasgow Underground

Singles (as Kevin McKay)
Year	Title	Label	Peak Chart Position (Beatport)
1999	Don't Turn Your Back on Me	Under The Counter	n/a
2001	Freak Action	Under The Counter	n/a
2011	Club World Ep	Glasgow Underground	
2011	Witness The Deepness (with Phil Kelsey)	Glasgow Underground	
2012	The Rushes	Glasgow Underground	
2013	The Best Things in Life Are Free (with Phil Kelsey)	Glasgow Underground	
2013	Body Talk (Grum Remix)	Glasgow Underground	
2013	Ease Your Pain	Congaloid	23 (Deep House)
2014	Goin' Freak	OFF Spin	42 (Tech House)
2014	Club Trax (Original Mix)	OFF Spin	87 (Tech House)
2014	Club Trax (Brett Gould Remix)	OFF Spin	27 (Deep House)
2014	Everything's A Dream	Exploited	
2014	Handz Clappin'	Noir	
2015	Check It	Toolroom	49 (Deep House)
2016	What You Gonna Do	Glasgow Underground	90 (Techno)
2016	What U Want	Glasgow Underground	
2016	Balance Work	Glasgow Underground	
2016	The Oooh Song	Glasgow Underground	
2017	Shooting Star (with Grum)	Glasgow Underground	9 (Progressive House)
2017	Get A Room	Glasgow Underground	54 (House)
2017	The Love Forever	Glasgow Underground	34 (Indie Dance/Nu-disco)
2017	Dark Train (with Grum)	Glasgow Underground	11 (Progressive House)
2017	Crazy About You	Glasgow Underground	80 (House)
2017	Everybody Get on the Floor	Glasgow Underground	49 (House)
2017	You Got Me Down	Glasgow Underground	50 (House)
2017	Losing You (with Marco Anzalone)	Glasgow Underground	61 (House)
2017	The Beat Goes On (with Marco Anzalone)	Mother Recordings	21 (House)
2018	Freaky Dancers (featuring Romanthony)	Glasgow Underground	37 (House)
2018	Time Keeps on Slippin'	Monoside	
2018	Schoolyard Daze	Nervous Records	62 (House)
2018	Greece 2000 (with Trilucid)	Glasgow Underground	18 (Melodic House & Techno)
2018	The Oooh Song (Remixes)	Glasgow Underground	
2018	Love on My Mind (with CASSIMM)	Glasgow Underground	13 (House)
2018	Get Get Down (with Matt Fontaine)	Glasgow Underground	3 (House), 14 (Main Chart)
2018	Save Me (with CASSIMM)	Glasgow Underground	17 (House)
2018	Get on the Floor And Dance (with CASSIMM)	Glasgow Underground	75 (House)
2018	Crazy About You (Club Mix)	Glasgow Underground	27 (House)
2018	Delta House Blues (with Unorthodox)	Glasgow Underground	12 (House)
2018	Love Rights	Glasgow Underground	25 (House)
2018	4 Ur Love	Glasgow Underground	44 (House)
2019	Move Your Body (Elevation)	Glasgow Underground	11 (House), 77 (Main Chart)
2019	The Way	Glasgow Underground	38 (House)
2019	Raw Beat (with CASSIMM)	Rawsome Recordings	32 (Tech House)
2019	Bram Stoker (with Joshwa (UK))	Glasgow Underground	11 (House)
2019	Feel It	Glasgow Underground	23 (House)
2019	Such A Good Feeling (with Joshwa (UK))	Glasgow Underground	14 (House)
2019	Come Together (with Alaia & Gallo)	Glasgow Underground	67 (House)
2019	Hallelujah (with David Penn)	Glasgow Underground	24 (House)
2019	Fever Called Love	Glasgow Underground	67
2019	Technologic (with Marco Anzalone)	Glasgow Underground	17 (Tech House), 71 (Main Chart)
2019	Hold Me Closer	Glasgow Underground	71 (House)
2019	What About Us (with Disaia)	Glasgow Underground	22 (House)
2025	Work (with R3hab, Pupa Nas T and Skytech featuring Denise Belfon and Fideles)	Glasgow Underground	

Remixes (as Kevin McKay)
Year	Artist	Title	Label	Peak Chart Position (Beatport)
1998	Andy Carrick	Freak Vibrations (Kevin's Freaky Groove)	Glasgow Underground	n/a
1998	LHK Productions	Let's Keep It Together (Kevin's Dirty Groove)	Glasgow Underground	n/a
1999	Airfix	Stir Fry (D&K's Skansen Anthem Mix)	Glasgow Underground	n/a
2001	Erotic Sardines	Creating Living Deads (Kevin McKay's Lisbon Re-rub)	Lupeca	n/a
2001	Mateo & Matos	The Real Thing (Kevin's Heavy Dub Mix)	Glasgow Underground	n/a
2001	Vince Watson	Bubbles (Kevin's Twisted Edit)	Alola	n/a
2002	Attaboy	New World (Kevin McKay's Skansen Anthem Mix)	Toko	n/a
2002	Linus Loves	Body & Soul (Kevin's Dub Edit)	Glasgow Underground	n/a
2002	Romanthony	D'International Banger (Kev's Hotland Edit)	Blackmale	n/a
2002	Romanthony & DJ Predator	Music Mind (Kevin's DJ Groove)	Glasgow Underground	n/a
2003	16B	Doubt (Kevin McKay Heavy Heavy Dub)	Alola	n/a
2003	Kasso	Key West (Kevin's 80's Edit)	Glasgow Underground	n/a
2003	Mateo & Matos	The Real Thing (Kevin's Heavy Dub 2003)	Glasgow Underground	n/a
2003	Mateo & Matos	Feelin' Sexy (Kevin's Sexy Dub)	Glasgow Underground	n/a
2003	Pete Moss	Strive To Live (Kevin's Scorpio Rising Mix)	Alola	n/a
2003	Williams	Love Crisis (Kevin's Love on the Beach Remix)	Glasgow Underground	n/a
2007	Dada Life	Vote Yes (Luka Remix)	Prestel	
2011	Mash	Somebody's Property (Kevin McKay Remix)	Glasgow Underground	
2011	Romanthony	The Wanderer (Kevin McKay Remix)	Glasgow Underground	
2011	Tatoine	Sometimes (Kevin McKay Remix)	Repressure	
2012	Franky Redente	What You Want (Kevin McKay Edit)	Glasgow Underground	
2012	Romanthony	Bring U Up (Kevin McKay DJ Edit)	Glasgow Underground	18 (Funk/Soul/Disco)
2013	Brett Gould	Pebbles (Kevin McKay Remix)	Wildlife	
2013	Bxentric	Surrender (Kevin McKay & Phil Kelsey Mixes)	Glasgow Underground	
2013	Freeform Five featuring Juldeh Camara	Weltareh (Freeform Five & Kevin McKay Reform)	Eskimo	42 (Indie Dance / Nu-disco)
2013	Lee Webster	Burnin' (Kevin McKay Edit)	Glasgow Underground	
2013	Romanthony	Ministry of Love (Kevin McKay Mixes)	Glasgow Underground	90 (Deep House)
2013	Romanthony	Let Me Show You Love (Kevin McKay remix)	Glasgow Underground	59 (House)
2013	Walker & Royce	I Surrender (Lee Webster & Kevin McKay Remix)	Glasgow Underground	
2014	Barrientos	On My Mind (Illyus & Kevin McKay Edit)	Glasgow Underground	
2014	Franky Redente	What U Want (Kevin McKay 2014 Edit)	Glasgow Underground	
2014	Romanthony	Floorpiece (Kevin McKay Remix)	Glasgow Underground	
2014	Romanthony	Trust (Freeform Five & Kevin McKay Reform)	Glasgow Underground	
2015	Brett Gould	Don't Know Why (Kevin McKay Edit)	Glasgow Underground	
2015	DJ Lion, Pavel Petrov	Balkstage (Kevin McKay Remix)	Patent Skills	
2015	Dope Dog	Keep House Unda'ground (Kevin McKay Remix)	Glasgow Underground	
2015	EdOne & Bodden	I Can't Feel (Kevin McKay Deep Mix)	Glasgow Underground	
2015	EdOne & Bodden	I Can't Feel (Kevin McKay Remix)	Glasgow Underground	
2015	Illyus & Barrientos feat. Max Marshall	Chase Your Trip (Kevin McKay Remix)	Glasgow Underground	
2015	Over Kill	Serve It Cold (Kevin McKay Remix)	Glasgow Underground	
2015	Pavel Petrov	Suzane Sunshine (Kevin McKay Edit)	Glasgow Underground	
2015	Piemont	Like That (Kevin McKay Remix)	Glasgow Underground	
2015	Romanthony, Freeform Five & Kevin McKay	Trust (Kevin McKay 2015 Refix)	Glasgow Underground	
2015	Solaris Heights	Nightfall (Kevin McKay Remix)	Glasgow Underground	
2015	Solaris Heights	Together (Kevin McKay Remix)	Glasgow Underground	
2015	Stefan Obermaier	Sinaye (Kevin McKay Remix)	Glasgow Underground	
2016	Alaia & Gallo	Pushin' From The Walls (Kevin McKay Remix)	Glasgow Underground	36 (Tech House)
2016	Camelphat	The Quad (Kevin McKay Remix)	Glasgow Underground	
2016	Climbers	Make Love (Kevin McKay Remix)	Glasgow Underground	
2016	Climbers	Feel Good (Kevin McKay Remix)	Glasgow Underground	
2016	Dalfie	Love Me Don't (Kevin McKay Remix)	Glasgow Underground	
2016	Daniel Trim	Maleda (Kevin McKay Remix)	Glasgow Underground	
2016	Dantiez	Get Up (Kevin McKay Remix)	Glasgow Underground	
2016	Illyus & Barrientos	Touch My Mind (Kevin McKay Remix)	Glasgow Underground	
2016	Illyus & Barrientos	Hurry on Down (Kevin McKay Remix)	Glasgow Underground	
2016	Illyus & Barrientos	Strings (Kevin McKay Remix)	Glasgow Underground	
2016	Ismael Casimira	Toy Music (Kevin McKay Remix)	Glasgow Underground	
2016	J Paul Getto	Music Freek (Kevin McKay Remix)	Glasgow Underground	
2016	J Paul Getto	Love Freek (Kevin McKay Remix)	Glasgow Underground	
2016	J Paul Getto, Alex Herrera	Everything Changes (Kevin McKay Remix)	Glasgow Underground	
2016	Romanthony	Too Long (Kevin McKay & Landmark Remix)	Glasgow Underground	
2017	Alaia & Gallo	Never Win (Kevin McKay Remix)	Glasgow Underground	
2017	Brett Gould	Say It Loud (Kevin McKay Remix)	Glasgow Underground	
2017	Camelphat	It Is What It Is (Kevin McKay Remix)	Glasgow Underground	
2017	Chris Main	Superfreak (Kevin McKay Remix)	Glasgow Underground	
2017	Montel	Love in the Blue Zone (Kevin McKay Remix)	Glasgow Underground	74 (House)
2017	Piemont	Creep Back (Kevin McKay Remix)	Glasgow Underground	
2017	Sante Sansone	No More (Kevin McKay Remix)	Glasgow Underground	
2017	Vanilla Ace, Dharkfunkh	What We Gonna Do? (Kevin McKay Remix)	Glasgow Underground	
2017	Wally Lopez feat. Cevin Fisher	Don't Stop (Kevin McKay Remix)	Glasgow Underground	
2018	Start The Party	I Feel Love (Kevin McKay Remix)	Glasgow Underground	3 (House), 13 (Main Chart)
2019	Peter Brown	Beware of the Dog (Kevin McKay Remix)	Glasgow Underground	14 (House)
2019	BK298 ft. Byron Stingily	Sing (Kevin McKay Remix)	Cr2	
2019	Kokiri	Joy (Kevin McKay Remix)	Armada	87 (House)
2019	D:Ream	You're The Best Thing (Kevin McKay Remix)	New State	
2019	Funkerman	Speed Up (Kevin McKay, Qubiko & Funkerman Remix)	Glasgow Underground	
2019	Malu Cachu	Be With You (Kevin McKay Remix)	Glasgow Underground	42 (House)
2019	Peter Brown, Johan S	Disco Nugget (Kevin McKay Edit)	Glasgow Underground	
2019	Start The Party	Million Dollar Bill (Kevin McKay Remix)	Glasgow Underground	87 (House)
2019	Sam Dexter	More Love (Kevin McKay Remix)	Glasgow Underground	

DJ Mix albums
Year	Artist	Title	Label
1999	Various Artists	Glasgow Underground Volume 2	Glasgow Underground
2000	Various Artists	Glasgow Underground Volume 3	Glasgow Underground
2001	Various Artists	Glasgow Underground Volume 4	Glasgow Underground
2001	Various Artists	Glasgow Underground Presents Summer Breeze	Muzik Magazine
2002	Various Artists	Glasgow Underground Volume 5	Glasgow Underground
2004	Various Artists	Glasgow Underground Volume 6	Glasgow Underground
2014	Various Artists	Glasgow Underground 2014	Toolroom
2015	Various Artists	Glasgow Underground 2015	Toolroom
2015	Various Artists	Glasgow Underground Amsterdam 2015	Glasgow Underground
2015	Various Artists	Glasgow Underground Ibiza 2015	Glasgow Underground
2015	Various Artists	Glasgow Underground Miami 2015	Toolroom
2015	Various Artists	Glasgow Underground 97:07	Toolroom
2016	Various Artists	Glasgow Underground Ibiza 2016	Glasgow Underground
2016	Various Artists	Glasgow Underground Miami 2016	Toolroom
2017	Various Artists	Callisto	Glasgow Underground
2017	Various Artists	Glasgow Underground Ibiza 2017	Glasgow Underground
2017	Various Artists	Callisto Volume Two	Glasgow Underground
2018	Various Artists	Callisto Volume Three	Glasgow Underground
2019	Various Artists	House Music All Night Long	Glasgow Underground

Production & mixing credits
Year	Artist	Title	Label
1999	Daniel Ibbotson	Celebrate	Glasgow Underground
2000	Romanthony	R.Hide in Plain Site (Album)	Glasgow Underground
2000	Alex Moran	Earth Women Are Easy	Glasgow Underground
2004	Mylo	Destroy Rock & Roll (Album)	Breastfed
2005	Mylo vs Miami Sound Machine	Doctor Pressure	Breastfed
2006	Linus Loves	Stage Invader (Album)	Breastfed
2006	Mylo	Muscle Car (Mixes)	Breastfed
2007	Cobra Dukes	Leave The Light On	Prestel
2007	Cobra Dukes	Time Is Coming	Prestel
2008	Cobra Dukes	Airtight	Prestel
2009	Grum	Heartbeats (Worship Remix)	Heartbeats
2009	Grum	Heartbeats (Weird Tapes Remix)	Heartbeats
2012	Mash	Style Is The Answer (A Deeper Groove Remix)	Glasgow Underground
2012	Romanthony	Bring U Up (Barrientos Remix)	Glasgow Underground
2012	Romanthony	Bring U Up (Lee Webster Remix)	Glasgow Underground
2013	Admin	This World	Glasgow Underground
2013	Barrientos	Feel The Waves (EP)	Glasgow Underground
2013	Small Pyramids	Slow It Down (Album)	Glasgow Underground
2013	Visitor	Coming Home (Barrientos Dub)	Glasgow Underground
2013	Walker & Royce	I Surrender (Barrientos Remix)	Glasgow Underground

Singles (as Linus Loves)
Year	Artist	Title	Label
2003	Linus Loves	The Terrace	Breastfed
2004	Linus Loves	The Love EP	Discfunction
2005	Linus Loves	Bene & Angela	Breastfed
2005	Linus Loves	The Victoria Principle EP	Breastfed
2006	Linus Loves	Night Music (Mixes)	Breastfed

Remixes (as Linus Loves)
Year	Artist	Title	Label
2003	Elton John	Are You Ready For Love (Linus Loves Remix)	Southern Fried
2003	Linus Loves	Stand Back	Data
2004	Armand Van Helden	Hear My Name (Linus Loves Remix)	Southern Fried
2004	Rekindle	Ice Skating Girl (Linus Loves Remix)	Output
2005	Bodyrockers	Round And Round (Linus Loves Mix)	Mercury
2005	Bodyrockers	I Like The Way (Linus Loves Remix)	Mercury
2005	Flat Pack	Sweet Child of Mine (Linus Loves Mix)	Breastfed
2005	Franz & Shape	Countach (Linus Loves Remix)	Relish
2005	Husky Rescue	New Light of Tomorrow (Linus Loves Remix)	Catskills
2005	L.O.B.	Crockett's Theme (Linus Loves Remix)	Nebula
2005	Mattafix	Passer By (Linus Loves Mix)	Buddhist Punk
2005	Mylo	In My Arms (Linus Loves Remix)	Breastfed
2005	Plant Life	Luv Me (Til It Hurts) (Linus Loves Remix)	Gut
2005	Ran Shani	Cool Like That (Linus Loves Mix)	Breastfed
2005	The Funk Lowlives	Superlove (Linus Loves Mix)	Outer
2006	Salon Boris	Planet (Linus Loves Remix)	Udiscs

Singles (as Muzique Tropique)
Year	Artist	Title	Label
1994	4AM	Prelude to the Storm Ep	Muzique Tropique
1995	4AM	Underwater Blues EP	Muzique Tropique
1995	Muzique Tropique	Glasgow Underground EP	Jus' Trax
1995	West Coast Connection	Rollerball EP	Muzique Tropique
1996	American Intrigue	Brazilia EP	Muzique Tropique
1996	Communication X	Duality (Phase One)	Muzique Tropique
1996	Communication X	Duality (Phase Two)	Muzique Tropique
1996	Urban Revolution	Gospel Song / Back 2 Black	Muzique Tropique
1997	Muzique Tropique	Soul Cruising EP	Glasgow Underground
1998	Muzique Tropique	Phasers Set To Funk / Midnight in Atlantis	Glasgow Underground

Remixes (as Muzique Tropique)
Year	Artist	Title	Label
1996	Two Lone Swordsmen	Rico's Helly (Musique Tropique Remix)	Emissions Audio Output
1997	16B	Voices in the Sky (Muzique Tropique Remix)	Alola
1997	4AM	Kingston (Muzique Tropique Remix)	Glasgow Underground
1997	Dubtribe Sound System	We used to dance (Muzique Tropique's Glasgow Funk Mix)	Imperial Dub Recordings
1997	House of 909	City of Light (Muzique Tropique Remix)	Pagan
1997	Overview	Work it Out (Muzique Tropique Remix)	DiY Discs
1998	Cassio	Baby Love (Muzique Tropique's Love The Bass Mix)	Glasgow Underground
1998	Larry Heard presents Dance 2000	I Know That Its You (Muzique Tropique Remix)	Distance
1998	Mateo & Matos	Keep on Dancin' (Muzique Tropique Remixes)	Glasgow Underground
1998	Romatt Productions Featuring Nedelka	I Wanna Ride (Muzique Tropique Remix)	Glasgow Underground
1998	Spirit Guide	Namunba (Muzique Tropique's Glasgow Jazz Mix)	Odori
2000	Dubtribe Sound System	We Used To Dance (Carl's Up All Night Mix)	Glasgow Underground
2000	Jii Hoo	Let Me Luv U (Muzique Tropiques in Love Remix)	Glasgow Underground
2000	Jori Hulkkonen	7 Nites, 7 Dayz (Muzique Tropiques Love The Bass Mix)	Glasgow Underground

Singles & Remixes (as co-producer)
Year	Artist	Title	Label
1997	Sixteen Souls	On My Mind / Late Night Jam	Glasgow Underground
1997	Studio Blue	Just A Mood / Shona's Song	Glasgow Underground
1997	Studio Blue	Cantina Scene / Aquaman	Glasgow Underground
1997	Studio Blue	Lost in Edinburgh / A Dub For Marc	Glasgow Underground
1997	Harri & Studio Blue	Golden Monkey Theme / Surprise Reprise	Glasgow Underground
1998	Second-Hand Soul	Bar Blues EP	Glasgow Underground
1998	Sixteen Souls	Strange Girl EP	Alola
2002	Modem	Wannado	Glasgow Underground
2006	Mash	Somebody's Property (Zones Mixes)	Glasgow Underground
2007	Dada Life	Vote Yes (Zones Mixes)	Prestel
2007	Just Fascination	The Rain (incl. Zones Club Mix)	Prestel

== Bibliography ==
- Bidder, Sean (1999). House The Rough Guide. London: Rough Guides Ltd. ISBN 1-85828-432-5.
