= Illyus & Barrientos =

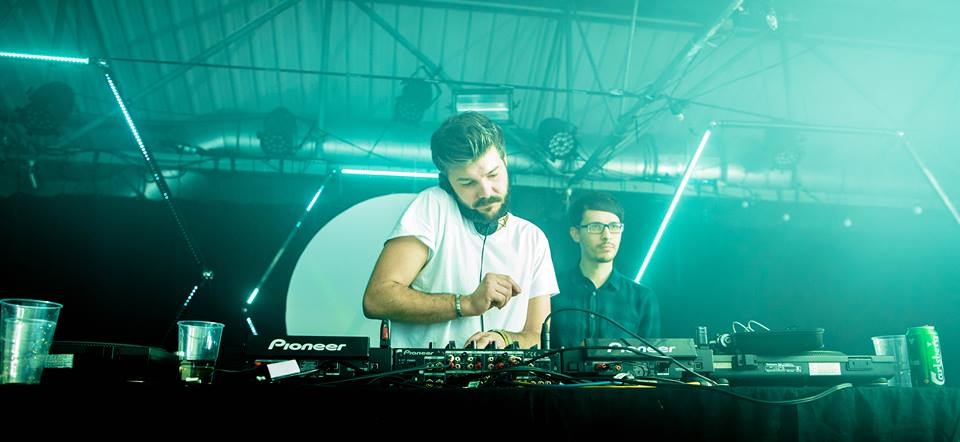
- Illyus & Barrientos live at Drygate, Glasgow - New Years 2016 Party.

Background information
- Origin: Glasgow, Scotland
- Genres: House; tech house; deep house; electronic
- Years active: 2014–present
- Labels: Toolroom Records; Glasgow Underground Recordings; Exploited Records; Suara Music; Love & Other
- Members: Illyus Brown
- Past members: Ivan Hall Barrientos
- Website: illyusandbarrientos.com

Illyus & Barrientos are an electronic music duo from Glasgow consisting of Illyus Brown & Ivan Hall Barrientos.

== Biography ==
The duo met through the recommendation of Glasgow Underground Recordings owner, Kevin McKay (musician) - soon releasing their debut EP entitled 'Do Anything You Wanna' on the same record label. The lead track was instantly picked up by BBC Radio 1's Sarah-Jane Crawford and subsequently made as her 'record of the week'. After gathering support of major BBC Radio 1 DJs such as Annie Mac, Pete Tong and Skream, one half of the duo was featured on Tong's show as part of the 'Future Stars' segment. Shortly after their release on Love & Other entitled 'Ballin', they were heavily featured across various shows on BBC Radio 1, including mixes for Annie Mac, Pete Tong, Annie Nightingale, Skream, B.Traits and MistaJam. Since then, the pair have released music on Toolroom Records, Suara Music and Exploited Records. As on 2026, Ivan Hall Barrientos was no longer part of the group, with Illyus Brown continuing the project solo under the name Illyus Barrientos.

== Discography ==
=== Extended plays ===
| Title | Label | Year |
|---|---|---|
| Do Anything You Wanna | Glasgow Underground | 2014 |
| Ballin | Love & Other | 2014 |
| Stranded | Love & Other | 2014 |
| Need Me | Glasgow Underground | 2014 |
| Camel Brotha/Just Bad Shit | Exploited Records | 2016 |
| Alright | Glasgow Underground | 2016 |
| Let's Go | Zoo Music | 2017 |
| Questions | Glasgow Underground | 2017 |

=== Singles ===
| Title | Label | Year |
|---|---|---|
| "Chase Your Trip" (feat. Max Marshall) | Glasgow Underground | 2015 |
| "Love You So Much" (featuring Trina Broussard) | Toolroom Records | 2016 |
| "Strings" | Glasgow Underground | 2016 |
| "Touch My Mind" | Glasgow Underground | 2016 |
| "Movin'" | Guesthouse Music | 2017 |
| "Takin' Over" | Defected | 2017 |
| "Let's Get Together" (with Karen Harding) | Ultra Records | 2020 |

=== Remixes ===
| Title | Label | Year |
|---|---|---|
| Grum - Tears (Illyus & Barrientos Remix) | Armada Music | 2014 |
| Montel - The Journey (Illyus & Barrientos Remix) | Bass Hit Dub | 2014 |
| LTMDTW x Jesse Boykins III - The Rain (Illyus & Barrientos Remix) | MadTech Records | 2014 |
| Solaris Heights - Glisten (Illyus & Barrientos Remix) | Glasgow Underground | 2014 |
| Kokiri - Retrospect (Illyus & Barrientos Remix) | Love & Other | 2014 |
| Gorgon City feat. Jennifer Hudson – Go All Night (Illyus & Barrientos Remix) | Virgin EMI Records | 2014 |
| Romanthony - Testify (Illyus & Barrientos Remix) | Glasgow Underground | 2015 |
| Listenbee - Save Me (Illyus & Barrientos Remix) | Ultra Music | 2015 |
| Joshi Mami - I Need Your Love (Illyus & Barrientos Remix) | Ego Italy | 2015 |
| Five Knives - Savages (Illyus & Barrientos Remix) | Red Bull Records | 2015 |
| Above & Beyond - All Over The World (Illyus & Barrientos Remix) | Anjunabeats | 2015 |
| Embody x Ang Lo - Drive (Illyus & Barrientos Remix) | Just Off Pop | 2015 |
| DJ S.K.T - Take Me Away (Illyus & Barrientos Remix) | Azuli Records | 2015 |
| Lovebirds - Want You In My Soul (Illyus & Barrientos Remix) | Island Records | 2015 |
| Alex Adair - Make Me Feel Better (Illyus & Barrientos Remix) | Virgin EMI Records | 2015 |
| Eelke Kleijn - Mistakes I've Made (Illyus & Barrientos Remix) | Spinnin' Deep | 2015 |
| Horixon - Colours (Illyus & Barrientos Remix) | Eskimo Recordings | 2015 |
| MK - Bring Me To Life (Illyus & Barrientos Remix) | Columbia Records | 2015 |
| EdOne & Bodden - I Can't Feel (Illyus & Barrientos Remix) | Glasgow Underground | 2015 |
| Purple Disco Machine - Soul So Sweet (Illyus & Barrientos Remix) | Sony Music Entertainment | 2015 |
| Per QX - Let It Go (Illyus & Barrientos Remix) | Glasgow Underground | 2016 |
| Hannah Wants - Just [feat. Kristine W] (Illyus & Barrientos Remix) | Toolroom Records | 2016 |
| Mandal & Forbes - Really Love (Illyus & Barrientos Remix) | Cr2 Records | 2016 |
| Adala - Hear It Everywhere (Illyus & Barrientos Remix) | No Brainer Records | 2017 |
| Anton Powers & Pixie Lott - Baby (Illyus & Barrientos Remix) | 3beat Records | 2017 |
| Ki Creighton - Jessie's Joint (Illyus & Barrientos Remix) | Under No Illusion | 2017 |
| Kylie Minogue - Dancing (Illyus & Barrientos Remix) | BMG Rights Management | 2018 |
