= Ball and chain (disambiguation) =

A ball and chain is a type of restraint device.

Ball and chain may also refer to:

== Film and television ==
- Ball & Chain, a 2004 American film
- "Ball and Chain" (Haven), a television episode

== Songs ==
- "Ball and Chain" (Big Mama Thornton song), 1968; covered by Janis Joplin
- "Ball and Chain" (Elton John song), 1982
- "Ball and Chain" (Paul Overstreet song), 1991
- "Ball and Chain" (Social Distortion song), 1990
- "Ball and Chain" (The Who song), 2019
- "Ball and Chain" (XTC song), 1982
- "Make This Love Right" or "The Ball and Chain", by Romanthony, 1991
- "Ball and Chain", by Aldo Nova from Aldo Nova, 1982
- "Ball and Chain", by Anouk from Who's Your Momma, 2007
- "Ball and Chain", by Anthony Hamilton from Soulife, 2005
- "Ball and Chain", by Barclay James Harvest from "Once Again", 1971
- "Ball and Chain", by Cage the Elephant from Neon Pill, 2024
- "Ball and Chain", by Live from The Death of a Dictionary, 1989
- "Ball & Chain", by Martha Wainwright from Martha Wainwright, 2005
- "Ball & Chain", by Murder by Death from Red of Tooth and Claw, 2008
- "Ball and Chain", a song from the television series Nashville, 2013
- "Ball and Chain", by Poison from Flesh and Blood, 1990
- "Ball and Chain", by Razor from Armed & Dangerous, 1984
- "Ball and Chain", by Sublime from 40oz. to Freedom, 1992
- "Ball and Chain", by Thunder from Behind Closed Doors, 1995
- "Ball and Chain", by Tommy James, 1970
- "Ball & Chain", by Van Morrison from Too Long in Exile, 1993
- "Ball and Chain", by Yelawolf from Love Story, 2015

== Other uses ==
- Ball-and-chain flail, a European weapon consisting of a wooden haft connected by a chain, rope, or leather to one or more striking ends
- Ball-and-chain inactivation, a model to explain the fast inactivation mechanism of voltage-gated ion channels

== See also ==
- Ball chain, a type of chain consisting of small sheet metal balls connected via short lengths of wire
- Chain Chomp, a fictional species in the Mario franchise
- Hammer throw, a track and field event using a metal ball attached by a steel wire to a grip
- Meteor hammer, an ancient Chinese weapon consisting of one or two weights connected by a rope or chain
- Wrecking ball, a heavy steel ball hung from a crane that is used for demolishing large buildings
