= Instinctual (Romanthony album) =

Studio album by Romanthony
- Released: March 1, 1999
- Recorded: Glasgow Underground Records
- Genre: Deep house

Romanthony chronology
Romanworld (1997)	Instinctual (1999)	Live in the Mix (1999)

Professional ratings
Review scores
Source	Rating
AllMusic	3/5 stars
The Encyclopedia of Popular Music	3/5 stars

Instinctual is an album by the American garage house producer Romanthony, with New York producer Mary Mac aka DJ Predator. It was released by Glasgow Underground Records in 1999.

== Track listing ==
1. "Mind O' a Predator"
2. "It's Startin'"
3. "Remember a Song"
4. "Clap Ya Handz"
5. "Handz N d' Air"
6. "Do You Wanna Dance"
7. "Music Mind"
8. "Funky Flava"
9. "Let's Work (Beatdown)"
10. "Comin' 4 U"
