= Drop the Pressure =

2005 single by Mylo and Miami Sound Machine

Single by Mylo

from the album Destroy Rock & Roll
- Released: May 2004
- Length: 4:15
- Label: Breastfed
- Songwriter: Myles MacInnes
- Producer: MacInnes

Mylo singles chronology
"Muscle Car" (2004)	"Drop the Pressure" (2004)	"Valley of the Dolls" (2004)

"Drop the Pressure" is a song by the Scottish electronic dance musician Mylo. It appears on Mylo's first and only album Destroy Rock & Roll and was released as a single in the UK on 18 October 2004. The song is constructed from an instrumental and a single vocal line recording by Mylo, who used Reason 2.5 to incorporate a vocoder module.

"Drop the Pressure" peaked at number 19 on the UK Singles Chart, yet topped the charts in the UK in both the Independent Singles Chart and Dance Singles Chart. A mash-up of "Drop the Pressure" and Miami Sound Machine's 1984 song "Dr. Beat" was released in 2005 as "Doctor Pressure".

== Charts ==
Weekly chart performance for "Drop the Pressure"
Chart (2004–2005)	Peak position
Australia (ARIA)	46
Belgium (Ultratop 50 Flanders)	27
France (SNEP)	34
Germany (GfK)	43
Hungary (Dance Top 40)	36
Italy (FIMI)	43
Netherlands (Single Top 100)	32
UK Singles (Official Charts)	19
UK Indie (Official Charts)	1
UK Dance (Official Charts)	1
