= R.Hide in Plain Site =

Studio album by Romanthony
- Released: April 18, 2000
- Genre: Deep house; garage house
- Label: Glasgow Underground

Romanthony chronology
Live in the Mix (1999)	R.Hide in Plain Site (2000)

R.Hide in Plain Site is the fourth and final studio album by American garage house producer Romanthony. It was released by Glasgow Underground Records on April 18, 2000.

== Track listing ==
1. "Countdown 2000"
2. "Bring U Up"
3. "Luv Somebody"
4. "Feel Ya Love"
5. "Wreck"
6. "Down 4 U"
7. "Floorpiece"
8. "Count Da Ways"
9. "Body Language"
10. "? $ Luv"
11. "Faraway"
