= Eddie Matos =

Eddie Matos may refer to:

- Eddie Matos (actor) (born 1978), American actor
- Eddie Matos (musician), American DJ and music producer
