= Future Lover (Mirai Koibito) =

Single by Miliyah Kato

from the album Liberty
- B-side: "Lipstick (Shingo. S Remix)"
- Released: January 13, 2016
- Genre: J-pop; EDM
- Length: 6:02
- Label: Mastersix Foundation
- Songwriter(s): Miliyah Kato; Thomas Bangalter; Guy-Manuel de Homem-Christo; Anthony Moore
- Producer(s): Miliyah Kato

Miliyah Kato singles chronology
"Lipstick" (2015)	"Future Lover (Mirai Koibito)" (2016)	"Saikouna Shiawase" (2016)

"Future Lover (Mirai Koibito)" (FUTURE LOVER -未来恋人-) is a song by Japanese singer-songwriter Miliyah Kato from her eighth studio album, Liberty (2016). The song was written by Kato herself, Thomas Bangalter, Guy-Manuel de Homem-Christo, and Anthony Moore, and produced by Kato. The song was released as the title track of the three-track single for the CD and digital download on 13 January 2016 through Mastersix Foundation, as the fourth single from Liberty. Ahead of its official release, the song was pre-released on 8 January 2016 for digital download.

"Future Lover (Mirai Koibito)" is a up-tempo electronic dance music (EDM) track with the elements of traditional Japanese music, and incorporates the Daft Punk song "One More Time" (2000). The single peaked at number 30 on the Billboard Japan Hot 100 and reached number 42 on the Oricon Weekly Singles Chart. The accompanying music video was directed by Motoki Munaka and premiered on 12 January 2016., and another version of the video, titled Dance Only version, was released on 29 December 2015.

== Commercial performance ==
In Japan, "Future Lover -Mirai Koibito-" debuted at number 94 on the Billboard Japan Hot 100 dated 18 January 2016. It peaked at number 30 the following week. On the Oricon Weekly Singles Chart, the single debuted at number 42 with the sales of 1,172 copies and stayed on the chart for two consecutive weeks, selling 1,456 physical copies in total.

== Live performances ==
Kato performed "Future Lover -Mirai Koibito-" on 9 January 2016 at the "Ageha New Years Party Day 1 feat. Agepa!! Official Media by Modelpress" at the Shinkiba Ageha. Kato promoted the song with several televised performances, such as Buzz Rhythm. Later, "Future Lover -Mirai Koibito-" was included on the setlists of Kato's "Dramatic Liberty" Tour 2016, on which she embarked April 2016.

== Track listing ==
CD single/digital download
No.	Title	Writer(s)	Arranger(s)	Length
1.	"Future Lover (Mirai Koibito)"	Miliyah Kato; Thomas Bangalter; Guy-Manuel de Homem-Christo; Anthony Moore	Kato	6:02
2.	"Lipstick" (Shingo. S Remix)	Kato	Shingo. S	5:08
3.	"Future Lover (Mirai Koibito)" (Instrumental)	Kato; Bangalter; Homem-Christo; Romanthony	Kato	6:00
Total length:				17:10

== Charts ==
Weekly chart performance for "Future Lover (Mirai Koibito)"
Chart (2016)	Peak position
Japan (Hot 100)	42
Japan CD (Oricon)	30

== Sales ==
Sales for "Future Lover (Mirai Koibito)"
Region	Certification	Certified units/sales
Japan (RIAJ)	None	1,456 (CD)

== Release history ==
Release history and formats for "Future Lover (Mirai Koibito)"
Region	Date	Format	Catalogue Num.	Label	Ref.
Japan	8 January 2016	Digital download		Mastersix Foundation	
Japan	13 January 206	CD	SRCL-8967	Mastersix Foundation	
