= Make This Love Right =

"Make This Love Right" (more commonly known as "The Ball and Chain"), is a single written and produced by New Jersey garage house producer Romanthony. The song was originally released on Romanthony's label Black Male Records of New Jersey in 1991 and later released on Azuli Records in 1993.

The nickname for the record comes from the prominent lines in the song:

The ball and chain, will never break me down well. See I can't stand the pain, well, of having you around. I want to get higher, higher and higher, and soar on through the sky.

The song was a cultural craze in the city of Cork, Ireland, in the late 1990s, where it became an anthem for clubgoers at venues like Sir Henry's. Copies of the record were routinely sold for close to IE£100 (€127) in the city and it received extensive air-play on mainstream local radio and in nightclubs. Such was the demand for the record in Cork that a special repress was made in the year 2000.
