= Liberty (Miliyah Kato album) =

- Standard edition/digital download cover

Studio album by Miliyah Kato
- Released: March 2, 2016
- Genre: Electronic, funk, soul, pop, hip hop
- Length: 71:32
- Label: Mastersix Foundation

Miliyah Kato chronology
| Loveland (2014) | Liberty (2016) | Utopia (2017) |

Singles from Liberty
- 1. "Shounen Shoujo" Released: January 14, 2015; 2. "Piece of Cake -Ai wo Sakebou-" Released: September 2, 2015; 3. "Lipstick" Released: November 25, 2015; 4. "Future Lover -Mirai Koibito-" Released: January 13, 2016

Liberty is Miliyah Kato's eighth studio album. It was released on March 2, 2016.

== Album information ==
Liberty contains singles "Shounen Shoujo, "Piece of Cake", "Lipstick", and " Future Lover". It was released in two editions: a CD and a CD+DVD with the music videos of the singles,

== Reception ==
=== Commercial performance ===
The album opened at #4 on the weekly Oricon chart and continued to rank for a total of nine weeks. LIBERTY is Kato's first studio album to rank outside of the top three since 2008's TOKYO STAR, which reached #5 but had stronger first week sales. This is her lowest selling studio album.

Despite the poor physical sales the album still managed to reach #1 on iTunes

== Track listing ==
CD
| No. | Title | Writer(s) | Length |
|---|---|---|---|
| 1. | "Liberty" | Miliyah | 3:23 |
| 2. | "Future Lover-未来恋人-" (Sampling: Daft Punk’s "One More Time") | Anthony Wayne Moore, Guy Manuel Homem Christo*, Miliyah*, Thomas Bangalter | 5:59 |
| 3. | "Want You Back" | Miliyah | 4:43 |
| 4. | "うたかたの日々" | Miliyah | 4:00 |
| 5. | "Wanna Be" | Miliyah | 4:10 |
| 6. | "This Is My Party" | Miliyah | 3:02 |
| 7. | "Mirror Mirror" | Miliyah | 3:45 |
| 8. | "天国のドア" | Miliyah | 3:56 |
| 9. | "少年少女" | Miliyah | 4:10 |
| 10. | "Climax" | Miliyah | 5:07 |
| 11. | "Babylon" (Sampling: Ryuichi Sakamoto’s "Energy Flow") | Miliyah*, Ryuichi Sakamoto | 4:10 |
| 12. | "Fashion" | Miliyah | 3:08 |
| 13. | "女神の光 feat.牧宗孝" | Miliyah | 3:46 |
| 14. | "Memories" | Miliyah | 3:01 |
| 15. | "ピース オブ ケイク-愛を叫ぼう- feat.峯田和伸" | Kazunobu Mineta, Miliyah* | 3:45 |
| 16. | "Hikari" | Miliyah | 5:35 |
| 17. | "リップスティック" | Miliyah | 5:52 |

DVD
| No. | Title | Length |
|---|---|---|
| 1. | "MILIYAH ALBUM SPECIAL INTERVIEW" |
| 2. | "SHOUNEN SHOUJO" (Music video) |
| 3. | "PIECE OF CAKE AIWO SAKEBOU" (featuring Kazunobu Mineta, Music video) |
| 4. | "LIP STICK" (featuring Kento Mori, music video) |
| 5. | "FUTURE LOVER" (Music video) |

== Influences ==
Fans believe the album was influenced by Grimes's 2015 studio album "Art Angels". Stylistically this was abundant from Miliyah's visuals for the album being a pink cowboy hat which she wore to promote the album and angel wings., which grimes fashioned for her music video "Flesh without Blood" shortly before the release of Liberty. While Miliyah was promoting the album through an instagram video, she was playing the song "Kill V. Maim" from "Art Angels", which could be seen in the background.

== Promotion ==
Miliyah promoted the album in various ways, through her jewellery line "Mirror" she released 3 items in theme of Liberty a "MIRROR MEXICAN SKULL NECKLACE" selling for ¥13,000 (around $119) the Necklace fit the theme of the "DRAMATIC LIBERTY" tour which featured influences from the Mexican day of the dead. She then had the "LIBERTY RING" which sold for ¥28,000 (around $257) and featured wings which she wore on at the "DRAMATIC LIBERTY" tour and used for the limited edition Blu-Ray/DVD art for the tour. Then finally the "ROSARIO NECKLACE" which sold for ¥45,000 (around $413) which featured Miliyah's consistent use of crosses and the LIBERTY wings all items were made from genuine silver, and had limited qualities and were obtained through a lottery and through the DRAMATIC LIBERTY tour.

During the Liberty era Miliyah began some heavy promotion with the fitness clothing brand Under Armour. featuring in various appearances throughout the year, even releasing her own clothing under the brand Later in the campaign she had her signature pink hair and would have promotion photos of LIBERTY during her appearances. Even wearing clothing featuring the LIBERTY wings with the Under Armour clothing during a promotional photo shoot for FRaU magazine.
