= Romanworld =

Studio album by Romanthony
- Released: March 17, 1997
- Genre: Garage house; deep house
- Length: 1:41:24
- Label: Azuli
- Producer: Romanthony

Romanthony chronology
Romanworld (1997)	Instinctual (1999)

Professional ratings
Review scores
Source	Rating
Allmusic	3/5 stars

Romanworld is the debut album by American garage house producer Romanthony. It was released by Azuli Records on March 17, 1997. It is a double album of mostly previously released work, with some new mixes of these songs.

== Track listing ==
CD

All tracks are written by Anthony Wayne Moore.

Disc one
No.	Title	Length
1.	"Romanworld"
2.	"Make This Love Right"
3.	"Now You Want Blues"
4.	"Now You Want Me"
5.	"Let Me Show You Love"
6.	"Come My Way"

Disc two
No.	Title	Length
1.	"Desire"
2.	"Falling from Grace"
3.	"Testify"
4.	"Soul on Fire"
5.	"Ministry of Love"
6.	"In the Mix"

Both discs are continuous without any track markings.

Vinyl

Side A
No.	Title	Length
1.	"Desire"
2.	"Falling from Grace"

Side B
No.	Title	Length
1.	"Testify"
2.	"Soul on Fire"
3.	"Ministry of Love"
4.	"In the Mix"

Side C
No.	Title	Length
1.	"Romanworld"
2.	"Make This Love Right"
3.	"Now You Want Blues"

Side D
No.	Title	Length
1.	"Now You Want Me"
2.	"Let Me Show Love"
3.	"Come My Way"

The vinyl release has an identical tracklist to the CD release, but the first half is on sides C and D and the second half is on sides A and B. Due to the limits of the vinyl format, some of the tracks fade out early.
