= Eddie Johns =

Liberian musician (born 1951)

- Born: Foda Eddie Johns; 1951 (age 74–75); Liberia
- Genres: Disco; soul; funk; rock; soft rock
- Occupations: Singer, songwriter
- Labels: President, GM Musipro

Foda Eddie Johns (born 1951) is a Liberian singer-songwriter in the disco, funk, soul, rock and soft rock genres. Johns did not find mainstream success during his career and became homeless upon suffering a stroke hindering his ability to make music. The French electronic duo Daft Punk used a sample of Johns's 1979 disco song "More Spell on You" in their 2000 song "One More Time".

== Early life ==
Johns was born in 1951 in Liberia. His father was an accountant and his mother was a nurse. Altogether, they had eight children. In an article in the Los Angeles Times, Johns stated that his mother "was always singing or humming while doing housework." Staff writer August Brown stated in that same article that Johns, too, "discovered he had a gift for singing." He "fell in love with American rock and soul artists like Aretha Franklin, Johnnie Taylor, Jimi Hendrix and Eddie Floyd." Brown added that Johns "moved to Paris in 1977 to make records" and "sometimes struggled to earn money, and experienced bouts of homelessness there." Johns has a daughter who lives in France.

== Career ==
Johns recorded two albums while living in Paris, More Spell on You and Paris Metro. After his music career ended in part due to management issues, he moved to the United States, eventually settling in Pasadena.

== "One More Time" ==
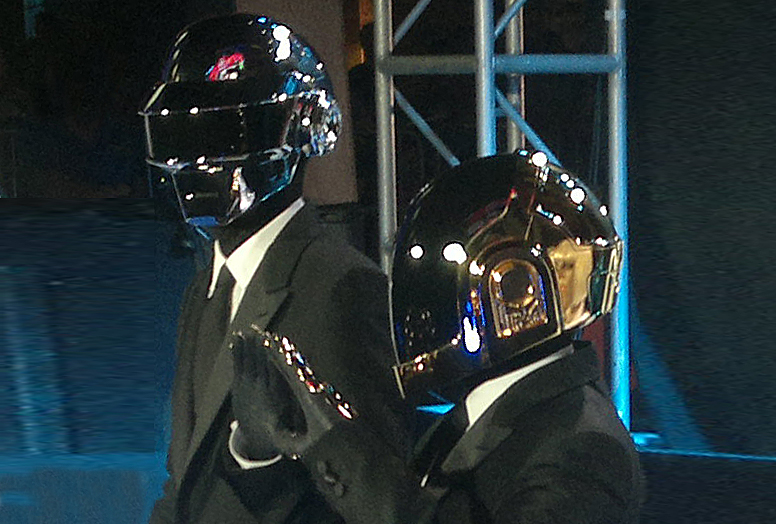
Daft Punk in 2010

The French electronic duo Daft Punk used a sample of Johns's 1979 disco song "More Spell on You" in their 2000 song "One More Time". Johns never received royalties for the sample, as the publishing company that owns the rights could not trace him. The song is estimated to generate royalties "in the high six-to-seven-figure range" based on streams alone.

A representative for Daft Punk confirmed the use of the sample and that Daft Punk continued to pay royalties to GM Musipro, the French publishing company that owned the rights to "More Spell on You". A representative of GM Musipro said they had never been able to locate Johns, and that they would follow up on the matter after an investigation by the Los Angeles Times in 2021.

== Discography ==
=== Studio albums ===
- More Spell on You (1979)
- Paris Métro (1980)

=== Singles ===
- "Sag Warum" (1978)
- "I Put a Spell on You" (with M. Diggo) (1978)
- "More Spell on You" (1979)
