= One More Time (Daft Punk song) =

2000 song by Daft Punk

Single by Daft Punk

from the album Discovery
- Released: 13 November 2000
- Recorded: 1998
- Genre: French house; disco; club; electropop
- Length: 5:20 (album version); 3:56 (radio edit)
- Label: Virgin
- Songwriters: Thomas Bangalter; Guy-Manuel de Homem-Christo; Anthony Moore
- Producers: Thomas Bangalter; Guy-Manuel de Homem-Christo

Daft Punk singles chronology
"Revolution 909" (1998)	"One More Time" (2000)	"Aerodynamic" (2001)

Audio sample
- Daft Punk – "One More Time": file; help

Music video
- "One More Time" on YouTube

"One More Time" is a song by French electronic music duo Daft Punk, released in November 2000 by Virgin Records as the lead single from their second studio album, Discovery (2001). It is a French house song featuring an auto-tuned vocal performance by American DJ Romanthony and a sample of "More Spell on You" by Eddie Johns. The music video forms part of the 2003 anime film Interstella 5555: The 5tory of the 5ecret 5tar 5ystem. "One More Time" reached number one on the French Singles Chart, number two on the UK singles chart, and number 61 on the US Billboard Hot 100.

The Village Voice's Pazz & Jop annual year-end critics' poll named "One More Time" one of the best songs of the year. It was named one of the greatest songs of the decade by Pitchfork, and Rolling Stone named it one of "The 500 Greatest Songs of All Time". Mixmag readers voted it the greatest dance record of all time.

== Background ==
Thomas Bangalter and Guy-Manuel de Homem-Christo of Daft Punk cited Romanthony as an influence on their track "Teachers" and met him at the 1996 Winter Music Conference, where they became friends. They sought to collaborate with him on their debut album Homework but initially faced difficulty convincing him due to their then-unknown status. Despite this, Romanthony expressed enthusiasm for their work. He later released the single "Hold On" on Bangalter's label, Roulé, prior to the release of Daft Punk's single.

== Composition ==
"One More Time" samples the obscure 1978 disco song "More Spell on You" by Eddie Johns. Daft Punk sampled the horn section and rearranged it to create the hook. The vocal part was written and performed by Romanthony. Homem-Christo said "we thought the funkiness of his voice fit the funkiness of the music".

The song was considered an example of French house's use of audio filters, featuring processed auto-tuned vocals. Thomas Bangalter said: "A lot of people complain about musicians using Auto-Tune. It reminds me of the late '70s when musicians in France tried to ban the synthesizer... What they didn't see was that you could use those tools in a new way instead of just for replacing the instruments that came before." According to Bangalter, Romanthony liked the effect and was interested in innovation. Bangalter said:

We care less now than we used to about what critics say about our music. We liked the track, Romanthony liked it, we can be disappointed about what they said about the song, but still we liked it. It's just music, it's just entertainment, and as long as we believe in it that's what is important. It's what we wanted to do. We love to be able to use instruments the way we want to. Criticising the Vocoder is like asking bands in the '60s, 'Why do you use the electric guitar?' It's just a tool... no big deal. Creation is interaction. The healthy thing is that people either loved it or hated it. At least people were not neutral. The worst thing when you make art is for people to not even be moved by it. Love and hate are interesting because it's deep and intense. It's one side of our music that people might be sensitive to and others might not.

The album version includes a two-minute breakdown. Bangalter said: "The break is so long it's not even the break. The song itself is the breakdown."

Daft Punk considered "One More Time" the link connecting their previous studio album Homework to Discovery. They completed it in 1998, where it remained "sitting on a shelf" until its release on 13 November 2000.

== Sampling credit ==
Johns did not receive credit for the sample of "More Spell on You". As of 2021, following a stroke that left him unable to work, he was living in assisted housing and had not received a payment. Previously, he was homeless in Los Angeles for over a decade. A representative confirmed that Daft Punk paid royalties to the owner of "More Spell on You", the French record label and music publisher GM Musipro, and said that, per the agreement, it was GM Musipro's duty to pay royalties to Johns. The GM Musipro founder said they had never been able to locate Johns and that they would follow up after an investigation by the Los Angeles Times in 2021. The music attorney Erin M. Jacobson said it was common for rights owners to be untraceable and estimated that Johns could be owed a sum "in the high six-to-seven-figure range" based on streams alone.

== Release ==
The single contains an eight-minute version of "One More Time" featuring extended vocals absent from the album version. An "unplugged" rendition was included in the 2003 remix album Daft Club. The remix album contains a remix of "Aerodynamic" by Daft Punk featuring elements of "One More Time". The "short radio edit" of "One More Time" from the single was later included in the 2006 compilation album Musique Vol. 1 1993–2005. Daft Punk performed "One More Time" on their Alive 2006/2007 tour; a performance was included on the live album Alive 2007.

=== Use in other works ===
"One More Time" was sampled and incorporated in Miliyah Kato's song "Future Lover (Mirai Koibito)" from her album Liberty in January 2016. The song peaked at number 30 in Japan.. Singer and actor Anthony Ramos covered the song for the 2020 DreamWorks Animation movie Trolls World Tour for his character. The track was also sampled and interpolated in the Drake and 21 Savage song "Circo Loco" on their album, Her Loss (2022); however, the sample was heavily criticized by critics, with Paul A. Thompson of Pitchfork describing the song as having a "hammily stupid Daft Punk flip", while Josh Svetz of Paste wrote that the song's "worst crime is butchering Daft Punk's classic "One More Time"." 2023 Britain's Got Talent series 16 winner Viggo Venn used the song during his audition round.

== Music video ==
"One More Time" appears in the 2003 animated film Interstella 5555: The 5tory of the 5ecret 5tar 5ystem, serving as a visual interpretation of Daft Punk's album Discovery. The film was co-written by Daft Punk and Cédric Hervet, and directed by Kazuhisa Takenouchi, Hirotoshi Rissen, and Daisuke Nishio, under the visual supervision of Leiji Matsumoto. The song opens the film, introducing a pop band of humanoid, blue-skinned aliens consisting of guitarist Arpegius, drummer Baryl, keyboardist Octave, and bassist Stella. They perform a concert in front of an auditorium filled with thousands of extraterrestrial spectators also sporting blue skin. Towards the video's conclusion, spaceships invade the venue under the command of a mysterious, darkly attired figure.

== Other versions ==
An "unplugged" rendition by Romanthony was included in the 2003 remix album Daft Club. The remix album also features a remix of "Aerodynamic" by Daft Punk, incorporating elements of "One More Time". The "unplugged" rendition was unfavorably reviewed, with Ben Cardew of Vice saying that it was "as celebratory as a party popper firing off a balcony" and that it was "like Daft Punk as played by David Brent, which sounds brilliant but really isn't." Nick Sylvester of Pitchfork sarcastically stated, "It's not like Romanthony's gonna do something stupid like do an acoustic version of the song and actually sing without those vocal effects– that would be suicide!" Additionally, a "short radio edit" of the song was included in the 2006 compilation album Musique Vol. 1 1993–2005. Daft Punk remixed the song during their Alive 2006/2007 tour, both with "Aerodynamic" and as part of a mix with "Human After All", "Together" and "Music Sounds Better with You." This remixes were included on the live album Alive 2007.

=== Use in other works ===
"One More Time" has been sampled and interpolated numerous times by various artists. In 2011, Machine Gun Kelly's album Rage Pack included the song "LTFU (One More Time)", which sampled "One More Time". In the following year, Lil B incorporated the track into "BasedGod Fucked My Bitches," featured on his mixtape "White Flame." In January 2016, "One More Time" was sampled and incorporated into Miliyah Kato's song "Future Lover (Mirai Koibito)", with the song peaking at number 30 on the Oricon charts and number 42 on Billboard Japan Hot 100.

In November 2022, Drake and 21 Savage sampled "One More Time" in their song "Circo Loco" from the album Her Loss. The sample was heavily criticized by critics, with Paul A. Thompson of Pitchfork describing the song as having a "hammily stupid Daft Punk flip," while Josh Svetz of Paste wrote that the song's "worst crime is butchering Daft Punk's classic 'One More Time.'"

== Chart performance ==
"One More Time" was one of a few songs to debut at number-one on the Eurochart Hot 100 Singles chart. It topped the single sales charts of Daft Punk's native France, Canada, and Portugal, and the dance charts of the UK, Ireland, Flanders, and the United States. The song almost topped the UK and Scottish Singles Chart, as well as Australia's dance chart, but stalled at number two. Elsewhere in Europe, the song was in the top-ten of sales chart in ten countries and an airplay chart for Poland. On the Danish singles chart and the Dutch Top 40, it almost was, but stopped at number eleven. It also made the bottom position of the top-ten in the Oceanic countries of Australia and New Zealand. The song's lowest peak on a single sales chart was in Sweden, where it reached number 26 during a 14-week run on a top-60 chart.

In the United States, "One More Time" peaked at number 61 on a 16-week run on the Billboard Hot 100 (tying with previous Daft Punk hit, "Around the World"), which, unlike most other national singles charts at the time that were sales-only, factored in both sales and radio. Its appearance on the chart was mainly due to sales; on the component chart for the format, it reached number 17 on its 14th week and lasted 26 weeks, exiting at number 71. By June 2013 it had sold 1,052,000 digital copies there, and became Daft Punk's first million-seller. On the Hot 100's top-75 component chart for radio, however, it only spent one week at number 71.

== Legacy ==
"One More Time" was listed at number five on Pitchfork's top 500 songs of the 2000s, with the magazine writing that it "distill[s] 25 years of pop and house into five and a half minutes of first-time joy." Rolling Stone listed it at number 33 of their top 100 songs of the decade (2000–2009) as well as number 307 on its amended "The 500 Greatest Songs of All Time" list in May 2010. It was voted by Mixmag readers as the greatest dance record of all time. The song was also ranked at number 11 on The Village Voice's Pazz & Jop annual year-end critics' poll. In 2021, Billboard magazine ranked it number one on its list of the 20 greatest Daft Punk songs. In 2022, Rolling Stone ranked "One More Time" number two in their "200 Greatest Dance Songs of All Time" list. In 2024, The Guardian named it the best French touch track. In 2025, Billboard ranked "One More Time" the third-best dance song of all time.

"One More Time" was chosen as the goal song for the France national football team during the 2026 FIFA World Cup.

== Track listing ==
CD-Maxi (Virgin 8972112)
No.	Title	Length
1.	"One More Time" (short radio edit)	3:56
2.	"One More Time" (radio edit*)	5:20
3.	"One More Time" (club mix)	8:01
Total length:		17:17

*Note: The radio edit is identical in length to the album version, but ends with a fade out.

== Charts ==
=== Weekly charts ===
2000–2001 weekly chart performance for "One More Time"
Chart (2000–2001)	Peak position
Australia (ARIA)	10
Australian Dance (ARIA)	2
Austria (Ö3 Austria Top 40)	7
Belgium (Ultratop 50 Flanders)	6
Belgium (Ultratop 50 Wallonia)	7
Belgium Dance (Ultratop Flanders)	1
Canada (Nielsen SoundScan)	1
Canada CHR (Nielsen BDS)	8
Denmark (Tracklisten)	11
Europe (Eurochart Hot 100 Singles)	1
Finland (Suomen virallinen lista)	8
France (SNEP)	1
Germany (GfK)	7
Greece (IFPI)	4
Ireland (IRMA)	9
Ireland Dance (IRMA)	1
Italy (FIMI)	5
Netherlands (Dutch Top 40)	11
Netherlands (Single Top 100)	14
New Zealand (Recorded Music NZ)	10
Poland Airplay (Music & Media)	6
Portugal (AFP)	1
Scottish Singles Sales (Official Charts)	2
Spain (Promusicae)	3
Sweden (Sverigetopplistan)	26
Switzerland (Schweizer Hitparade)	6
UK Singles (Official Charts)	2
UK Dance (Official Charts)	1
US Billboard Hot 100	61
US Dance Club Songs (Billboard)	1
US Dance Singles Sales (Billboard)	2
US Pop Airplay (Billboard)	33
US Rhythmic Airplay (Billboard)	27

Chart (2013)	Peak position
Japan Hot 100 (Billboard)	49

2021 weekly chart performance for "One More Time"
Chart (2021)	Peak position
Global 200 (Billboard)	164
US Hot Dance/Electronic Songs (Billboard)	9

=== Year-end charts ===
2000 year-end chart performance for "One More Time"
Chart (2000)	Position
France (SNEP)	42
Ireland (IRMA)	99
Italy (Musica e dischi)	65
Netherlands (Dutch Top 40)	195
UK Singles (OCC)	100

2001 year-end chart performance for "One More Time"
Chart (2001)	Position
Australia (ARIA)	60
Australian Dance (ARIA)	3
Austria (Ö3 Austria Top 40)	45
Belgium (Ultratop 50 Wallonia)	39
Canada (Nielsen SoundScan)	6
Canada Radio (Nielsen BDS)	74
Europe (Eurochart Hot 100)	20
France (SNEP)	67
Germany (Media Control)	30
Italy (Musica e dischi)	66
Netherlands (Dutch Top 40)	74
Netherlands (Single Top 100)	99
Switzerland (Schweizer Hitparade)	35
US Dance Club Play (Billboard)	2
US Maxi-Singles Sales (Billboard)	6
US Rhythmic Top 40 (Billboard)	89

2021 year-end chart performance for "One More Time"
Chart (2021)	Position
US Hot Dance/Electronic Songs (Billboard)	82

== Certifications ==
Certifications and sales for "One More Time"
Region	Certification	Certified units/sales
Australia (ARIA)	Gold	35,000^{^}
Belgium (BRMA)	Gold	25,000^{*}
Denmark (IFPI Danmark)	Gold	4,000^{^}
France (SNEP)	Gold	250,000^{*}
Germany (BVMI)	Gold	250,000^{^}
Italy (FIMI) sales since 2009	Platinum	100,000^{‡}
New Zealand (RMNZ)	3× Platinum	90,000^{‡}
Poland (ZPAV)	Gold	25,000^{‡}
Portugal (AFP)	Gold	20,000^{‡}
Spain (Promusicae)	Platinum	60,000^{‡}
Switzerland (IFPI Switzerland)	Gold	25,000^{^}
United Kingdom (BPI)	2× Platinum	1,200,000^{‡}
^{*} Sales figures based on certification alone.^{^} Shipments figures based on certification alone.^{‡} Sales+streaming figures based on certification alone.

== Release history ==
Release dates and formats for "One More Time"
Region	Date	Format(s)	Label(s)	Ref.
Europe	13 November 2000	Single	Virgin	
United States	December 2000	Single	Virgin	
United States	January 2001	Top 40; modern rock; rhythm radio	Virgin	
