= Destroy Rock & Roll (song) =

2005 single by Mylo

Single by Mylo

from the album Destroy Rock & Roll
- Released: 24 January 2005
- Recorded: 2004
- Length: 4:07
- Label: Breastfed Recordings
- Songwriter: Mylo
- Producer: Myles MacInnes

Mylo singles chronology
"Drop the Pressure" (2004)	"Destroy Rock & Roll" (2005)	"In My Arms" (2005)

"Destroy Rock & Roll" is a song by British electronic musician Mylo. It was released as the second single from his debut album of the same name. Produced by Mylo, the song samples the recording "Invocation for Judgement Against and Destruction of Rock Music", released in 1984 by Elizabeth Clare Prophet and her New Age organization Church Universal and Triumphant. Samples from the recording make up the entirety of the song's vocal track, which explicitly lists numerous popular 1980s musicians and bands. The track peaked at #15 on the UK Singles Chart, and also reached the top 40 on the Finnish singles charts.

The song's accompanying music video depicts Mylo in a large white room spraying graffiti art depicting symbols, pictures, or the names of the artists mentioned on the track.

== Composition ==
All of the vocals and lyrics are sampled from "Invocation for Judgement Against and Destruction of Rock Music", a 1984 recording by religious organization Church Universal and Triumphant. The original recording heavily condemns rock music, and many popular artists from the 1980s; it appears on a release entitled The Sounds of American Doomsday Cults Volume 14.

"Destroy Rock & Roll" begins with the voice of a Preacher condemning "All perversions of the third eye through distorted and exaggerated images, perverted movements of the body and breakdancing and other forms of dancing." The same Preacher calls for "the destroying of rock music directed specifically against children through the videos that were portrayed," and "working specifically through" certain individuals. The Preacher also calls for "the judgement of the sacred fire on this hour before the throne of Almighty God" through these individuals.

The Preacher then begins to list down these individuals, most of which are several popular musicians and bands from the 1980s. The reading of the list contributes the rest of the song's vocal track, which is backed by a memorable bass line, as well as drum beats, synthesizer and guitar bursts throughout the entire track.

The same vocal sample was used by Negativland on the song "Michael Jackson" from Escape from Noise.

=== Artists mentioned in the track ===
The artists cited in the list are as follows:

- Michael Jackson
- Prince
- Bruce Springsteen
- Tina Turner
- David Bowie (mispronounced as "boo-wie")
- Van Halen
- Madonna
- Huey Lewis and the News
- The Cars
- Herbie Hancock
- Bonnie Tyler
- Stevie Nicks
- Men at Work
- ZZ Top
- Paul McCartney and Michael Jackson (the two had collaborated on the tracks "The Girl Is Mine" and "Say Say Say")
- "Weird Al" Yankovic
- Cyndi Lauper (mispronounced as "looper")
- Pink Floyd
- The Pretenders
- Billy Joel
- Billy Idol
- Elton John
- Neil Young
- Sheena Easton
- Patty Smyth and Scandal
- Fashion (maybe the track "Fashion" by David Bowie but more the band than the track)
- Big Country
- Morris Day and The Time
- John Lennon (mispronounced "Linen")
- Apollonia 6
- REO Speedwagon
- David Gilmour
- The Rolling Stones
- Pat Benatar
- Hall & Oates
- Wham!
- Rebbie Jackson
- Adam Ant
- Bananarama
- Christine McVie
- Queen
- John Cougar Mellencamp (misnamed as "Jack Cougar Mellencamp")
- U2
- Spheres (speculated to be either singer-songwriter Jimmie Spheeris or jazz ensemble Sphere)
- Fleetwood Mac
- The Alan Parsons Project
- Rick Springfield
- The Thompson Twins
- Missing Persons
- Duran Duran
- The Police
- Eurythmics
- Culture Club "including Boy George"
- Band Aid
- "Relax" (possibly the track "Relax" by Frankie Goes to Hollywood)
- Stevie Wonder

== Track listing ==
=== 7" single (original copies) ===
1. "Destroy Rock 'N' Roll"
2. "Sunworshipper"

=== 7" single (official release) ===
1. "Destroy Rock 'N' Roll"
2. "Give Dance a Chance"

== Charts ==
Chart performance for "Destroy Rock & Roll"
Chart (2005)	Peak position
Australia (ARIA)	56
Finland (Suomen virallinen lista)	13
Ireland (IRMA)	25
UK Singles (Official Charts)	15
UK Dance (Official Charts)	1
