= Live in the Mix =

Studio album by Romanthony
- Released: June 14, 1999
- Recorded: Distance Records
- Genre: Garage house; deep house

Romanthony chronology
Instinctual (1999)	Live in the Mix (1999)	R.Hide in Plain Site (2000)

Professional ratings
Review scores
Source	Rating
Allmusic	link

Live in the Mix is the third album by American garage house producer Romanthony. It was released by Distance Records on June 14, 1999.

== Track listing ==
1. "Intro/DJ Intro"
2. "I Like It"
3. "Dance With Me"
4. "Good Times (Remix)"
5. "Party Times"
6. "Party Buckwild"
7. "Floorpiece"
8. "Under/Main"
9. "Beatrock"
10. "Bring da Beat Back"
11. "I Like It"
12. "Sommore"
13. "Down 4 U"
14. "Drifting Solidly [*]"
