= Jersey Street =

Jersey Street is a band from Manchester, England, which began releasing deep house in 1998, before broadening its output to include a wide range of styles including soul, jazz, afro-funk and Latin. Jersey Street’s first single, "Nobody But My Lord", was released on J.B.O. in 1998. It was followed by two albums, Step Into The Light and After The Rain, for Glasgow Underground Recordings, which were released in 2000 and 2002 respectively. The band also released singles for labels including Yellow Productions, Out of the Loop Records, Mr Bongo Records, Naked Records, Hed Kandi, Defected Records, and Electric Chair Records, PIAS Recordings.

Jersey Street began with founding producer Neil Reid with vocalist Dawn Zee in 1997, and Steve Chesney (engineer/co-producer) and other members joined the fold – primarily Matt Steele (keyboards/producer), Jasper Wilkinson (bass, saxophone and guitar). The band's production aesthetic increasingly reflected the funk, soul and disco influences on house. Since its inception, Jersey Street has used an increasing amount of live instrumentation, including bass, guitars, horn sections and strings, as well as a looser approach to technology which made its grooves less rigid and unyielding than those of some contemporaries. The growing use of live musicians led to a string of dates as a nine-piece band, at venues including London's Cargo and Manchester's Band on the Wall.

Despite receiving acclaim from the dance music fraternity – and from underground music lovers in general – Jersey Street has never crossed over to a more general audience. The band continues to release tracks intermittently, under its own name and also using the name Fumi, and various members have contributed to the albums and live performances of artists such as New Order and the Brand New Heavies.
