= Tamara Barnett-Herrin =

English singer-songwriter

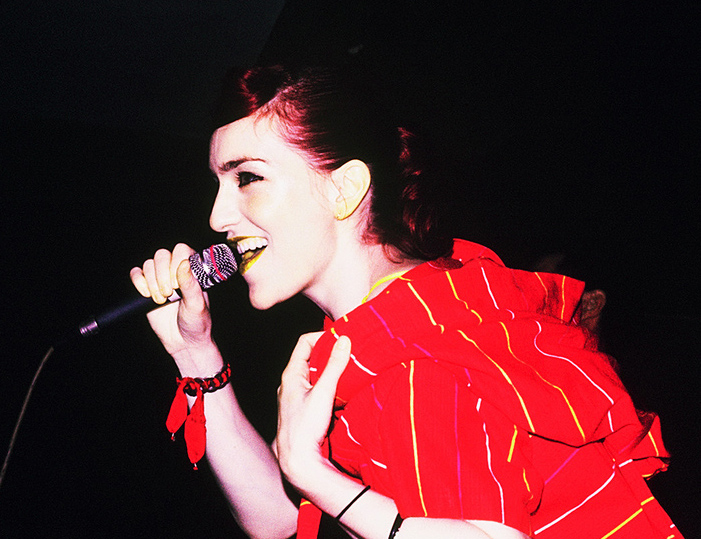
- Barnett-Herrin performing with Freeform Five at 93 Feet East in London

Background information
- Origin: London, England
- Genres: Electronic, house
- Occupation(s): Singer, songwriter
- Instrument: Vocals
- Years active: 2000–present
- Website: Calendar Songs (2021 Archive)

Tamara Barnett-Herrin is an English singer and songwriter, who has sung with the group Freeform Five on the album Strangest Things, which was released in 2005. A later project is the Calendar Songs album, an internet-based collaborative CC BY-NC-licensed project released in early 2008.

Barnett-Herrin contributed vocals to "State of Permission", a track on Shinichi Osawa's 2007 album, The One.

== Performance ==
In 2010, Barnett-Herrin collaborated with artist Mai-Thu Perret on two projects: The Ballad of a Russian Doll, with Nigel Hoyle, a performance at the Migros Museum, Zurich, for the exhibition While Bodies Get Mirrored; and the prizewinning short film In Darkness Let Me Dwell, created with the assistance of the Swiss Graduate School of Public Administration (IDHEAP) in Lausanne.

In 2011, she performed in and composed songs for the ballet Love Letters in Ancient Brick, choreographed by Mai-Thu Perret and Laurence Yadi, based on George Herriman's Krazy Kat comic strip. The premiere took place on 17 March 2011 at Theatre de l'Usine, Geneva, and the production travelled to New York for Performa 11 in November 2011, at the Joyce Theatre Soho.

In June 2011, she composed two songs for a special performance at the Aargauer Kunsthaus in Aarau, Switzerland, to mark Mai-Thu Perret's solo exhibition The Adding Machine. The exhibition catalogue featured an exclusive 7-inch vinyl, featuring her performance of the ukulele version of John Dowland's "In darkness let me dwell" and a cover of Mai-Thu Perret and Steven Parrino's "Spider Song", featuring Nigel George Hoyle on guitar.

== Calendar Songs ==
Calendar Songs began in October 2006 and ran to September 2007, with Barnett-Herrin releasing one original song on the Calendar Songs website every month inspired by events that month. The vocals and a minimalist backing track were available on the website as well as ccMixter for download, so that anyone could re-mix the song, and upload it to the website. In May 2008, Calendar Girl released Calendar Songs—Remixes Volume 1, featuring 12 chosen remixes, one for each month.

In 2008, Magnatune recording artist Four Stones included a remix of the Calendar Songs vocal for "July" on his album Chronic Dreams 2.

In connection with the Calendar Songs project, Barnett-Herrin made her a capella tracks and simple instrumental tracks available pursuant to the CC BY-NC license, permitting remixers to make non-commercial uses of her songs.

== Discography/album appearances ==
- Destroy Rock & Roll, Mylo (2004)
- Strangest Things, Freeform Five (2005)
- State of Permission, "The One", Shinichi Osawa (2007)
- Calendar Songs (2008)
- Karlation by Karla (2011)
- Born to Burn (2012)
- Infatuation, Cage & Aviary (2012)
