= Mylo =

Scottish DJ and producer (born 1978)

- Born: Myles MacInnes; 10 May 1978 (age 48); Broadford, Isle of Skye, Scotland
- Genres: Electronic; house; nu-disco; trip hop
- Occupations: Record producer, DJ
- Instruments: Keyboards, drum programming, guitar
- Years active: 2004–present
- Labels: Breastfed Recordings; Ministry of Sound Australia

Myles MacInnes (born 10 May 1978), better known by his stage name Mylo, is a Scottish electronic musician and record producer. His 2004 album Destroy Rock & Roll peaked at number 26 on the UK Albums Chart. He is best known for his 2005 single "Doctor Pressure", a mashup of his own track "Drop the Pressure" and Miami Sound Machine's 1984 song "Dr. Beat"; it peaked at number 3 on the UK Singles Chart.

== Early life and education ==
MacInnes was educated at Portree High School on the Isle of Skye and followed this with a scholarship at George Watson's College, a private school in Morningside, Edinburgh. After completing his Certificate of Sixth Year Studies, with one course in chemistry and four in mathematics, MacInnes gained admission and matriculated to the University of Edinburgh. MacInnes had no plans after high school and initially wanted to lay bricks in Australia, but was unable to obtain a visa.

At the University of Edinburgh, MacInnes studied mathematics, taking second-year mathematics classes in his first year. Submitting an open application, he then applied to study mathematics and philosophy at the University of Oxford and was allocated Brasenose College. In 1999, MacInnes graduated in psychology, philosophy and physiology with a first-class degree.

MacInnes then commenced studies for a PhD in philosophy at the University of California, Los Angeles but returned the next year to produce music, starting work on his album Destroy Rock & Roll.

His brother, Hector, is songwriter and guitarist for the band Injuns. He also toured with Mylo throughout 2005 - serving his touring role on electronic drums.

MacInnes's son was born in 2012.

== Career ==
Mylo released his debut album, Destroy Rock & Roll in 2004, on the Breastfed Recordings label, which he co-owns. He produced the album on a computer in his own bedroom. Mylo has said that his label turned down fellow Scottish DJ Calvin Harris.

He has provided remixes for Scissor Sisters ("Mary"), Amy Winehouse ("Fuck Me Pumps"), the Knife ("You Take My Breath Away"), the Killers ("Somebody Told Me"), Sia ("Breathe Me") and Moby ("Lift Me Up"). One of his works was a 2004 remix of Kylie Minogue's No. 2 UK hit, "I Believe in You", which appeared on the single that peaked at No. 3 on the US Hot Dance Club Play chart. His biggest chart success to date came in the autumn of 2005. This was when the single "Doctor Pressure", a mash-up of his own song "Drop the Pressure" and Miami Sound Machine's "Dr. Beat", peaked at No. 3 on the UK Singles Chart. The single performed well in the US, especially on the Hot Dance Airplay and Hot Dance Club Play charts, where it jointly made the top 10.

"Muscle Cars", the follow-up single to "Doctor Pressure", was a hit in the UK and European dance charts, reaching No. 1 on the UK Club Chart in November 2005, and No. 38 on the UK Singles Chart. The video that accompanied the single courted controversy as it featured two supposed Chinese spies – actually played by British actors Bruce Wang and Alex Liang – inventing an electronic fly to spy on the American president, George W. Bush. Mylo did not appear in the video.

In 2005, Mylo released a DJ mix titled Mylo's Rough Guide to Rave which was released as a covermount CD in Mixmag.

He contributed to a song, "Mars Needs Women", to the War Child compilation album Help!: A Day in the Life, released in September 2005, and was also featured on the Canadian compilation album, MuchDance 2007, released in November 2006. In 2006, the track "Otto's Journey" was used in a television commercial for Kraft Zesty Italian Dressing, featuring Olympic figure skater Michelle Kwan.

BBC Radio 1 played a world exclusive of a track by Mylo on 23 January 2009. The title of the track is unconfirmed, however Radio 1 referred to it as "I'm Back", because, as Annie Mac stated, "he (Mylo) sent it to us with the file titled I'm Back". The same month, he released another DJ mix album cover mount in an issue of Mixmag, this time it was called The Return of Mylo, which contained his new song "Wings of Fire".

Mylo performed at the opening ceremony of the 2014 Commonwealth Games in Glasgow.

In June 2016, Mylo released previews of new music. He said that undisclosed legal reasons were the explanation for his hiatus.

== Discography ==
=== Albums ===
List of albums, with selected details and chart positions
Title	Album details	Peak chart positions					
Title	Album details	UK	AUS	BEL (FL)	FRA	NLD	US Dance
Destroy Rock & Roll	Released: 2004; Re-released: 2005	26	73	56	101	89	10

=== Mix albums ===
- Mylo's Rough Guide to Rave (2005, free in Mixmag)
- The Return of Mylo (2009, free in Mixmag)

=== Singles ===
Title	Year	Peak chart positions									
Title	Year	UK	AUS	AUT	BEL (FL)	DEN	FIN	FRA	GER	IRE	NLD
"Drop the Pressure"	2004	19	46	—	27	—	—	34	43	32	32
"Destroy Rock & Roll"	2005	15	56	—	—	—	13	—	—	25	—
"In My Arms"	2005	13	25	—	23	20	—	—	61	22	82
"Doctor Pressure" (vs. Miami Sound Machine)	2005	3	12	50	9	15	10	30	31	5	23
"Muscle Car" (featuring Freeform Five)	2006	38	52	—	44	—	14	—	—	26	—
