= Freeform Five =

English electronic music group

- Origin: London, England
- Genres: Electronic; house
- Years active: 1997–present
- Label: Perspex Recordings
- Members: Anu Pillai
- Past members: Tamara Barnett-Herrin; Cabba Forster Jones; Nick Decosemo
- Website: freeformfive.co.uk anupillai.com

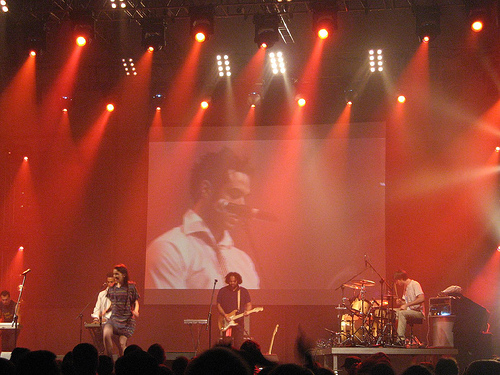
FreeformFive

Freeform Five is an English electronic group led by DJ, producer and songwriter Anu Pillai.

== Biography ==
Freeform Five became known for their remix of Isolee's "Beau Mot Plage" in 1999.

The Freeform Five DJ mix albums Bisous Bisous II and Misch Masch were released in 2005 and 2006. Over the years, Pillai has remixed tracks by artists such as N*E*R*D, Brian Wilson, X-Press 2 and David Byrne, Jamie Lidell, Justin Timberlake, Felix Da Housecat and the Killers. Freeform Five continue to perform at clubs like Fabric (London), Manumission (Ibiza), Week End (Berlin), Razz (Barcelona), Paris Paris (Paris), Lux (Lisbon) and has toured in Australia, Scandinavia, North America, Mexico, Brazil and Japan.

The 2004 studio album Strangest Things followed a series of vinyl-only releases including "Perspex Sex", "Electromagnetic" and "Eeeeaaooww". The song "No More Conversations" was re-released in 2007 with a new Mylo remix.

In addition to his own work, Pillai has written and produced with other artists such as Lewis Capaldi, Ladyhawke (musician), Lana Del Rey, and Little Boots. He has composed music for commercials for Apple Inc., Nike, Inc., Mercedes-Benz, SEAT, Verizon, Eurostar, and the BBC, amongst others.

Along with Roy Kerr, Pillai has released three EPs on Fool's Gold Records, the label founded by A-Trak. He also releases and remixes songs by other artists on his record label Perspex Recordings.

== Discography ==
=== Albums ===
- Strangest Things Studio Album – 2004 Atlantic Records / 2005
- Misch Masch DJ Mix Album – 2005 Fine

Fine/Perspex Recordings (reissue)

- Bisous Bisous II DJ Mix Album – 2006 Perspex Recordings

=== Singles ===
- "One Day" (1997)
- "Cocoa Star" (1998)
- "Hustling" (1998)
- "Break Me" (2000)
- "Perspex Sex" (2001)
- "Electromagnetic" (2003)
- "Strangest Things" (2004)
- "Eeeeaaooww" (2004)
- "No More Conversations" (2005)
- "Muscle Car" (Mylo feat. Freeform Five) (2006) #38 UK
- "No More Conversations" (reissue) (2007)
- "Weltareh" Feat. Juldeh Camara (2012)
- "Brandy Alexander" (2013)
- "Leviathan" Feat. Róisín Murphy (2014)
- "Throwing Stones" with Ali Love (2017)

=== Freeform reform remixes ===
- Ayumi hamasaki – 'alterna'
- Legowelt – 'Disco Rout'
- Snow Patrol – 'Set the Fire to the Third Bar'
- Wahoo – 'Damn'
- Revl9n – 'Someone Like You'
- The Killers – 'When You Were Young'
- Justin Timberlake – 'SexyBack'
- The Delays – 'Valentine'
- Jamie Lidell – 'When I Come Back Around'
- Lindstrom – 'I Feel Space'
- Gabriel Ananda – 'Ihre Personliche Glucksmelodie'
- Alice Smith – 'Love Endeavour'
- P!nk – 'Stupid Girl'
- Soul Mekanik – 'Never Touch That Switch'
- Mylo – 'Muscle Car'
- Alter Ego – 'Beat the Bush'
- Elton John – 'Are You Ready For Love'
- Arsenal – 'Switch'
- Funk Lowlives – 'Time Traveller Man'
- Futureheads – 'Decent Days and Nights'
- Brian Wilson – 'Our Prayer'
- Felix Da Housecat – 'Rocket Ride'
- N*E*R*D – 'Lapdance'
- Truby Trio – 'Hi Jazz'
- Will Young -'Switch It On'
- Llorca – 'Indigo Blues'
- J Majik – 'Love Is Not A Game'
- Markus Nikolai – 'Bushes'
- X-Press 2 – 'Lazy (feat. David Byrne)'
- Annie – 'The Greatest Hit'
- Isolee – 'Brazil.com'
- Cricco Castelli – 'Streetlife'
- Destiny's Child – 'Bootylicious'
- Tim Hutton – 'Colours'
- Nitin Sawhney – 'Homelands'
- Isolee – 'Beau Mot Plage'
- Deadmau5 – 'The Veldt'
