= House of 909 =

British deep house group and record label

House of 909 is a UK deep house group and house music record label formed in 1995. The group consists of performers Nigel Casey, Trevor Loveys, and Affie Yussuf. The group, which has been called a "collective", also involves record production contributions from Jamie Cox and Martin Howes. The group uses Nigel Casey's House of 909 label for its releases. The label's "Voices from Beyond", "Future Soul Orchestra", and "Shakedown" all had mid-1990s dance club hits in the UK. House of 909 has been considered as influential on the UK DJ and club scene as fellow Brits Basement Jaxx.

== History ==
The group emerged from Nigel Casey's DJ work on the UK's southern coast in the 1980s and the early 1990s. Casey was an influential house music DJ during this period. One of his early self-founded record labels was 909 Perversions Records, which Casey launched after working with artist Affie Yussuf. Prior to working with Casey, Yussuf had recorded tracks for Force Inc. Like Casey, Yussuf also had a self-founded label, in Yussuf's case called Ferox.

After Casey and Yussuf worked together, in 1995 they recruited the producers from Soul Rebels After, Trevor Loveys and Jamie Cox. With these four artists/producers, they launched House of 909 Records in 1996. The first records from the label were EPs from Future Soul Orchestra and Voices from Beyond. These EPs had deep house style that were influenced by US artists Larry Heard and Deep Dish. Pagan Records negotiated a deal to license the House of 909 label's "Deep Distraction" EP. The House of 909 label released a mix collection entitled "Soul Rebels" in 1997. The House of 909 group released their first album in 1998, "The Children We Were".
