= In My Arms (Mylo song) =

2005 single by Mylo

Single by Mylo

from the album Destroy Rock & Roll
- Released: 16 May 2005
- Genre: Pop
- Length: 3:46
- Label: Breastfed
- Songwriter(s): Jackie DeShannon; George Merrill; Shannon Rubicam; Donna Weiss
- Producer(s): Myles MacInnes

Mylo singles chronology
"Destroy Rock & Roll" (2005)	"In My Arms" (2005)	"Doctor Pressure" (2005)

"In My Arms" is a song by the Scottish electronic dance musician Mylo. The song appears on the album Destroy Rock & Roll and was released as a single in the UK on 16 May 2005. It contains samples from "Bette Davis Eyes" by Kim Carnes, and "Waiting for a Star to Fall" by Boy Meets Girl.

== Music video ==
The song's music video was filmed in Los Angeles. The video opens with a woman departing a bus and waiting for someone to arrive. In a separate scene, a man is shown getting dressed and leaving his apartment while an unidentified person sleeps in the bed beside him. The man drives to where the woman is waiting, who approaches him pointing at her eye, her chest, then at him, giving an "I love you" gesture. The two kiss, and then depart, driving around the city before changing clothes in a parking lot. They then drive to a liquor store on Echo Park Avenue, where they purchase some items, then drive to a party.

At the party, the man comes downstairs and the woman gives him another "I love you" gesture. The two dance for a while before walking back to an apartment. They head inside, kissing the whole time, and the two undress. The scene then shows the man getting out of bed, mirroring the scene from the start of the video. The unidentified person rolls over, and it's revealed to be the woman from the bus. The man returns the "I love you" gesture, then departs in the exact same way as before, showing that his day is just a loop.

== Track listings ==
12-inch

1. "In My Arms" (Sharam Jey Remix)
2. "In My Arms" (King Unique Re-edit)
3. "In My Arms" (Linus Love Remix)
4. "In My Arms" (M.A.N.D.Y Remix)

7-inch

1. "In My Arms (Radio edit)
2. "In My Arms (Poplar Computer Remix)

== Charts ==
Chart performance for "In My Arms"
Chart (2005)	Peak position
Australia (ARIA)	25
Belgium (Ultratop 50 Flanders)	23
Belgium (Ultratip Bubbling Under Wallonia)	2
Denmark (Tracklisten)	20
Germany (GfK)	61
Ireland (IRMA)	22
Netherlands (Single Top 100)	82
Scotland (OCC)	11
UK Singles (OCC)	13
