= Destroy Rock & Roll =

2004 studio album by Mylo

Studio album by Mylo
- Released: 24 May 2004
- Recorded: November 2003–April 2004 (Tracks 1–14); August 2004–July 2005 (Tracks 15–17 Limited Edition)
- Studio: Various locations in Scotland
- Genres: House; electropop
- Length: 55:01
- Label: Breastfed
- Producer: Myles MacInnes

Mylo chronology
Destroy Rock & Roll (2004)	Mylo's Rough Guide to Rave (2005)

Singles from Destroy Rock & Roll
- 1. "Muscle Cars" Released: 26 April 2004; 2. "Valley of the Dolls"/"Continental Love" Released: 23 August 2004; 3. "Drop the Pressure" Released: 18 October 2004; 4. "Destroy Rock & Roll" Released: 24 January 2005; 5. "In My Arms" Released: 16 May 2005; 6. "Doctor Pressure" Released: 5 September 2005; 7. "Musclecar (Reform Reprise)" Released: 9 January 2006

Destroy Rock & Roll is the debut and only album (One-Album Wonder) by Scottish record producer and DJ Mylo (real name Myles MacInnes), released in 2004.

The album samples a few 1960s songs and many 1970s and 1980s soft rock songs that Mylo heard on the radio as a child. The single "In My Arms" combines hits by Kim Carnes and Boy Meets Girl. The title track samples a fundamentalist Christian sermon, while "Drop the Pressure" is based around a vocal recording made by Mylo himself and edited with a vocoder.

The album was re-released in 2005, and peaked at number 26 on the UK Albums Chart. The re-released contained a new remix of "Drop the Pressure", called "Doctor Pressure" (vs. Miami Sound Machine), which was also a number 3 single.

== Background and production ==
Many of the album's tracks come from 1970s and 1980s radio-friendly soft rock. Mylo grew up on the remote Isle of Skye, where in his childhood the only available radio station was Ireland-based Atlantic 252, which played such music. After being exposed to the first time to house music on the radio, and having expanded his musical influences while studying in Los Angeles, he committed himself to music at the age of 22.

In 2002, while working as a journalist for the BBC in Glasgow, Mylo heard the Christian fundamentalist sermon that was sampled in his first track, "Destroy Rock & Roll". He also made a song sampling Toto's "Salt Lake", for which the rights were never cleared. He rejected Wall of Sound and Echo to form his own label, Breastfed.

The one vocal line on "Drop the Pressure" was recorded by Mylo himself and then put through a vocoder. The line starts off low in pitch before getting higher and higher, until becoming what Mylo called "quite an unsubtle pisstake of vocoder music in a way". "In My Arms" samples "Bette Davis Eyes" by Kim Carnes and "Waiting for a Star to Fall" by Boy Meets Girl. Mylo initially thought that its concept was the same as the 2004 number-one single "Take Me to the Clouds Above" that mashes up popular songs by U2 and Whitney Houston – a song he considered "absolute cack". He considered leaving it off the album until people reacted positively to it.

Many copyright owners of the original tracks demanded at least 50% of the rights to the new tracks. For this reason, on several tracks on Destroy Rock & Roll, the cheaper option of re-recording the original music was employed. This was the case for the use of "Bette Davis Eyes" on "In My Arms", due to the requirement to offer 50% to the holders of "Waiting for a Star to Fall". Conversely, a sampled grunt from the Prince song "Kiss" on "Guilty of Love" was ineligible for copyright due to its brevity.

== Reception ==
Professional ratings
Aggregate scores
Source	Rating
Metacritic	80/100
Review scores
Source	Rating
AllMusic	4/5 stars
Entertainment Weekly	A−
The Guardian	2/5 stars
The Independent	5/5 stars
The Irish Times	3/5 stars
Pitchfork	8.4/10
Q	4/5 stars
Rolling Stone	3.5/5 stars
Uncut	1.5/5 stars
URB	4/5 stars

Review aggregator Metacritic gives Destroy Rock & Roll a score of 80/100 from 14 reviews by music critics. Tim DiGravina of AllMusic gave the album four stars out of five, finding cohesiveness among Mylo's different influences and concluding that it "only seems to cement his status among the elite of electronic cut-and-pasters of his time". A rare negative review came from Dave Simpson in The Guardian, who did not find that the album's quality matched its provocative title: "There are moments of promise when Mylo ups the pace, but rock'n'roll faces a greater threat from a feather duster".

Elton John endorsed the album on an appearance on Friday Night with Jonathan Ross, saying that "every home should own a copy". The album was included in the book 1001 Albums You Must Hear Before You Die. It was named the 21st best album of the decade by Resident Advisor.

== Track listing ==
All tracks written by Mylo (aka Myles Macinnes); additional songwriters are mentioned in parentheses.

1. "Valley of the Dolls" (Stu Phillips, Bob Stone) – 3:26
2. "Sunworshipper" (Maxime Le Forestier, Hubert Rostaing, Martin Green, Jonny Trunk) – 3:26
3. "Muscle Cars" – 3:39
4. "Drop the Pressure" – 4:15
5. "In My Arms" (George Merrill, Shannon Rubicam, Jackie DeShannon) – 3:46
6. "Guilty of Love" (George Duke) – 3:06
7. "Paris Four Hundred" – 3:32
8. "Destroy Rock & Roll" – 4:07
9. "Rikki" (Rickie Lee Jones) – 3:18
10. "Otto's Journey" – 3:58
11. "Musclecar (Reform Reprise)" (Anu Pillai) – 3:53
12. "Zenophile" (Cy Coleman, Dorothy Fields) – 4:08
13. "Need You Tonite" (Judie Tzuke, Mike Paxman) – 4:51
14. "Emotion 98.6" – 5:36

Limited edition bonus tracks

15. "Soft Rock" – 4:01
16. "Doctor Pressure" (Dirty Radio Edit) (Enrique E. Garcia) – 3:24
  (samples "Dr. Beat" by Miami Sound Machine featuring Gloria Estefan)
17. "Destroy Rock & Roll" (Tom Neville Clean Edit) – 4:43

Samples

- Track 1 samples "Beyond the Valley of the Dolls" by The Sandpipers.
- Track 2 samples "Si Tu étais Né en Mai" by Maxime Le Forestier and "The Sunworshippers Speak" by The Sunworshippers.
- Track 5 samples "Bette Davis Eyes" by Kim Carnes and "Waiting for a Star to Fall" by Boy Meets Girl. The original recording is used on the UK release. The "Bette Davis Eyes" sample is replayed on a Juno synth.
- Track 6 samples "Guilty" by George Duke from his 1989 LP, Night After Night and “Kiss” by Prince from his 1986 studio album, Parade. The UK release samples the original recording.
- Track 8 is based on samples of "Invocation for Judgement Against and Destruction of Rock Music" by the Church Universal and Triumphant. The UK release samples the original recording while the US release features a replay.
- Track 9 samples "Living It Up" by Rickie Lee Jones.
- Track 11 is remixed by X-Press 2 and Anu Pillai from Freeform Five. "They loved the record so much they both called up asking to remix it for free."
- Track 12 samples "Where Am I Going?" by Dusty Springfield, from her 1967 album of the same name.
- Track 13 samples "Stay with Me till Dawn" by Judie Tzuke.
- The beginning of the limited edition track 15 samples the opening of "Nothing's Gonna Stop Us Now" by Starship.
- Track 16 of the limited edition has the mashup containing a sample of the 1984 and 2004 songs "Drop the Pressure" and "Dr. Beat" by Mylo and Miami Sound Machine respectively.

== Personnel ==
Credits adapted from the liner notes for both the UK and US editions.

- Myles MacInnes – vocals (4, 16), production (all tracks), recording engineer (3–7, 9–16), musical arrangement, mixing (16), additional instruments (1, 5), music programming
- Tamara Barnett-Herrin (of Freeform Five) – lead vocals (11)
- John Clark – additional production, recording engineer, mixing (8), additional instruments, music programming (1, 2, 5, 6, 12)
- Nick Decosemo (of Freeform Five) – background vocals (11)
- Cabba Forester-Jones (of Freeform Five) – background vocals (11)
- Freeform Five – guest appearance (11)
- Marj Hogarth – additional vocals (1, 5)
- Kevin Kennedy – additional production (1, 2, 5, 6, 8, 12), additional guitar, music editing (17), additional instruments, music programming (1, 2, 5, 6, 12), recording engineer (1–2, 8, 12; additional on 3–7, 9–11, 13, 14), mixing (all tracks)
- Linus Loves – additional production, recording engineer, mixing (8), additional instruments, music programming (1, 2, 5, 6, 12)
- Aldo Martin – producer (5)
- Tom Neville – additional production (17), remixing (17)
- Phantom – art direction, design
- Anu Pillai (of Freeform Five) – additional producer (11), background vocals (11)
- Dan Russell – additional vocals (8)
- William Threlfall – additional production (1, 2, 5), guitar (1, additional on 15), additional instruments, music programming (5), recording engineer (1, 2; additional on 5, 6, 11, 13, 14), mixing (1, 2, 5, 6, 11, 13, 14)
- Tom Urie – additional vocals (1, 5)

== Charts ==
Chart performance for Destroy Rock & Roll
Chart (2004–2006)	Peak position
Australian Albums (ARIA)	73
Belgian Albums (Ultratop Flanders)	56
Dutch Albums (Album Top 100)	89
French Albums (SNEP)	101
Scottish Albums (Official Charts)	50
UK Albums (Official Charts)	26
US Top Dance Albums (Billboard)	10

== Certifications and sales ==
Region	Certification	Certified units/sales
Ireland (IRMA)	Platinum	15,000^{^}
Russia (NFPF)	Gold	10,000^{*}
United Kingdom (BPI)	Gold	100,000^{^}
Summaries
Europe	—	250,000
Worldwide	—	300,000
^{*} Sales figures based on certification alone.^{^} Shipments figures based on certification alone.
