= Doctor Pressure =

2005 single by Mylo and Miami Sound Machine

- Australian maxi single cover

Single by Mylo vs. Miami Sound Machine

from the album Destroy Rock & Roll
- Released: 5 September 2005
- Length: 3:24
- Label: Sony BMG; Breastfed
- Songwriters: Myles MacInnes; Elias Enrique Garcia
- Producer: MacInnes

Mylo singles chronology
"In My Arms" (2004)	"Doctor Pressure" (2005)	"Muscle Cars" (2005)

Gloria Estefan singles chronology
"Tu Fotografía" (2004)	"Doctor Pressure" (2005)	"No Llores" (2007)

Music video
- "Doctor Pressure" on Vimeo

"Doctor Pressure" is a mash-up song by Mylo and Miami Sound Machine, from the re-issue of Mylo's debut studio album Destroy Rock & Roll (2004). The song was written by Elias Enrique Garcia and the producer Mylo. It was released by Sony BMG and Breastfed Recordings on 5 September 2005, as the sixth single from the album. Initially created as a bootleg recording by Phil 'N' Dog, the mashup contains a sample of the songs "Drop the Pressure" and "Dr. Beat" by Mylo and Miami Sound Machine respectively.

"Doctor Pressure" peaked at number three on the UK Singles Chart, number five on the Irish Singles Chart, and at number 12 on the Australian ARIA Singles Chart. An accompanying music video was directed by Hexstatic member Stuart Warren Hill and released in 2005, which uses a DVJ to scratch and insert footage. The video is considered to be one of the first official mashup videos, while the song was later sampled by One Bit and Noah Cyrus on "My Way".

== Background and release ==
Mylo released the electro song "Drop the Pressure" in October 2004, which was included on his debut studio album Destroy Rock & Roll (2004). During its production, Mylo used Reason 2.5 to incorporate a vocoder module in the song. Phil 'N' Dog released a bootleg recording titled "Doctor Pressure" that spliced "Drop the Pressure" with Miami Sound Machine's 1984 song "Dr. Beat", which Mylo then made minor alterations to the song. "Doctor Pressure" was written by Elias Enrique Garcia and the producer Mylo, while it was mastered by John Davis at Alchemy Soho. The song contains a sample of "Dr. Beat", which is included in a mashup with "Drop the Pressure".

"Doctor Pressure" was released as the sixth single from the re-issue of Destroy Rock N Roll on 5 September 2005, which included three new songs. Both Sony BMG and Breastfed Recordings believed that the song would introduce the album to a wider audience. Writing for the National Post in 2007, Maryam Siddiqi stated that fans of the dance genre would "[clap] their hands for more" mashups such as "Doctor Pressure".

== Commercial performance ==
"Doctor Pressure" debuted at the number three peak on the UK Singles Chart dated 11 September 2005, with 19,881 copies sold in the first week. The song subsequently peaked higher than both "Dr. Beat" and "Drop the Pressure" on the chart, and remained for 26 weeks. It remains both Mylo and Gloria Estefan's highest-charting song on the UK Singles Chart. It was eventually certified gold by the British Phonographic Industry (BPI) on 25 August 2023 for track-equivalent sales of 400,000 units. In Ireland, "Doctor Pressure" debuted on the Irish Singles Chart dated 8 September 2005, entering at number five and remained on the chart for 11 weeks. It additionally debuted at the number five peak on the Scottish Singles Chart dated 11 September 2005. On the Australian ARIA Singles Chart, "Doctor Pressure" peaked at number 12 and remained on the chart for 17 weeks.

== Music video and legacy ==
An accompanying music video was released in 2005 and directed by Stuart Warren Hill of English electronic music duo Hexstatic. Warren Hill utilized a DVJ to scratch sections, with the footage inserted in the video's cut. Chris Mugan of The Independent acknowledged that it is "one of the first officially sanctioned mash-up visuals" along with Addictive TV's video for "Rapture Riders", a mashup of Blondie's 1981 song "Rapture" and the Doors' 1971 song "Riders on the Storm". In 2017, British duo One Bit and American singer Noah Cyrus sampled "Doctor Pressure" on the song "My Way", which consequently sampled "Drop the Pressure" too. Writing for The Fader, Owen Myers stated that Cyrus' "full-bodied" vocals modernised "Drop the Pressure".

== Track listings ==
UK CD single 1

1. "Doctor Pressure" (Clean Radio Edit) – 3:24
2. "Drop the Pressure" (Clean Radio Edit) – 3:14

UK CD single 2
Australian maxi single (released 26 September 2005)

1. "Doctor Pressure" (Dirty Radio Edit) – 3:26
2. "Doctor Pressure" (Dirty Club Mix) – 5:40
3. "Drop the Pressure" (Club Mix) – 5:14
4. "Drop the Pressure" (Rex the Dog Remix) – 7:03
5. "Drop the Pressure" (Stanton Warriors Remix) – 4:47

German maxi-CD single (released 9 December 2005)

1. "Doctor Pressure" (Dirty Radio Edit) – 3:24
2. "Doctor Pressure" (Clean Radio Edit) – 3:24
3. "Doctor Pressure" (Clean Club Mix) – 5:39
4. "Doctor Pressure" (Dirty Club Mix) – 5:39

== Credits and personnel ==
Credits are adapted from the back cover of "Doctor Pressure".

Recording

- Contains a sample of "Dr. Beat" by Miami Sound Machine featuring Gloria Estefan
- Mastered at Alchemy Soho
- "Doctor Pressure" was originally conceived by Phil 'N' Dog

Personnel

- Myles MacInnes – producing, mixing, arranging
- Elias Enrique Garcia – songwriting
- John Davis – mastering

== Charts ==
=== Weekly charts ===
Weekly chart performance for "Doctor Pressure"
Chart (2005–2006)	Peak position
Australia (ARIA)	12
Australian Dance (ARIA)	2
Austria (Ö3 Austria Top 40)	50
Belgium (Ultratop 50 Flanders)	9
Belgium (Ultratop 50 Wallonia)	13
Belgium Dance (Ultratop Flanders)	1
Denmark (Tracklisten)	15
Europe (Eurochart Hot 100)	8
Finland (Suomen virallinen lista)	10
France (SNEP)	30
Germany (GfK)	31
Hungary (Rádiós Top 40)	35
Hungary (Dance Top 40)	22
Ireland (IRMA)	5
Netherlands (Dutch Top 40)	17
Netherlands (Single Top 100)	23
Scottish Singles Sales (Official Charts)	5
Sweden (Sverigetopplistan)	52
Switzerland (Schweizer Hitparade)	66
UK Singles (Official Charts)	3
UK Dance (Official Charts)	1

=== Year-end charts ===
2005 year-end chart performance for "Doctor Pressure"
Chart (2005)	Position
Australian Dance (ARIA)	12
Europe (Eurochart Hot 100)	95
UK Singles (OCC)	39

2006 year-end chart performance for "Doctor Pressure"
Chart (2006)	Position
Australian Dance (ARIA)	36

== Certifications ==
Certifications and sales for "Doctor Pressure"
Region	Certification	Certified units/sales
United Kingdom (BPI)	Gold	400,000^{‡}
^{‡} Sales+streaming figures based on certification alone.
