= Ball and chain =

Physical restraint device

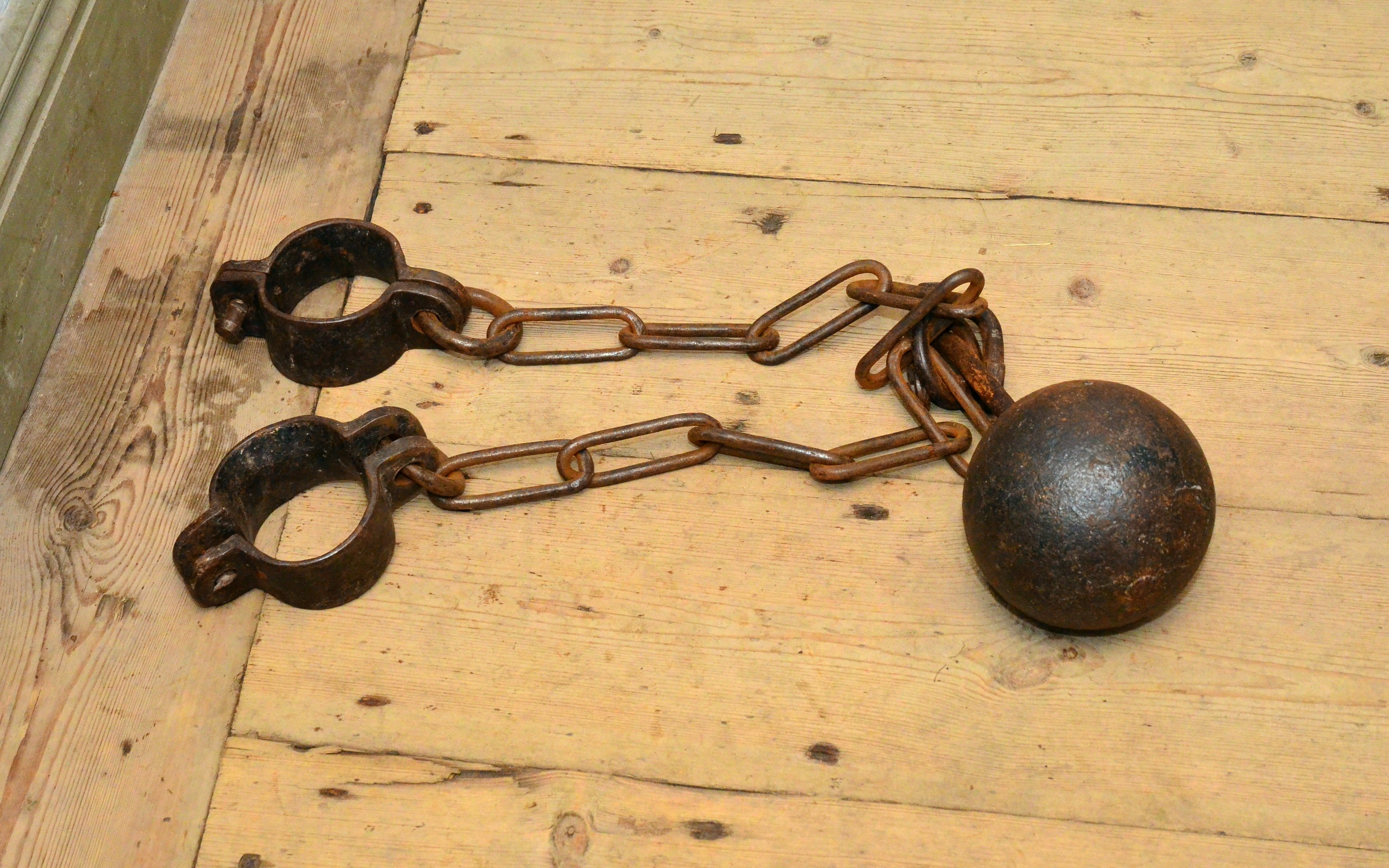
Ball and chains for both legs, Sagalunds museum, Finland.

A ball and chain (also known as leg irons) is a physical restraint device historically used to bind prisoners of both adolescent and adult ages. Their use was prevalent in the Americas. From the 17th century until as late as the mid-20th century this form of punishment was often used in conjunction with other methods of confinement.

A type of shackle, the ball and chain is designed so that the weight of the iron ball at the end of the short chain restricts and limits the pace at which its wearer is able to move, making any attempt at escape much more difficult. The weight of the ball would typically be determined by the court, typically ranging from five to twenty-five pounds (2.27-11.34 kg).

In modern times, it is mostly associated with cartoon depiction of criminals, much like the striped prison uniform.

== See also ==
- Electronic tagging
