= Mateo & Matos =

American deejays and house music producers

- Origin: New York, United States
- Genres: House
- Years active: 1986–present
- Labels: King Street Sounds (1995); Glasgow Underground Recordings (1997); Spiritual Life Music (1998); West End Records (2006)
- Members: John "Roc" Mateo; Eddie "E-Z" Matos
- Website: www.myspace.com/mateomatos

Mateo & Matos is a team of two American deejays and house music producers, John "Roc" Mateo and Eddie "E-Z" Matos, from New York City, United States.

== History ==
John "Roc" Mateo and Eddie "E-Z" Matos were both influenced by late 1970s disco. Mateo started by broadcasting sets over his CB radio in 1985, and it was through this self-produced show that Matos first contacted him. They became friends and shortly afterward became professional partners. Their inspirations include Larry Levan, Tony Humphries, Shep Pettibone and Little Louie Vega. They were introduced to Vega later that year, learning about studio production and engineering from him. From 1986 to 1989, Mateo & Matos performed at many club festivals and old school block parties in the tri-state area of New York. By 1989, they were working on their own productions. After several releases on their own Final Cut Records label, they went on to record for Oxygen Music Works, Henry Street, Nervous Records, Nite Grooves and Spiritual Life Music in the mid-1990s. Their debut album as producers, New York Rhythms, appeared on the Scottish Glasgow Underground Recordings label in 1997, with a second volume appearing the following year. In 1999, these were followed by The Many Shades of Mateo & Matos.

They have since made deejay appearances in over 30 countries and released dozens of original productions and remixes on record labels such as Manuscript Records Ukraine, King Street Records, Defected Records, and Large Music.

== Discography ==
- 1994 - Raw elements - Black label Recordings
- 1996 - Essential elements - Nite Grooves
- 1997 - New York rhythms - Glasgow Underground Recordings
- 1997 - Deeper dimensions EP (part 2) - Nite grooves
- 1997 - Songs For The Soul EP - Large Music
- 1998 - Mixed moods EP - Spiritual Life Music
- 1998 - New York rhythms Remix EP - Glasgow Underground Recordings
- 1998 - New York rhythms Volume two - Glasgow Underground Recordings
- 1998 - Images EP - 4th Floor Records
- 1999 - Frontiers EP - Large Music
- 1999 - The Many Shades of Mateo & Matos - Glasgow Underground Recordings
- 2001 - Inspirations - Glasgow Underground
- 2002 - After midnite EP - Large Music
- 2003 - Enter Our World - Glasgow Underground
- 2004 - Essential elements - Nite Grooves
- 2006 - Soul spirit EP - West End Records
- 2010 - Want u tonight - Manuscript Records Ukraine
- 2012 - "House Legends: Mateo & Matos" - King Street Sounds (#KSD204)

== Remixes ==
- 1995 - Lift him up - King Street Sounds
- 1995 - Sex on my mind - King Street Sounds
- 1997 - Get up (remixes) - Nervous Records
- 1998 - Beng Beng Beng - Sound of Barclay
- 2000 - Tribute Final - Statra Recordings
- 2001 - Faith - D:Vision records
- 2005 - Joey Negro in the house - ITH Records
- 2006 - For the love of house - ITH Records
