= Romanthony =

American DJ (1967–2013)

Background information
- Also known as: Apostle 1; Buzzin Cuzzins; C.O.B.; Lifestyles; Mychaelangelo; Phatt Pussycat; Romanthony's Nightvision; The Trojan Horse
- Born: Anthony Wayne Moore; September 5, 1967; New Jersey, US
- Died: May 7, 2013 (aged 45) Austin, Texas, US
- Genres: Garage house; deep house
- Occupations: Disc jockey; record producer; singer; songwriter
- Years active: 1991–2013
- Labels: Black Male; Roulé; Dim Mak; Azuli; Play It Again Sam; Compuphonic; Glasgow Undergrownd

Anthony Wayne Moore (September 5, 1967 – May 7, 2013), known professionally as Romanthony, was an American DJ, record producer, and singer.

== Early life, family and education ==
Anthony Wayne Moore was born on September 5, 1967, in New Jersey, where he was raised. He had a sister, Mellony Moore. His parents saw his musical aptitude when he was young and he was encouraged to take music lessons and learn the guitar.

Despite being a house and techno artist, many of his influences came from older acts such as Chuck Berry, Elvis Presley, the Beatles, Marvin Gaye, and Led Zeppelin. He chose the name Romanthony to avoid confusion with the British musician Anthony Moore, a founding member of Slapp Happy.

== Career ==
His work was predominantly released on house music labels and was appreciated within that scene but crossed several genres, including gospel, blues, R&B, disco, p-funk and hip hop, and was praised for its experimental and individualistic production. In his interviews, Romanthony said that gospel and funk strongly influenced his singing style and his song production. Early single "Falling From Grace" was compared in contemporary reviews and later reporting to Prince. Tracks like "Hold On" make extensive use of sampling with a soulful house feel, while the later "Bring U Up" uses a James Brown–style breakbeat. His 1999 album Instinctual was a collaboration with New York producer Mary Mac aka DJ Predator, who he had met when she was DJing in Manhattan's Buddha Bar. Though often media-shy, and considered an eccentric and uncategorisable presence he received immense critical praise, and was included in Daft Punk's "Teachers" list song on their 1997 Homework album alongside the biggest legends of house and techno.

Daft Punk had talked of wanting to collaborate with Romanthony since at least 1995. He worked on their 2001 album Discovery on the songs "One More Time" and "Too Long". Legal problems for Daft Punk around an alleged sample of Eddie Johns on "One More Time" caused Moore's royalty stream from it to dry up, and he struggled to land a new solo deal. On November 7, 2012, he released his final musical contribution in the song "2Nite4U" with Kris Menace on his vocal collaboration album, Features.

Romanthony appeared on Black Male Records (his own label), Roulé, Dim Mak Records, Azuli, Play It Again Sam (PIAS), Compuphonic, and Glasgow Underground Recordings.

== Personal life and death ==
Moore resided in Austin, Texas. He died at his home on May 7, 2013, aged 45, (Note: Also reported erroneously as 46.) due to complications from kidney disease, according to family members. He had been working on a track with German electro-house producer Boys Noize at the time of his death.

== Discography ==
=== Albums ===
- Romanworld (1997)
- Instinctual (1999)
- Live in the Mix (1999)
- R.Hide in Plain Site (2000)

=== Singles ===
- "Now You Want Me" (Black Male Records 1991)
- "Falling from Grace" (Azuli Records 1993)
- "Make This Love Right / Now You Want Me" (Azuli Records 1993)
- "Testify #1" (Romanthony w/ The Trojan Horse) (Black Male Records 1993)
- "The Wanderer" (Black Male Records 1993)
- "Da' Change / Hold On" (Romanthony w/ The Trojan Horse) (Black Male Records 1994)
- "In the Mix (A Tribute to Tony Humphries)" (Azuli Records 1994)
- "Let Me Show You Love" (Azuli Records 1994)
- "Ministry of Love" (Azuli Records 1994)
- "The Wanderer" (Prescription 1994)
- "Bring U Up" (Romanthony w/ The Trojan Horse) (Black Male Records 1995)
- "The House of God" (Black Male Records 1995)
- "Trust" (Romanthony presents Lifestyles) (Downtown 161 1995)
- "Hold On" (Roulé 1999)
- "One More Time" (vocals for Daft Punk) (2000)
- "Too Long" (vocals for Daft Punk) (2001)
- "Never Fuck" (2002)
- "Collins Ave. / Samedream" (DigiTalent Records 2004)
- "All Nite Dancin'" (Club Clique) (DigiTalent Records 2004)
- "When Your Around" (DigiTalent Records 2005)
- "Curious" (2008)
- "Remember 2 4Get" (2009)
- "B 2 Nite" (2010)
- "Let's Go Back" by Kraak & Smaak featuring Romanthony (Solomun Remix) (2011)
- "Steppin' Out" by Tom Trago featuring Romanthony (2011)
- "Do It" (Teengirl Fantasy feat. Romanthony) (2012)
- "The Wanderer" (Romanthony vs. Kevin McKay) (2013)
- "2Nite4U" (Romanthony and Kris Menace) (2013)
