= Glasgow Underground Recordings =

Scottish house music record label

- Founded: 1997
- Founder: Kevin McKay
- Genre: House; Deep house
- Country of origin: Scotland, UK
- Location: London
- Official website: http://www.glasgowunderground.com/

Glasgow Underground Recordings is a house music record label owned by Scottish electronic musician Kevin McKay.

The label was created in 1997 and has been home to artists such as Romanthony, DJ Q, Mateo & Matos, Pascal Rioux, Rose Smith, Muzique Tropique, Milton Jackson and DJ Mash. In 2006, McKay set up Prestel Records, which released a number of 12" records, notably by Das Pop, Cobra Dukes and Dada Life.

In 2011 he resurrected the label to release a number of compilations and singles.

== See also ==
- Lists of record labels
